= PZL P.6 =

Polish single-seat gull-wing monoplane fighter

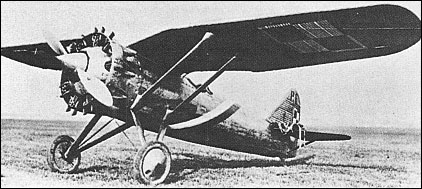
- PZL P.6

General information
- Type: Fighter
- Manufacturer: PZL
- Designer: Zygmunt Puławski
- Status: Prototype
- Primary user: Polish Air Force
- Number built: 1

History
- First flight: August 1930
- Developed from: PZL P.1
- Variant: PZL P.7

The PZL P.6 was a pre-WW2 Polish single-seat gull-wing monoplane fighter, designed by Zygmunt Puławski, and manufactured by the Państwowe Zakłady Lotnicze (PZL) state-owned factory. It remained a prototype and did not go into production.

== Design and development ==
Zygmunt Puławski designed the all-metal metal-covered monoplane PZL P.1 fighter in 1928 which was powered with an inline engine, and developed a speed of 302 km/h (188 mph), but remained a prototype, because the Polish Air Force decided that its fighters should be powered with a Polish-built radial engine. The next model PZL P.6, was powered with a Bristol Jupiter VI FH radial engine.

The PZL P.6 flew for the first time in August 1930 with test pilot Bolesław Orliński at the controls. It had a very similar wing to the P.1, but the semi-monocoque fuselage was completely redesigned with an circular cross-section, and the tail was altered. The modifications reduced the aircraft's empty weight by over 200 kg (440 lb).

== Technical description ==
The PZL P.6 was an all-metal duralumin-covered, strut-braced, gull-wing monoplane. The forward fuselage was built around a tubular steel frame, while the rear fuselage was a circular semi-monocoque. The tapered two-spar wing which was thinner and narrower at the root was skinned with a ribbed and corrugated Wibault type duralumin sheet, and braced by a pair struts on either side. The open cockpit was provided with a windscreen but no headrest. The Bristol Jupiter VI FH radial engine mounted in front was fitted with a Townend ring to reduce drag and used a fixed pitch two-bladed metal propeller. Puławski abandoned the single strut internally sprung legs of the P.1, and used a pair of vees, each braced to the centerline. The fixed undercarriage with a rear skid was conventional and typical of the period. The fuselage had a fuel tank that could be jettisoned in case of an emergency.

== Testing and evaluation ==
The wing design was referred to as the "Polish wing" or "Puławski wing" although it was preceded by the Nieuport Madon and Curtiss XP-10, which used the same configuration. During a presentation at the Paris Air Show in Le Bourget in December 1931, the aviation press, such as L'Air, The Aeroplane, Flight and Die Luftwacht acknowledged the P.6 as one of the world's top fighter designs. Significantly, the P.6 prototype, piloted by Bolesław Orliński, won the American National Air Races held in Cleveland between the 29th of August and the 7th of September 1931.

The PZL P.6 did not enter production, because at the same time the next improved variant, the PZL P.7 was being developed. The first P.7 prototype retained most design traits of the P.6 with a more powerful supercharged Bristol Jupiter VII F engine, and achieved better performance at higher altitudes.

The single P.6 prototype crashed on 11 October 1931 near Częstochowa due to the propeller breaking apart, resulting in catastrophic engine failure. The pilot bailed out successfully.

== Variants ==
- P.6/I : Prototype, which also served as the prototype for the P.7.

== Operators ==
Poland

- Polish Air Force

== Specifications (P.6/I) ==
Data from Polish aircraft 1893-1939

General characteristics

- Crew: 1
- Length: 7.16 m (23 ft 6 in)
- Wingspan: 10.3 m (33 ft 10 in)
- Height: 2.75 m (9 ft 0 in)
- Wing area: 17.2 m^{2} (185 sq ft)
- Airfoil: root:IAW-72 (Bartel 37/IIa) (6.5%); tip: IAW-72 (Bartel 37/IIa) (8%)
- Empty weight: 908 kg (2,002 lb)
- Gross weight: 1,355 kg (2,987 lb)
- Fuel capacity: 250 L (66 US gal; 55 imp gal) in a jettisonable fuselage tank
- Powerplant: 1 × Bristol Jupiter VIFH 9-cylinder air-cooled radial piston engine, 340 kW (450 hp)
- Propellers: 2-bladed Gnome-Rhŏne fixed-pitch metal propeller

Performance

- Maximum speed: 292 km/h (181 mph, 158 kn) at sea level

285 km/h (177 mph; 154 kn) at 3,800 m (12,500 ft)

- Minimum speed: 100 km/h (62 mph; 54 kn)
- Stall speed: 103 km/h (64 mph, 56 kn)
- Range: 600 km (370 mi, 320 nmi)
- Service ceiling: 8,600 m (28,200 ft)
- Rate of climb: 10.3 m/s (2,030 ft/min)
- Time to altitude: 2,000 m (6,600 ft) in 2 minutes 50 seconds

5,000 m (16,000 ft) in 9 minutes 1 seconds

- Wing loading: 78.7 kg/m^{2} (16.1 lb/sq ft)
- Power/mass: 0.25 kW/kg (0.15 hp/lb)

Armament

- Guns: 2 x 7.7 mm (0.303 in) Vickers E machine guns in the fuselage

== See also ==
Related development

- PZL P.1
- PZL P.7
- PZL P.8
- PZL P.11
- PZL P.24

Aircraft of comparable role, configuration, and era

- Dewoitine D.371
- Loire 46
- Ikarus IK-2
- Polikarpov I-15
