= PZL P.7 =

Polish fighter aircraft

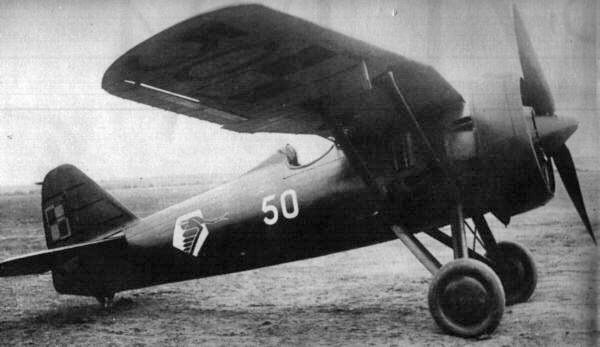
- PZL P.7

General information
- Type: Fighter
- Manufacturer: PZL
- Status: retired
- Primary user: Poland
- Number built: 149+2

History
- Manufactured: 1932–1933
- Introduction date: 1933
- First flight: October 1930
- Developed from: PZL P.6

The PZL P.7 was a Polish gull wing monoplane fighter aircraft designed in the early 1930s at the PZL factory in Warsaw. It was the main fighter of the Polish Air Force between 1933 and 1935. The PZL P.7 was replaced in Polish service by its follow-up design, the PZL P.11c. More than 30 PZL P.7 fighters remained in service during the Invasion of Poland, scoring several kills despite its obsolescence.

== Design and development ==
The history of the PZL P.7 began in 1928, when a talented designer named Zygmunt Puławski designed an all-metal, metal-covered monoplane fighter, the PZL P.1. It introduced a high gull wing whose design was called the "Polish wing" or "Pulawski wing." The P.1 was powered by an inline engine and developed a speed of 302 km/h (188 mph). But it remained a prototype because a decision was made to use a licence-produced radial engine in the Polish Air Force fighters. So the next model, the PZL P.6, flown in August 1930, was powered by the Bristol Jupiter VI FH radial engine. Both aircraft were well received and it won the American National Air Races in August–September 1931.

The PZL P.6 did not enter production because a more advanced variant, the PZL P.7, was in development. The first prototype was basically a P.6 with a more powerful Bristol Jupiter VII.F engine. The addition of a supercharger improved performance at higher altitudes. The prototype P.7/I was first flown in October 1930 by Bolesław Orliński. Initially, engine cylinders had individual cylinder fairings. After numerous changes, most noticeably the addition of a wide Townend ring to the engine, and a higher aspect tail, the second prototype P.7/II which had been completed in autumn 1931, was accepted for production with the designation P.7a. The wing was redesigned with slightly increased span, taken from the PZL P.8, and shorter ailerons were used, and structural changes eliminated external ribs from the wing upper surfaces. P.7a production began in mid-1932 and the last of the 149 (plus two prototypes) were completed in 1933. The Polish Air Force received the P.7a in 1933.

Puławski continued to develop the basic design by adding more powerful engines, which resulted in the PZL P.11. Puławski preferred inline engines and also designed the slimmer P.8 and the related P.9 with inline engines but he died in an air accident in March 1931, and these were cancelled. The P.11 became the standard Polish fighter while the PZL P.24 was developed in parallel as an export variant in 1932.

=== Technical features ===
The all-metal, duralumin metal-covered strut braced gull-wing monoplane was conventional in layout, and used a conventional fixed undercarriage with a tail skid. The two-spar trapezoid wing was thinner by the fuselage and was covered with a ribbed Wibault type duralumin sheet (although the upper surfaces were smooth) and braced by two struts on each side. The fuselage was framed in a front section and semi-monocoque in mid- and tail sections, oval in cross-section. In keeping with the period, the pilot's cockpit was open with a windshield. Armament was two 7.92 mm (0.312 in) machine guns mounted on the fuselage sides which replaced the initially fitted 7.7 mm (0.303 in) Vickers E which were re-bored. The aircraft was powered by a 360 to 390 kW (480 to 520 hp) Bristol Jupiter VII F radial engine fitted with a Townend ring and two-blade propeller. A main 290 L (64 imp gal; 77 US gal) fuel tank in the fuselage, behind the engine could be dropped in case of a fire emergency. The second fuel tank was 7 L (1.5 imp gal; 1.8 US gal).

== Operational history ==
The PZL P.7a entered service in spring 1933, replacing PWS-A (a licence-built Avia BH-33) and PWS-10 fighters. Consequently, the Polish Air Force became the first air force entirely equipped with all-metal monococque fighters. When the P.7 entered service, it was comparable to contemporary designs, but due to rapid progress, it was obsolete by 1939. From 1935, the PZL P.11 replaced the P.7 in most combat units, but was only a slight improvement, while the P.7as were relegated to air schools.

At the outbreak of World War II on 1 September 1939, the Polish Air Force still had 30 PZL P.7a fighters in combat units. A further 40 were with flying schools, and 35 were in reserve or undergoing repairs for a total of 106 aircraft. The P.7as were used by three squadrons, each equipped with 10 aircraft. The Pursuit Brigade's 123rd Squadron was deployed near Warsaw, while the 151st and the 162nd Squadrons were attached to Army units. Despite being obsolete, they engaged the German attackers during the invasion of Poland. In addition to combat units, at least 18 P.7a fighters were used by improvised units from air bases in Dęblin and Ułęż.

Although the P.7 was more manoeuvrable than their opponents and could operate from short or rough fields, almost all the German aircraft were faster, and worse, the Polish aircraft and their engines were worn out from intensive service use. Their two machine guns was also inadequate and jammed frequently while only some replaced the vintage Vickers with the better PWU FK wz.33. Pilots flying the P.7a claimed to have shot down seven German aircraft (two Heinkel He 111s, two Dornier Do 17s, one Henschel Hs 126 and two Messerschmitt Bf 110s), against 22 losses.

Most were destroyed in 1939, in combat or on the ground, but around a dozen were withdrawn to Romania, but were not used in combat there. Some captured P.7s were used by the Germans for training. Several aircraft were captured by the Soviets and were also assigned to training units.

== Variants ==
P.6
precursor design prototypes with lower rated engine; two built.
P.7/I
First prototype.
P.7/II
Second prototype equipped with Townend ring.
P.7a
Serial-built version.

== Operators ==
Germany

- Luftwaffe operated few captured aircraft for training.

Poland

- Polish Air Force

Romania

- Royal Romanian Air Force operated few interned aircraft for training.

Soviet Union

- Soviet Air Force operated few captured aircraft for training.

== Specifications (PZL P.7a) ==
Data from Polish Aircraft 1893–1939

General characteristics

- Crew: One
- Length: 7.16 m (23 ft 6 in)
- Wingspan: 10.3 m (33 ft 10 in)
- Height: 2.75 m (9 ft 0 in)
- Wing area: 17.2 m^{2} (185 sq ft)
- Airfoil: root: IAW-72 (Bartel 37/IIa) (6.5%); tip: IAW-72 (Bartel 37/IIa (8%))
- Empty weight: 1,010 kg (2,227 lb)
- Gross weight: 1,409 kg (3,106 lb)
- Fuel capacity: 250 L (55 imp gal; 66 US gal) in a jettisonable fuselage tank
- Powerplant: 1 × Polish Skoda Works Jupiter VIIF 9-cylinder air-cooled radial piston engine, 393 kW (527 hp) for take-off

362 kW (485 hp) normal rating

- Propellers: 2-bladed Szomański fixed-pitch wooden propeller

Performance

- Maximum speed: 317 km/h (197 mph, 171 kn) at 4,000 m (13,000 ft)

308 km/h (191 mph) at 2,000 m (6,600 ft)
276 km/h (171 mph) at sea level

- Stall speed: 102 km/h (63 mph, 55 kn)
- Range: 560 km (350 mi, 300 nmi)
- Service ceiling: 8,275 m (27,149 ft)
- Time to altitude: 1,000 m (3,300 ft) in 1 minute 38 seconds

3,000 m (9,800 ft) in 5 minute 3 seconds

- Wing loading: 81.8 kg/m^{2} (16.8 lb/sq ft)
- Power/mass: 0.2652 kW/kg (0.1613 hp/lb)

Armament

- Guns: 2 x 7.9 mm (0.31 in) Vickers Model E machine guns (later series: Karabin maszynowy wz. 33 machine guns)

== See also ==
Related development

- PZL P.1
- PZL P.6
- PZL P.8
- PZL P.11
- PZL P.24

Aircraft of comparable role, configuration, and era

- Dewoitine D.371
- Loire 46
- Ikarus IK-2
