= Czesław Główczyński =

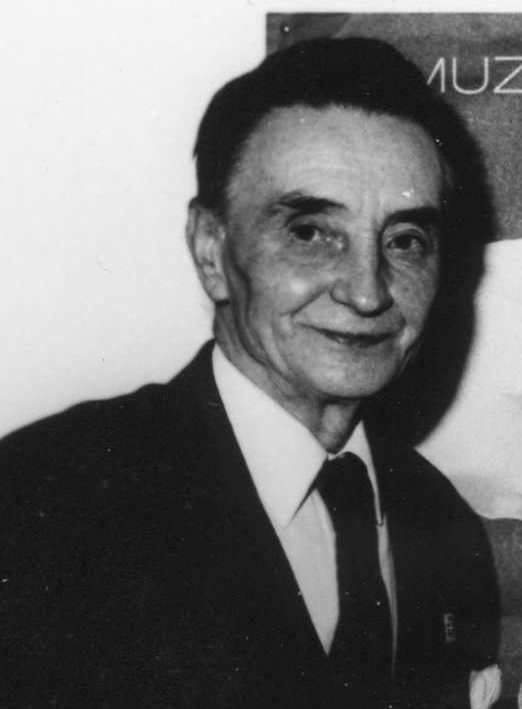
- Born: 22 July 1913; Będzin, Congress Poland
- Died: 17 December 2000 (aged 87); Warsaw, Poland
- Military career
- Allegiance: Poland; France; United Kingdom; United States of America
- Branch: Polish Air Force; France Armée de l'Air; Royal Air Force; United States Air Force
- Rank: flight lieutenant
- Service number: P-1495
- Units: Polish 162nd Fighter Escadrille; I/145 Polish Fighter Squadron; No. 302 Polish Fighter Squadron
- Conflicts: World War II
- Awards: Virtuti Militari; Cross of Valour; Croix de Guerre

Czesław Marian Główczyński (22 July 1913 – 17 December 2000) was a Polish fighter ace of the Polish Air Force in World War II with 5 confirmed kills and one shared.

== Biography ==
Czesław Główczyński was born in 1913. In 1935 he obtained his glider pilot license and began to study at the Volyn Cadet School for Artillery Reserve Officers (Wołyńska Szkoła Podchorążych Rezerwy Artylerii) in Włodzimierz Wołynski. One year later he entered the Polish Air Force Academy in Dęblin. In late October 1938 he was named second lieutenant (podporucznik) and assigned to the Polish 162nd Fighter Escadrille where he flew PZL P.7.

On the first day of World War II Głowczyński damaged a Hs 126. The next day he shot down a He 111 and a Bf 110 (shared with another pilot). On 3 September he scored a Ju 86 and three days later another He 111. During the September campaign he flew a PZL P.11. On 17 September Główczyński crossed on his plane the border with Romania.

He was interned in Drăgășani and in Turnu Sevarin. On 1 November he escaped and crossed the border with Yugoslavia then he arrived in Greece. On 28 November he sailed from Athens in the SS Pułaski to Marseille.

In France, Główczyński was posted to the I/145 Polish Fighter Squadron where he flew a Caudron C.714. On 9 June 1940 near Paris he shot down a Bf 109 and another one probably. The same day he probably destroyed a Do 17. On 19 June Główczyński was evacuated to the United Kingdom.

In the RAF, he was ordered to the No. 302 Polish Fighter Squadron. On 17 August 1940, during a training flight his Hurricane caught fire for unknown reasons. Główczyński managed to land and run away from the aircraft before it exploded. Wounded in the accident, he spent three months in hospital. He returned to his unit in April 1941. He scored his last victory on 30 December 1941.

On 25 January 1942, Główczyński was sent to the Polish General Staff where he served as Air adjutant to the general Władysław Sikorski. After Sikorski's death, he became the adjudant to the general Kazimierz Sosnkowski. In March 1944 he took a half-year study at Aviation School in Weston-super-Mare, then he served in the USAAF where he flew Republic P-47 Thunderbolt.

He was a co-founder of the Polish Air Force Association.

Czesław Główczyński died on 17 December 2000 in Warsaw. He is buried at the Powązki Cemetery.

== Aerial victory credits ==
- Hs 126 - 1 September 1939 (damaged)
- He 111 - 2 September 1939
- 1/2 Bf 110 - 2 September 1939
- Ju 86 - 3 September 1939
- He 111 - 6 September 1939
- Bf 109 - 9 June 1940
- Bf 109 - 9 June 1940 (probably damaged)
- Do 17 - 9 June 1940 (probably damaged)
- Bf 109 - 30 December 1941

== Awards ==
Virtuti Militari, Silver Cross
Cross of Valour (Poland), four times
Croix de Guerre
