= Bolesław Orliński =

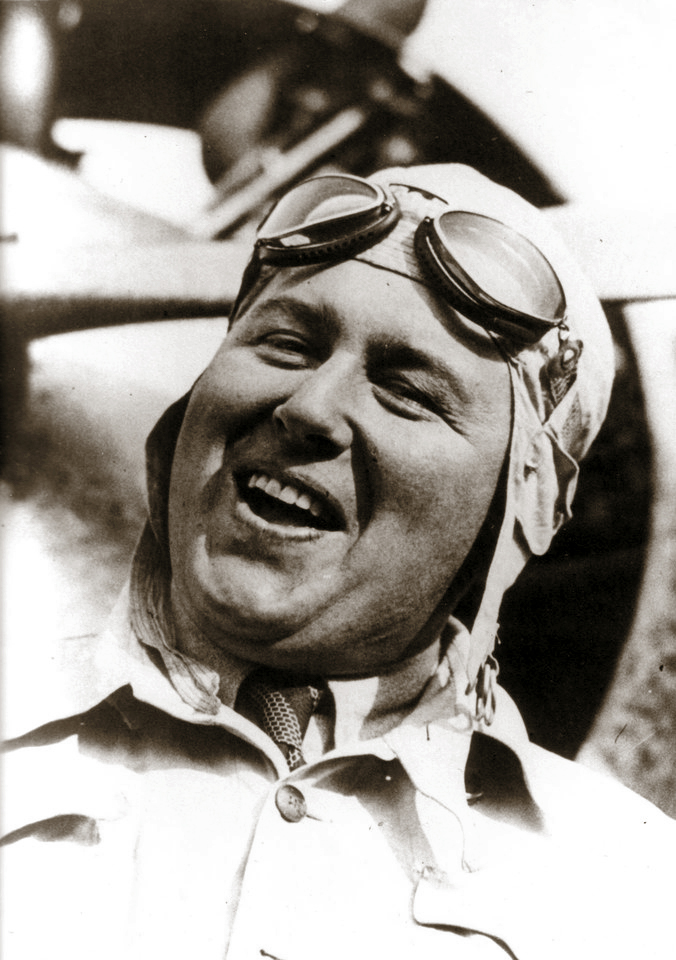
- Orliński in 1934
- Born: 13 April 1899; Niwerka, Podolian Governorate, Russian Empire (modern-day Khmelnytskyi Oblast, Ukraine)
- Died: 28 February 1992 (aged 92) Mississauga, Ontario, Canada
- Allegiance: Poland
- Branch: Polish Legions: Polish I Corps in Russia; Polish Air Force Royal Air Force
- Service years: 1917-1928; 1939-1945
- Rank: Wing commander (RAF)
- Commands: No. 305 Squadron RAF
- Conflicts: World War I; Eastern Front; Polish–Soviet War; World War II; Invasion of Poland
- Awards: Virtuti Militari (5th class); Cross of Valour; Cross of Merit

Bolesław Orliński (13 April 1899 – 28 February 1992) was a Polish aviator, military, sports and test pilot.

== Biography ==
He was born on the family estate in Niwerka, Podolia (now Niverka, Kamianets-Podilskyi Raion, Khmelnytskyi Oblast, Ukraine). During World War I he was commissioned in the Russian Army, and fought in an infantry regiment on the German front, becoming an NCO. In 1918 he joined the newly formed Polish 1st Corps of Gen. Józef Dowbór-Muśnicki. When the corps was disarmed by the Germans in May 1918 he went to Ukraine and briefly served in the army of the Ukrainian People's Republic. He returned to Poland after independence and joined the Polish Army. He served in the cavalry during the Polish-Soviet war, and then volunteered for the air force.

He completed pilot training in Bydgoszcz and Grudziądz and in 1923 became an instructor in Grudziądz.

From 27 August to 25 September 1926, with mechanic Leon Kubiak, Orliński flew from Warsaw to Tokyo (10,300 km (6,400 mi)) and back in a Breguet 19 A2. On the way back the plane was damaged by wind in Byrka and its left lower wing was broken and propeller was cracked. The Polish aviators shortened the opposite wing and repaired the propeller with glue and wire, and thus repaired flew the 6,680 kilometres (4,150 mi) to Warsaw. For the feat, Orliński was awarded the Japanese Order of the Rising Sun, 6th Class, and the French Legion of Honor and was promoted to captain.

In 1928 he left the service and became a test pilot with the Polish PZL aviation works in Warsaw. He test flew all PZL fighter prototypes, from the PZL P.1 designed by Zygmunt Puławski in 1928, through the PZL P.6, PZL P.7, PZL P.8, PZL P.11, PZL P.24 to PZL P.50 Jastrząb in 1939. He also tested the sports planes PZL.19 and PZL.26, passenger planes PZL.4 and PZL.44 Wicher, and liaison plane PZL Ł.2.

Apart from his test pilot work, he took part in numerous aviation contests and presentations of Polish aircraft abroad. Flying the PZL.5 he participated in the Challenge 1930 international touring planes contest, but failed to finish due to engine failure on 26 July. In December 1930 he presented the fighter PZL P.6 at the Paris Air Show. Flying the P.6, Orliński won the National Air Races in Cleveland from 29 August – 7 September 1931. Flying the PZL.19 he took part in the Challenge 1932 contest, but had to withdraw due to illness. On 28 June 1934 he set a world speed record for radial engined fighters of 414 kilometres per hour (257 mph), flying the PZL P.24. During this time, he survived several crashes and emergency parachute jumps. In January 1936 he carried out a promotional tour in the Balkans.

After the outbreak of World War II and the German invasion on Poland, he volunteered for the Polish Army. On 8 September 1939, he was sent to Romania in preparation to receive British-built fighters. He subsequently reached Great Britain via Yugoslavia, Italy and France, where the remnants of the Polish Air Force were serving. Because of his age he could not be a fighter pilot and became an instructor. In 1943 he joined No. 305 Polish Bomber Squadron, flying the de Havilland Mosquito fighter-bomber. From 1 August 1944 to 31 January 1945, Wing Commander Orliński was the commander of No. 305 Squadron. He flew 49 operational sorties, mostly at night. From 1 February 1945 until the end of the war in Europe, he was kept out of combat.

After the war, he decided not to return to Poland and settled in Toronto, Canada. During his career he flew 92 aircraft types and spent some 7,000 hours in the air. He died in Mississauga at the age of 92 and was buried in Poland.

== Honours and awards ==
- Cross of Valour
- Gold Cross of Merit, twice
- Legion of Honour, Chevalier (France)
- Order of the Rising Sun, Jun class (Japan)
- Order of the Crown of Romania, Officer
- Silver Cross of the Virtuti Militari
- Air Force Medal 1939-45 (Medal Lotniczy) – four times
- Distinguished Flying Cross (United Kingdom)
