= Frank Neubert =

- Born: 28 September 1915; Bad Herrenalb, Germany
- Died: 13 December 2003 (aged 88); Gütersloh, Germany
- Military career
- Allegiance: Nazi Germany (to 1945); West Germany
- Branch: Luftwaffe; German Air Force
- Service years: 1936 – 1945; 1958 – 1972
- Rank: Major (Wehrmacht); Oberstleutnant (Bundeswehr)
- Units: Sturzkampfgeschwader 2 Schlachtgeschwader 1 Schlachtgeschwader 101
- Commands: II./SG 1 II./StG 1 II./101
- Conflicts: World War II: Invasion of Poland; Battle of France; Battle of Britain; Invasion of Yugoslavia; Battle of Crete; Operation Barbarossa
- Awards: Knight's Cross of the Iron Cross

Frank Neubert (28 September 1915 – 13 December 2003) was a highly decorated Major in the Luftwaffe during World War II, and a recipient of the Knight's Cross of the Iron Cross. He is believed to have been the first victor in aerial combat in World War II after shooting down Captain Mieczyslaw Medwecki's PZL P.11 in the early hours of 1 September 1939. The Knight's Cross of the Iron Cross, and its variants were the highest awards in the military and paramilitary forces of Nazi Germany during World War II. During his career he was credited with participating in 350+ missions.

== Awards and decorations ==
- Flugzeugführerabzeichen
- Front Flying Clasp of the Luftwaffe in Gold
- Ehrenpokal der Luftwaffe (14 October 1942)
- Iron Cross (1939)
  - 2nd Class
  - 1st Class
- Wound Badge (1939)
  - in Black or Silver
- German Cross in Gold 5 February 1942 as Oberleutnant in the I./Sturzkampfgeschwader 2
- Knight's Cross of the Iron Cross on 22 June 1941 as Oberleutnant and Staffelkapitän of the 2./Sturzkampfgeschwader 2 "Immelmann" (Note: According to Scherzer on 24 June 1941.)

== Notes ==
Military offices
| Preceded by Hauptmann Paul-Friedrich Darjes | Gruppenkommandeur of II./SchlG 1 March 1942 – September 1942 | Succeeded by Hauptmann Heinz Frank |
| Preceded by Major Alfred Druschel | Gruppenkommandeur of II./StG 1; 9 December 1942 – August 1943 | Succeeded by Hauptmann Ernst Ott |
| Preceded by Major Hermann Langemann | Gruppenkommandeur of II./SG 101; 11 October 1943 - 22 February 1945 | Succeeded by Unknown |
