= Zygmunt Puławski =

Polish aircraft designer and pilot

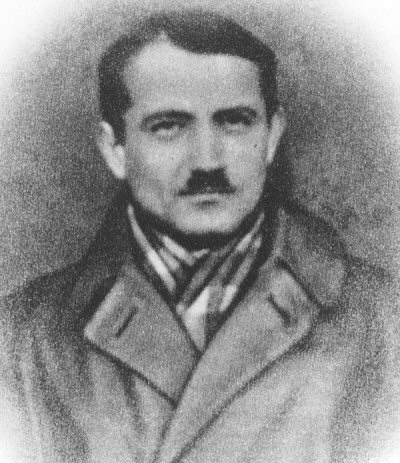
- Born: October 24, 1901; Lublin, Russian Poland, Russian Empire
- Died: March 21, 1931 (aged 29); Warsaw, Second Polish Republic
- Cause of death: Plane crash

Zygmunt Puławski (October 24, 1901 – March 21, 1931) was a Polish aircraft designer and pilot. He invented a gull-wing aircraft design, also known as "Puławski wing" and designed a series of Polish PZL fighter aircraft.

== Life and career ==
Puławski was born in Lublin. He graduated from business school in 1920. In the summer of 1920, during the Soviet offensive in the Polish–Soviet War, he volunteered for a Boy Scout battalion. In late 1920, he commenced studies at the Warsaw University of Technology. He was a member of the Aviation Section of the Students' Mechanical Club, where he constructed some gliders. He distinguished himself as a thorough and able student. In 1925, he graduated from the university, receiving the engineer title, and left to practice in the Breguet Aviation works in France. After his return, he began his required national service, completing military aviation school in Bydgoszcz and becoming a pilot. From 1927, he became the chief general designer of the Central Aviation Workshops (CWL) at Słupecka Street in Warsaw, soon reorganized into the PZL (Państwowe Zakłady Lotnicze, "State Aviation Works").

For the Polish military, in 1928 Puławski designed a modern all-metal high-wing fighter with an inline engine, the PZL P.1. For the P.1, he invented a gull-wing design, giving the pilot an excellent view from his cockpit. The P.1 was flown in 1929 and met with great interest. Its wing design became known as the "Puławski wing" or "Polish wing", and was later copied in other designs. The P.1 was not produced; instead, Puławski's next designs, which featured a radial engine, were preferred by the Polish Air Force. A successor of the P.1, the PZL P.6, with a radial engine, first flown in 1930. With pilot Bolesław Orliński, it won at the National Air Races in the United States. It was named the best fighter in the world by at least one military press at that time. Its improved variant, the PZL P.7, was produced for the Polish Air Force (150 were made). In early 1931, Puławski designed another fighter, the PZL P.8, returning to his preferred inline engine. In 1930, he had also been ordered to start refining the P.7 with a stronger engine, which led to the development of a design for the PZL P.11.

Puławski also flew aircraft in the Warsaw Aeroclub. He died on March 21, 1931, in a crash of his newest amphibious flying boat, the PZL.12, in Warsaw, at the age of 29. The plane fell after take-off due to strong wind. After his death, the PZL P.11 project was finished by Wsiewołod Jakimiuk, becoming the main Polish fighter during the 1939 invasion of Poland. Additionally, a faster export model, the PZL P.24, based entirely on Puławski's design, was developed and sold outside of Poland.

Partly due to his death, Puławski's fighters, most modern in the early 1930s, were not replaced with modern successors before 1939, when they were already obsolete.

== Designs ==
Designation	Description	Production
PZL P.1	Fighter prototype, one-engine high wing	1929
PZL P.2	Fighter project, one-engine high wing	Not built
PZL P.6	Fighter prototype, one-engine high wing	1930
PZL P.7	Fighter, one-engine high wing	1930–1932
PZL P.8	Fighter prototype, one-engine high wing	1931
PZL P.9	Fighter project, one-engine high wing	Not built
PZL P.10	Fighter project, one-engine high wing	
PZL P.11	Fighter, one-engine high wing	1931–1934
PZL.12	Amphibious flying boat, one-engine high wing	1931

== See also ==
- Stanisław Wigura
- Jerzy Drzewiecki
- Jerzy Dąbrowski
