= PZL P.1 =

Polish single-seat gull-wing fighter prototype

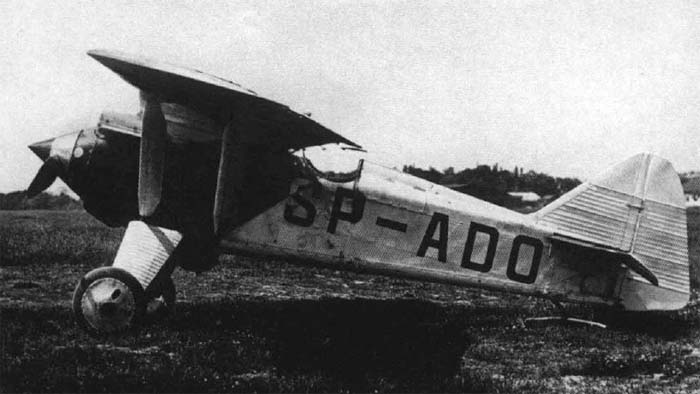
- PZL P.1, second prototype

General information
- Type: Fighter
- Manufacturer: PZL
- Designer: Zygmunt Puławski
- Status: Prototype
- Primary user: Polish Air Force
- Number built: 2

History
- First flight: August 1929
- Developed into: PZL P.6; PZL P.8

The PZL P.1 was a Polish single-seat gull-wing fighter prototype, designed by the engineer Zygmunt Puławski, and manufactured by the PZL state aircraft factory. It remained a prototype, but was the first of the Polish PZL gull wing fighter series, leading to the PZL P.7, P.11 and P.24.

== Design and development ==
Among the first tasks of the newly created PZL aircraft works in 1928 was to design a fighter for the Polish Air Force. A team led by Zygmunt Puławski designed an all-metal monoplane fighter, designated PZL P.1. Puławski included a high gull wing, in an attempt to improve the pilot's visibility upward, compared to typical parasol monoplanes and biplanes of the era.

The first example first flew in August 1929, however the wing leading edge distorted in flight, but the test pilot, with Bolesław Orliński managed to land safely. In late 1929, after additional static tests, the prototype was modified and strengthened. In March 1930, the second prototype was flown, the P.1/II which introduced a revised rudder, similar to those used on later developments, along with numerous other detail changes.

The second prototype took part in a fighter contest in Bucharest in June 1930, where it placed 4th out of 7 competitors, after winning 8 of the 15 trials.

The P.1 remained a prototype, because the Polish Air Force insisted that its fighters be powered with Polish-built radial engines, resulting in the development of the PZL P.6. While this improved reliability and reduced cost, some modern authors have criticized this decision as the single-row radial engine produced more drag, and less power, while it also impaired visibility.

In 1929 or 1930 an improved P.1 was developed, with the designation PZL P.2, but this was abandoned after completing just the fuselage. Puławski was unwilling to abandon inline engines, and developed the P.8 with an inline in 1931.

== Technical description ==
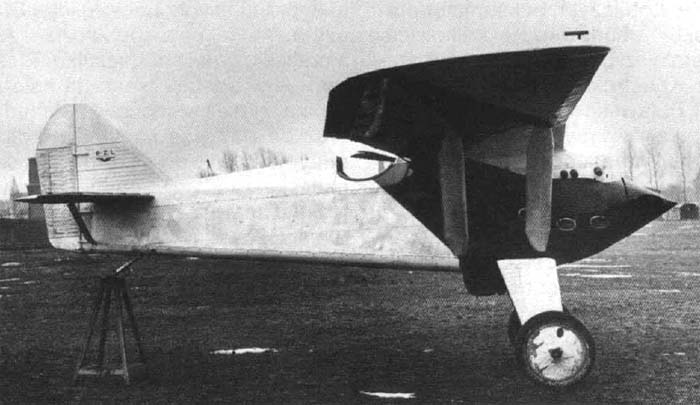
First prototype after modification

The PZL P.1 was an all-metal braced high-wing monoplane with fixed conventional undercarriage. The fuselage was rectangular in cross-section and built around a duralumin frame, skinned in smooth duralumin sheet.

The two-spar tapered wing was thinner and narrower at the roots and covered with corrugated duralumin sheet, braced with a pair of struts on each side. Most of the wing had closely spaced corrugations, while the outer panels had additional larger more widely spaced external ribs. The empennage was conventional, and unbraced and like the wings, was skinned in corrugated duralumin. The tips of all flying surfaces were formed from flat sheet. Two fuel tanks holding 400 L (88 imp gal; 110 US gal) of fuel between then were installed in the wings. The metal control surfaces were unbalanced and skinned with corrugated duralumin.

The open cockpit was fitted with a small windscreen, and faired in with a headrest that extended to the base of the fin. A fixed, but faired undercarriage had shock absorbers that were buried inside the fuselage.

The P.1 was powered with a 630 hp (470 kW) Hispano-Suiza 12Lb water-cooled V-12 engine.

== Operators ==
Poland

- Polish Air Force

== Specifications (P.1/II) ==
Data from Jane's all the World's Aircraft 1931,
Polish aircraft, 1893-1939

General characteristics

- Crew: 1
- Length: 6.98 m (22 ft 11 in)
- Wingspan: 10.85 m (35 ft 7 in)
- Height: 3.05 m (10 ft 0 in) in the rigging position
- Wing area: 19.5 m^{2} (210 sq ft)
- Aspect ratio: 5.97
- Airfoil: Bartel 37/IIa (modified)
- Empty weight: 1,118 kg (2,465 lb)
- Gross weight: 1,580 kg (3,483 lb)
- Fuel capacity: 400 L (110 US gal; 88 imp gal) in two wing tanks with a small gravity collector tank in the fuselage.
- Powerplant: 1 × Hispano-Suiza 12Lb V-12 water-cooled piston engine., 470 kW (630 hp)
- Propellers: 2-bladed fixed-pitch propeller

Performance

- Maximum speed: 302 km/h (188 mph, 163 kn) at sea level

293 km/h (182 mph; 158 kn) at 2,000 m (6,600 ft)
284 km/h (176 mph; 153 kn) at 5,000 m (16,000 ft)

- Cruise speed: 250 km/h (160 mph, 130 kn)
- Stall speed: 102 km/h (63 mph, 55 kn)
- Range: 600 km (370 mi, 320 nmi)
- Endurance: 2 hours at cruising speed.
- Service ceiling: 8,600 m (28,200 ft) absolute
- g limits: 13.5g
- Time to altitude: 2,000 m (6,600 ft) in 2 minutes 40 seconds.

5,000 m (16,000 ft) in 8 minutes

- Wing loading: 81 kg/m^{2} (17 lb/sq ft)
- Power/mass: 0.633 kW/kg (0.385 hp/lb)

Armament

- Guns: 2 x 7.7 mm (0.303 in) Vickers E machine guns in a fuselage, with 800 rounds per gun (planned).

== See also ==
Related development

- PZL P.6
- PZL P.7
- PZL P.8
- PZL P.11
- PZL P.24
