= Loire 46 =

French single-seater fighter aircraft

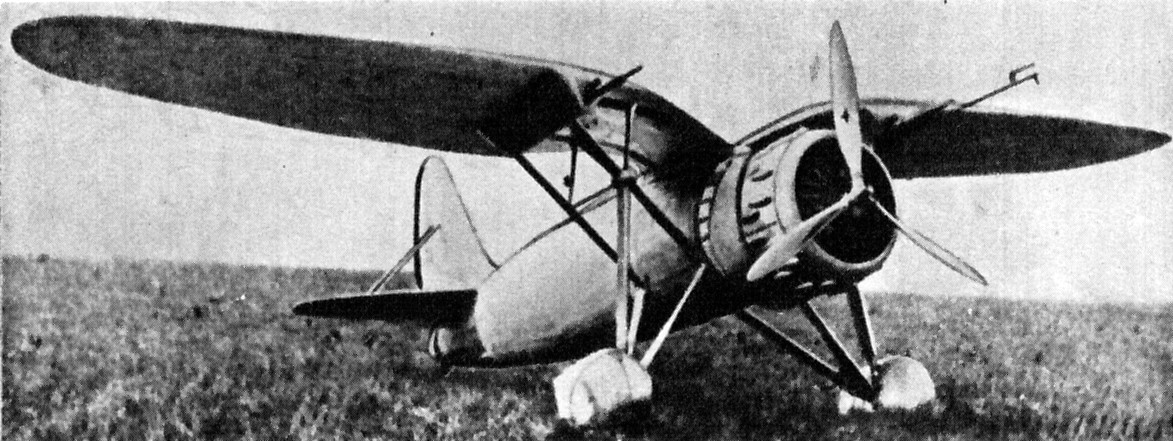

General information
- Type: Trainer/fighter
- Manufacturer: Loire Aviation
- Status: retired
- Primary user: Armee de l'Air
- Number built: 61

History
- Introduction date: 1936
- First flight: 1 September 1934
- Retired: 1940

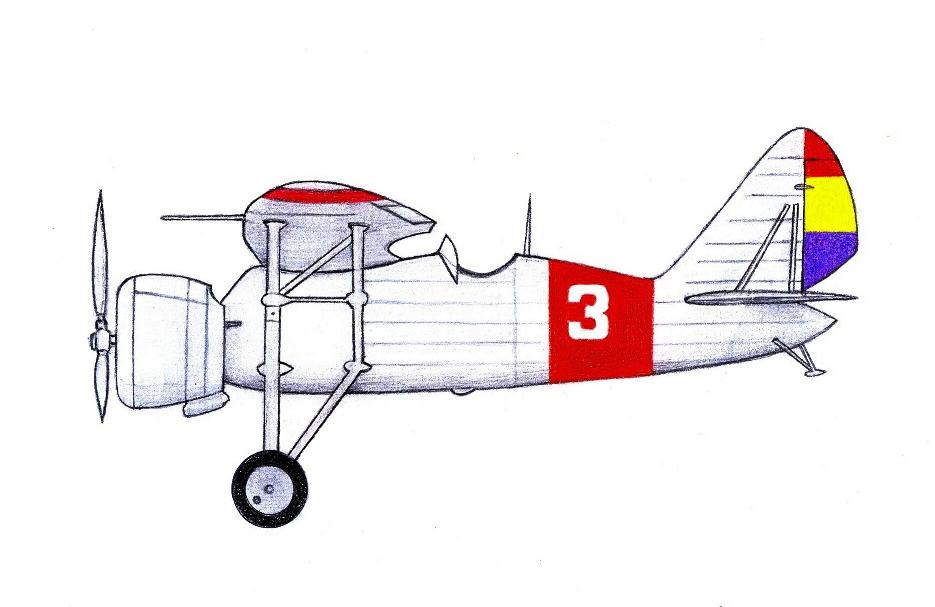
Loire 46 of the Spanish Republican Air Force

The Loire 46 was a French single-seater fighter aircraft of the 1930s. A high-winged monoplane designed and built by Loire Aviation, it was purchased by the French Air Force. It was also supplied to the Spanish Republican forces during the Spanish Civil War, but was almost out of service by the outbreak of World War II.

== Design and development ==
The Loire 46 was an improved modification of two previous Loire fighters—the Loire 43 and 45. Although improved, it resembled the earlier machines retaining their gull mono-wing configuration, open cockpit, and fixed landing gear. The first of five prototype Loire 46s flew in September 1934. It demonstrated excellent handling characteristics and 60 production aircraft were ordered by the Armée de l'Air.

== Operational history ==
Loire 46 side view

The initial machines arrived at fighter Escadrilles in August 1936. In September 1936, the five prototype Loire 46s were sent to the Republican forces during the Spanish Civil War.

By the beginning of World War II, the Loire 46's gull wing configuration was recognized as obsolete and most of these fighters had been relegated to Armée de l'Air training schools, where they were used as advanced trainers. However, one fighter Escadrille was still equipped with the Loire 46 during the early weeks of the war. Their performance against modern German fighters was predictable.

== Variants ==
Loire 46.01
First Loire 46 prototype.
Loire 46
Single-seat fighter/trainer aircraft.

== Operators ==
France

- Armee de l'Air

Spain

- Spanish Republican Air Force

== Specifications (Loire 46) ==
Data from The Complete Book of Fighters

General characteristics

- Crew: 1
- Length: 7.88 m (25 ft 10 in)
- Wingspan: 11.83 m (38 ft 10 in)
- Height: 4.13 m (13 ft 7 in)
- Wing area: 19.5 m^{2} (210 sq ft)
- Empty weight: 1,450 kg (3,197 lb)
- Gross weight: 2,100 kg (4,630 lb)
- Powerplant: 1 × Gnome-Rhône 14Kfs 14-cylinder air-cooled radial piston engine, 694 kW (931 hp)
- Propellers: 3-bladed metal variable-pitch propeller

Performance

- Maximum speed: 370 km/h (230 mph, 200 kn)
- Range: 750 km (470 mi, 400 nmi)
- Service ceiling: 11,750 m (38,550 ft)
- Rate of climb: 12 m/s (2,400 ft/min)
- Time to altitude: 3,000 m (9,800 ft) in 3 minutes 18 seconds

Armament

- Guns: 4 × fixed forward-firing 7.5 mm (0.295 inch) MAC 1934 wing-mounted machine-guns

== See also ==
Comparable and similar aircraft

- PZL P.11/PZL P.24
- Dewoitine D.371/D372
- Gourdou-Leseurre GL.30
- Nieuport-Delage NiD-122
- Curtiss F13C

Related lists

- List of Interwar military aircraft
- List of aircraft of the Spanish Republican Air Force

== Bibliography ==
- "Les chasseurs Loire 40/46" [The Loire 40/46 Fighters]. Le Album de Fanatique de l'Aviation (in French) (27): 2–5. November 1971. ISSN 0757-4169.
- Donald, David, ed. (1997). The encyclopedia of world aircraft (Updated ed.). Leicester, UK: Blitz Editions. ISBN 1-85605-375-X.
- Green, William; Swanborough, Gordon (1994). The Complete Book of Fighters. London: Salamander. ISBN 1-85833-777-1.
- Ledet, Michel (November 1993). "Le Loire 46 (1ère partie)". Avions: Toute l'aéronautique et son histoire (in French) (9): 20–27. ISSN 1243-8650.
- Ledet, Michel (December 1993). "Le Loire 46 (2ème partie)". Avions: Toute l'aéronautique et son histoire (in French) (10): 12–20. ISSN 1243-8650.
- Ledet, Michel (January 1994). "Le Loire 46 (3ème partie)". Avions: Toute l'aéronautique et son histoire (in French) (11): 7–9. ISSN 1243-8650.
- Mombeek, Eric (May 2001). "Les trésors de Cazaux" [The Treasures of Cazaux]. Avions: Toute l'Aéronautique et son histoire (in French) (98): 44–47. ISSN 1243-8650.
- Moulin, Jacques (2004). Loire 43, 45 & 46: les chasseurs Loire-Nieuport. Document'air. Vol. 3. n.p.: Avia Editions. ISBN 978-2-915030-07-5.
- Taylor, John W.R.; Alexander, Jean (1969). Combat aircraft of the world. London: Ebury P.; Michael Joseph. ISBN 0-71810-564-8.
