= PZL P.8 =

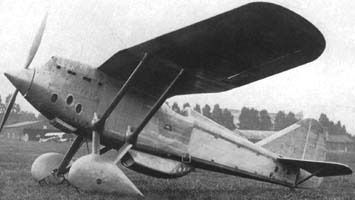
- PZL P.8/I

General information
- Type: Fighter
- Manufacturer: PZL
- Designer: Zygmunt Puławski
- Status: Prototypes only
- Number built: 2

History
- First flight: August 1931
- Developed from: PZL P.1

PZL P.8 was a Polish fighter aircraft designed by Zygmunt Puławski, from the family of fighters with Polish wing (also called the Puławski wing), developed and produced by Państwowe Zakłady Lotnicze (PZL) in the early 1930s.

== Design and development ==
The PZL P.8 was loosely based on the PZL P.1, retaining the slab-sided fuselage and strut braced gull wing characteristic of Puławski's fighters throughout the 1930s. Despite official preference toward radial engines Puławski won authority to develop a new fighter powered by V-12 engines up to 800 hp (600 kW). The two fighter designs which emerged were designated P.8 and P.9, re-using the designations of two seaplane designs that had been rejected by the Polish Navy. Two power-plants were fitted to the two prototypes; the P.8/I was fitted with a 640 hp (480 kW) Hispano-Suiza 12Mc; the P.8/II was fitted with a 760 hp (570 kW) Lorraine 12Hfrs Pétrel Chasse.

The airframe of the PZL P.8 continued Puławski's theme of semi-monocoque stressed skin Aluminium alloy structure with fabric covered control surfaces. The wings were built up around two I-section Aluminium alloy spars with alloy ribs and finely corrugated sheet Duralumin. High set gull style wings were attached to the upper fuselage with about 5 degrees dihedral out to the joint between centre-section and outer wings which had zero dihedral. Support for the wings came from pairs of struts attached to the lower fuselage and at the thickest section of the outer wings at about 1/3span. A fixed tail-wheel undercarriage consisted of strut mounted mainwheels attached to the fuselage at the wing strut attachment points and a steel shod tail-skid. Cooling for the engine was achieved by a large radiator bath under the rear fuselage on the P.8/I and by special surface heat exchangers under the rear fuselage of the PZL P.8/II. The special heat exchangers caused cooling difficulties and were replaced by small radiators either side of the rear fuselage aft of the cockpit.

Flight testing of the first prototype began in 1931, with the second prototype following in 1932, competing in that year's International Air Meeting in Warsaw and the 1932 Salon de l'Aeronautique at Paris. The PZL P.8/I was also due to appear at the 1932 Zurich Meeting, replacing the PZL P.8/II but was damaged beyond repair during a landing at Innsbruck. Beset by cooling problems and with the death of Puławski in 1931, the Department of Aeronautics could not be persuaded to continue with development of V-12 powered fighters, continuing development of the radial engined PZL P.7. Production versions of the PZL P.8 would have been designated P.8 for Hispano-Suiza powered versions, PZL P.9 for Lorraine Pétrel powered versions and PZL P.10 for a proposed 570 hp (430 kW) Rolls-Royce Kestrel powered derivative.

== Variants ==
P.8/I
The first prototype powered by a Hispano-Suiza 12Mc engine.
P.8/II
The second prototype powered by a Lorraine 12Hfrs Pétrel Chasse engine.
P.9
Production version of the P.8/II, powered by a Pétrel engine.
P.10
A proposed version to be powered by a Rolls-Royce Kestrel engine.

== Specifications (PZL P.8/II) ==
Data from Polish Aircraft 1893-1939

General characteristics

- Crew: 1
- Length: 7.56 m (24 ft 10 in)
- Wingspan: 10.5 m (34 ft 5 in)
- Height: 2.75 m (9 ft 0 in)
- Wing area: 18 m^{2} (190 sq ft)
- Empty weight: 1,102 kg (2,429 lb)
- Gross weight: 1,573 kg (3,468 lb)
- Powerplant: 1 × Lorraine 12Hfrs Pétrel Chasse V-12 liquid-cooled piston engine, 570 kW (760 hp) (P.8/II & P.9)
- Powerplant: 1 × Hispano-Suiza 12Mc V-12 liquid-cooled piston engine, 480 kW (640 hp) (P.8/I)
- Powerplant: 1 × Rolls-Royce Kestrel V-12 liquid-cooled piston engine, 430 kW (580 hp) (P.10)
- Propellers: 2-bladed Ratier

Performance

- Maximum speed: 350 km/h (220 mph, 190 kn) at sea level
- Minimum control speed: 105 km/h (65 mph, 57 kn)
- Range: 500 km (310 mi, 270 nmi)
- Service ceiling: 9,100 m (29,900 ft) absolute
- Rate of climb: 11.1 m/s (2,190 ft/min)
- Time to altitude: 5,000m in 7min 30s
- Wing loading: 87 kg/m^{2} (18 lb/sq ft)
- Power/mass: 0.5hp/kg

Armament

- Guns: 2 x 7.7mm synchronised machine guns in the upper engine cowling

== See also ==
Related development

- PZL P.1
- PZL P.6
- PZL P.7
- PZL P.11
- PZL P.24
