= Polish 162nd Fighter Escadrille =

162. Fighter Escadrille was a unit of the Polish Air Force at the start of the Second World War. The unit was attached to the Łódź Army.

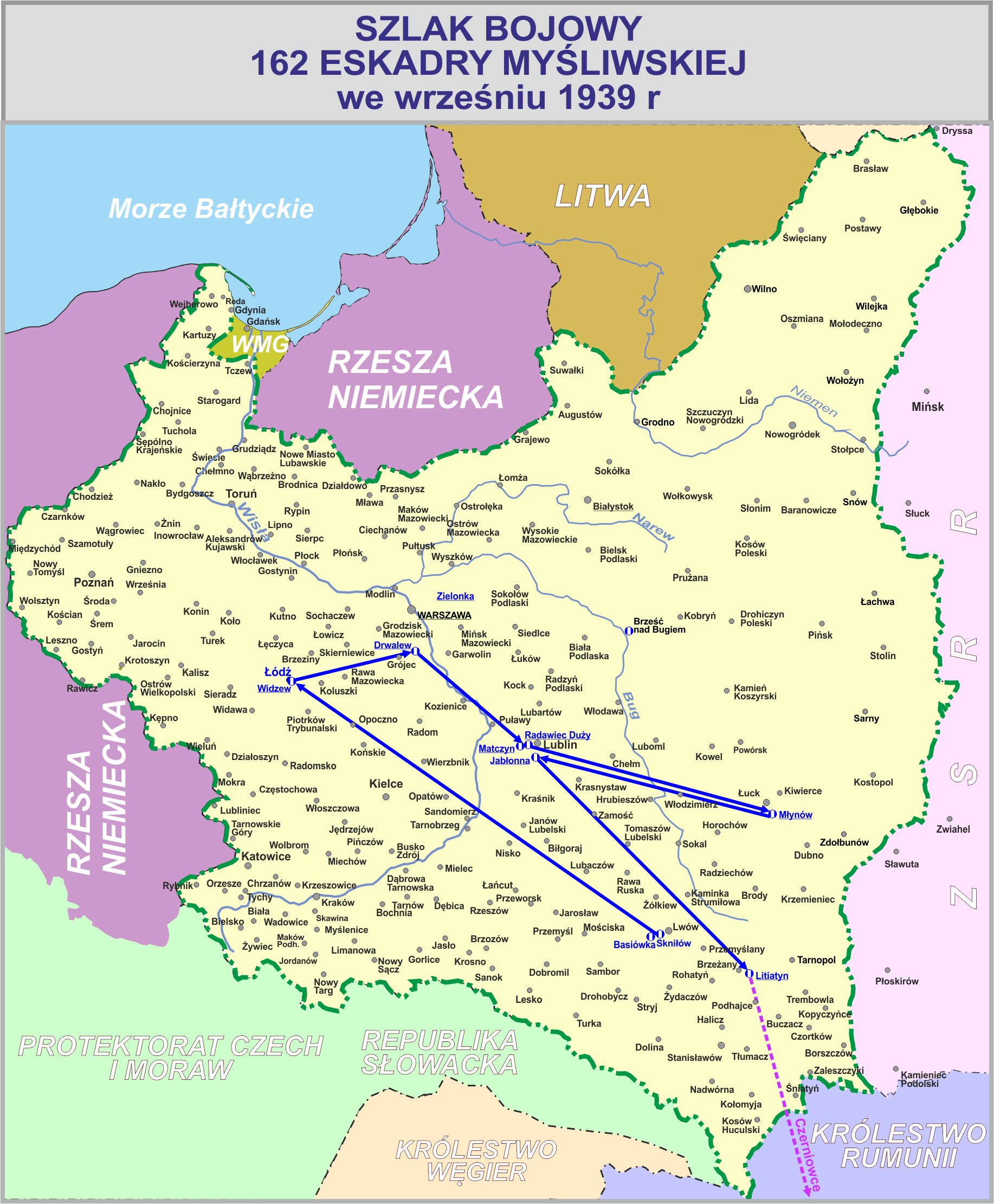

== Equipment ==
10 PZL P.7a fighter airplanes.

== Air Crew ==
Commanding officer: por. pil. Bernard Groszewski Deputy Commander: por. pil. Jan Wiśniewski

Pilots:

- ppor. pil. Czesław Główczyński
- ppor. pil. Zbigniew Szubert
- ppor. pil. Zdzisław Zadroziński
- pchor. pil. Antoni Dzięgielewski
- pchor. pil. Franciszek Kornicki
- pchor. pil. Ryszard Łopacki
- kpr. pil. Kazimierz Kobusiński
- kpr. pil. Jan Malinowski
- kpr. pil. Jan Rogowski
- kpr. pil. Zdzisław Urbańczyk
- st. szer. pil. Tadeusz Andruszków
- st. szer. pil. Zbigniew Brzeźniak
- st. szer. pil. Michał Krzyszowski

== See also ==
- Polish Air Force order of battle in 1939
