= PZL.12 =

1931 prototype of a Polish amphibious flying boat

PZL-12 (PZL-H)
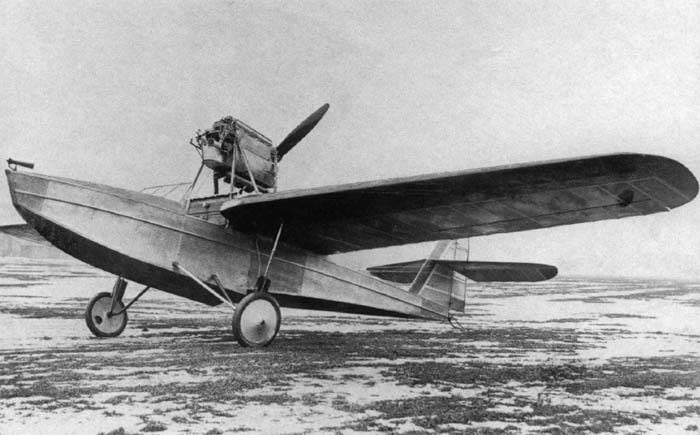

General information
- Type: Touring amphibious flying boat
- Manufacturer: PZL
- Status: Prototype
- Primary user: Poland
- Number built: 1

History
- First flight: February 1931

PZL.12 (PZL-H) was a prototype of a Polish amphibious flying boat designed and built in 1931 by Zygmunt Puławski, a pioneering Polish designer. He was killed in a crash involving this design.

== Design and development ==
The Polish designer Zygmunt Puławski of the PZL works designed PZL-H in 1930, as a small touring amphibious aircraft, for his own needs. The factory agreed to construct a single aircraft for Puławski. At the same time, the Polish Navy revealed interest in training and liaison seaplanes, and PZL-H was proposed to the Navy. In late 1930 the prototype was built in the PZL in Warsaw in a semi-amateur way. It finally was given a designation PZL.12.

The prototype was first flown in February 1931 in Warsaw by Puławski, in a land configuration (without auxiliary floats). The plane was not tested on water. During the sixth flight on 21 March 1931, right after take-off, the plane stalled due to strong wind and crashed in Warsaw, killing Puławski. The death of this talented designer of fighter aircraft was recognized as a heavy blow to the Polish Air Force capabilities. Further work upon PZL.12 ceased.

== Design ==
Mixed construction high-wing cantilever monoplane flying boat. A fuselage of duralumin construction, metal-covered, square in cross-section, split into watertight compartments. A V-shaped bottom was single-stepped. Engine on struts above a fuselage, with a two-blade pusher propeller. Two-spar trapezoid wings with rounded ends, of wooden construction, plywood and canvas covered. A tail of wooden construction. Crew of two, sitting side by side in an open cockpit. Retractable landing gear: main gear folding under wings, rear skid. There were planned auxiliary floats under wings. Fuel tank 100 L.

== Specifications ==
Data from Polish Aircraft 1893–1939, Poser : PZL 12

General characteristics

- Length: 7.8 m (25 ft 7 in)
- Wingspan: 11.05 m (36 ft 3 in)
- Height: 2.9 m (9 ft 6 in)
- Wing area: 19 m^{2} (200 sq ft)
- Empty weight: 440 kg (970 lb)
- Gross weight: 660 kg (1,455 lb)
- Powerplant: 1 × de Havilland Gipsy III 4-cylinder inverted air-cooled in-line piston engine, 97 kW (130 hp)
- Propellers: 2-bladed fixed-pitch pusher propeller

Performance

- Maximum speed: 180 km/h (110 mph, 97 kn)
- Landing speed: 75 km/h (47 mph; 40 kn)
- Range: 550 km (340 mi, 300 nmi)
- Service ceiling: 4,200 m (13,800 ft)
- Rate of climb: 3.7 m/s (730 ft/min)
- Wing loading: 35 kg/m^{2} (7.2 lb/sq ft)

== See also ==
Aircraft of comparable role, configuration, and era

- Nikol A-2
- FBA 17
