= Ikarus IK-2 =

1937 fighter aircraft by Ikarus

Ikarus IK 2
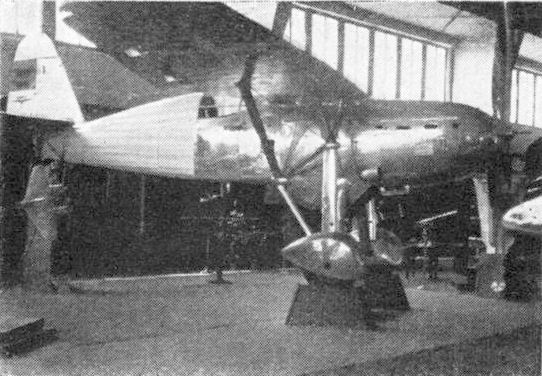

General information
- Type: Fighter
- National origin: Yugoslavia
- Manufacturer: Ikarus A.D.
- Designer: Ljubomir Ilić and Kosta Sivčev
- Primary users: Royal Yugoslav Army Air Force Air Force of the Independent State of Croatia
- Number built: 12

History
- Introduction date: 1935
- First flight: 22 April 1935
- Retired: 1945

The Ikarus IK-2 was a 1930s high-wing, single-seat, monoplane fighter aircraft of Yugoslav design built for the Royal Yugoslav Army Air Force. The IK-2 was designed by French-trained engineers Kosta Sivčev and Ljubomir Ilić, who saw the desirability of developing a home-grown aircraft industry. A gull-wing design, it was armed with a hub-firing autocannon and fuselage-mounted synchronised machine guns. Just 12 production models were built, as the aircraft was obsolescent at the time it was brought into service in 1935, and only eight were serviceable at the time of the German-led Axis invasion of Yugoslavia in April 1941. After the defeat of Yugoslavia, the remaining four aircraft were taken onto the strength of the air force of the Axis puppet state, the Independent State of Croatia, but none survived the war.

== Background ==
In the late 1920s, a scheme promoted by the Royal Yugoslav Army Air Force (Serbo-Croatian: Vazduhoplovstvo vojske Kraljevine Jugoslavije, VVKJ) and the Royal Aero Club of Yugoslavia sent aspiring aeronautical engineers to France to develop their knowledge. It was intended that after this advanced training, they would return to Yugoslavia and be offered specialist roles in the VVKJ or in the aeronautical industry. Ljubomir Ilić and Kosta Sivčev went through this program, but when they returned to Yugoslavia, both were employed in administrative work. Frustrated by this, in 1931 they decided to design a replacement for the Czechoslovak-built Avia BH-33E biplane fighter then in service with the VVKJ. Working in a basement in Belgrade, then in Ilić's apartment in Novi Sad, they devoted their spare time to secretly working on their design. Their original concept was for a low-wing monoplane with a retractable undercarriage, but contemporary thinking led them to modify their initial design into a strut-braced high-wing monoplane armed with a hub-firing autocannon and fuselage-mounted synchronised machine guns. The gull-wing design emphasised power and manoeuvrability over other characteristics.

== Design and development ==
=== IK-1 ===
The aircraft was designed around a French-made 12-cylinder Hispano-Suiza 12Ycrs engine with a Hispano-Suiza HS.404 20 mm (0.79 in) autocannon mounted between the cylinder banks of the engine and firing through the propeller hub. This powerful 860 shaft horsepower (640 kW) engine combined with the hub-firing cannon mandated the use of a metal fuselage. Other armament consisted of two synchronised French-made 7.9 mm (0.31 in) Darne machine guns, mounted under and to each side of the engine. The wing was braced with two struts on each side of the fuselage; the fixed conventional landing gear was spatted and mounted off the wing struts. The fixed tailwheel was also spatted. The enclosed cockpit was located behind the wing. The horizontal stabilizer on each side was braced from below with two rigid braces from the lower tailcone, and tied from above with two flying wires from the vertical stabilizer. The three-bladed propeller was manually adjustable in pitch.

Considerable work was needed to fully develop the design but, by early 1933, the two men had moved the project through the pre-project, basic aerodynamic and evaluation stages, including the building of a wooden scale model that Ilić took to Paris to test in the Eiffel-built wind tunnel. Up to this point, the two men had received no outside help, and had been forced to borrow from family to keep the project going. They then decided to approach the head of the technical department of the VVKJ, Potpukovnik (Lieutenant Colonel) Srbobran Stanojević, with their design. Stanojević was surprised but impressed with their work and an official report proposing to build the design was presented on 22 September 1933. Some senior VVKJ officers opposed the concept, as did Kapetan (Captain) Leonid Bajdak, an "acknowledged outstanding exponent of fighter tactics", who considered that a biplane with a 600 shp (450 kW) engine was the ultimate in fighter design.

Despite this opposition, support from Stanojević and some younger pilots meant that the concept was approved, and in 1934 a prototype was ordered from the Ikarus A.D. factory in Zemun near Belgrade, for delivery by the end of that year. The prototype was designated IK-1, with the "IK" standing for (Ljubomir) Ilić and Kosta (Sivčev). It is believed that the prototype was complete by September 1934, but the first flight was delayed due to concerns about the wing structure. The following month, Bajdak was appointed as test pilot for the prototype, but he did not co-operate in the preparations for the maiden flight, and decided to develop his own test program.

Permission was granted for flight testing to begin in April 1935, and Bajdak conducted his first flight in the prototype on 22 April 1935. For this initial uneventful flight, no weapons were installed and a light fuel load was used. The following day, Bajdak put the IK-1 into unplanned aerobatic manoeuvres, after which the wing fabric was observed as being slack. An official from Ikarus checked it and stated that this would resolve once the fabric varnish had completely dried. Bajdak took the aircraft for a third test flight the next day, which involved more unplanned aerobatics. When the aircraft was at 1,000 m (3,300 ft), Bajdak put it into a shallow dive and pulled up abruptly at high speed, at which point the wing fabric began to tear rapidly, to the extent that it could be seen from the ground. The aircraft dropped into a spin to starboard, and Bajdak baled out safely while the IK-1 crashed into the ground.

=== IK-2 ===
Critics exploited the accident to undermine the IK-1 concept, with Bajdak joining those criticising the aircraft. The three flights were not considered sufficient to give a verdict on the design, and the debate over its future was fierce. This placed significant pressure on the designers, as every element of the aircraft design was subsequently attacked. Eventually, it was generally agreed that the aircraft was well-designed, but it needed more testing. At this point, Ikarus decided to build a second prototype, as it was evident that the hand-sewn fabric seam on the wing had not stood up to the strain of aerobatics, and their workmanship was in question. The second prototype took 10 months to build, with the two designers closely involved.

The main difference from the IK-1 was that the IK-2 had wings covered with metal sheeting, leaving only the rear fuselage and tailplane fabric covered. The new wing was tested with both fabric and metal covering at the request of the VVKJ. Other changes were a radiator of reduced size and improved shape, and modified air intakes, making for a more streamlined fuselage. The two Darne machine guns were replaced with two 7.92 mm (0.31 in) Browning/FN machine guns.

After the second prototype was delivered, the aircraft was placed in the hands of a different test pilot, Poručnik (1st Lieutenant) Janko Dobnikar, who conducted its first flight on 24 August 1934. Dobnikar had worked closely with the designers and Ikarus during its construction and static testing, and his suggestions had resulted in an improved cockpit layout. He strictly followed a completely new test program, while installed testing equipment recorded the various characteristics of the aircraft. After gaining complete mastery of the aircraft, he conducted some aerobatic manoeuvres during a visit by the future Turkish president İsmet İnönü, which included a complete inverted loop. In mid-October 1935, Dobnikar used the second prototype to break the unofficial European air speed record for an aircraft with a fixed undercarriage, attaining a speed of 435 km/h (270 mph), which was also a Yugoslav air speed record. The aircraft was able to achieve greater than expected power at altitudes of 4,000–5,000 m (13,000–16,000 ft). Dobnikar completed the testing program and submitted his report to the VVKJ on 23 May 1937.

After VVKJ acceptance, a group of pilots conducted 16 mock dogfights between the IK-2 and the Hawker Fury I biplane already in service with the VVKJ, during which the IK-2 displayed overall superiority over the British-built aircraft. At one point, Bajdak declared his continuing doubts about the aircraft, and Dobnikar challenged him to a duel, with Bajdak flying his preferred aircraft, the Fury I. After Dobnikar won the climbing competition and a race to Zemun and back from Belgrade, the final dogfight forced Bajdak to concede that the IK-2 was the better aircraft. On 20 November 1937, the VVKJ submitted a proposal to order a batch of 12 IK-2s, which was approved the following month. The production version included some additional improvements, but continued testing resulted in further delays, with the aircraft not entering service for another year. By this time, international consensus had coalesced around the superiority of the low-wing monoplane, and the IK-2 was already obsolescent by the time it was delivered to VVKJ fighter units.

== Operational history ==
The first six production aircraft were delivered to the 6th Fighter Regiment of the VVKJ, based at Zemun, in early 1939. The pilots subjected them to considerable additional testing, before they entered normal service around mid-year. The remaining six entered service during the remainder of 1939. The aircraft were delivered without radios or armament, which were fitted in VVKJ workshops. In October 1939, the IK-2s were transferred to the 4th Fighter Regiment in Zagreb until licence-built Hawker Hurricanes were delivered from Zemun, after which the IK-2s were to be transferred to the 5th Fighter Regiment in Niš. By the end of 1940, all the production IK-2s were concentrated in the 107th Fighter Squadron of the 34th Fighter Group, which consisted solely of IK-2s. This was only an interim allocation, as the other squadron of the group was equipped with Hurricanes, and as soon as the 107th Fighter Squadron could be equipped with Hurricanes, the IK-2s were to move to the 5th Fighter Regiment. The threat of war overtook this planned deployment, and on 13 March 1941, the IK-2s of the 107th Fighter Squadron were moved to Bosanski Aleksandrovac near Banja Luka, under the command of Kapetan Zarko Vukajlović.

When the German-led Axis invasion of Yugoslavia commenced on 6 April 1941, only eight IK-2s were serviceable. One had been damaged in a landing accident, two were at the workshops in Zagreb being repaired, and the fourth unserviceable machine was in a badly damaged condition at Bosanski Aleksandrovac. That day and the next, the 107th Fighter Squadron patrolled over Bosnia but did not make any contact with the enemy. Two machines conducted a combat air patrol over the airfield of the 8th Bomber Regiment at Nova Topola. This pattern continued the following day without incident, but patrol duration and coverage was limited by the short range of the aircraft. On 8 April, a patrol unsuccessfully gave chase to a lone German reconnaissance aircraft, and later in the day, one of the IK-2s force landed, leaving seven operational aircraft.

About 14:00 on 9 April, two Staffeln of German Messerschmitt Bf 109 fighters from II. Gruppe of Jagdgeschwader 54 were observed heading towards Nova Topola just as two IK-2s were landing after a patrol in poor flying weather. One of the IK-2s managed to overshoot and climbed to meet them, but the other was unable to, and had to complete its landing. Podnarednik (Junior Sergeant) Branko Jovanović used the extreme manoeuvrability of his IK-2 to avoid the nine Bf 109s that swooped in to attack, while a total of eight Hurricanes and five more IK-2s from the 4th Fighter Regiment scrambled to meet the Germans. For the following seven or eight minutes, a furious dogfight ensued over Novo Topola, during which two German aircraft were claimed and two Hurricanes and one IK-2 were lost. German records indicate that only one of their aircraft was lost, and that the pilot survived. Podnarednik Stikić survived the loss of his IK-2, but was badly wounded. The Germans, low on fuel, broke off and headed north.

The following day, one IK-2 force landed due to engine failure, reducing the number of serviceable IK-2s to five. Despite deteriorating weather conditions and revolts within the Yugoslav forces, combat patrols continued. At 12:00 on 11 April, all aircraft were grounded by the weather. On 12 April, aircraft of the 4th Fighter Regiment took to the air again, chasing German reconnaissance aircraft, but the IK-2s did not record any victories. The following day, the 4th Fighter Regiment continued carrying out sorties, but around 12:00 the commander of the 2nd Mixed Air Brigade ordered the remaining aircraft of the 4th Fighter Regiment to be destroyed, and all personnel to withdraw via road to Sarajevo.

At the end of the brief campaign, the Air Force of the Independent State of Croatia (Croatian: Zrakoplovstvo Nezavisne Države Hrvatske, ZNDH) made the three or four surviving IK-2s serviceable using other captured aircraft for spares. At the beginning of 1942, there were four IK-2s in service with the ZNDH, but they lacked spare parts. Later that year, an operational IK-2 was observed at Rajlovac airfield near Sarajevo, and in October 1943, two of the IK-2s were operating from Zalužani airfield north of Banja Luka, and remained there for nearly a year conducting strafing missions. At the end of 1943, all four IK-2s were still in service, but at the end of the following year, just two IK-2s remained. No IK-2s survived the war.

== Further development ==
A proposed development of the IK-2 was the IK-4, a dual control two-seater fast reconnaissance monoplane, but it was never ordered.

== Operators ==
Kingdom of Yugoslavia

- Royal Yugoslav Air Force

Independent State of Croatia

- Air Force of the Independent State of Croatia

== Specifications (Ikarus IK-2) ==
Source: Oštrić & Janić (1973, pp. 191–192)

General characteristics

- Crew: 1
- Length: 7.88 m (25 ft 10 in)
- Wingspan: 11.4 m (37 ft 5 in)
- Height: 3.84 m (12 ft 7 in)
- Wing area: 18 m^{2} (190 sq ft)
- Empty weight: 1,502 kg (3,311 lb)
- Gross weight: 1,857 kg (4,094 lb)
- Fuel capacity: 250 kg (550 lb)
- Powerplant: 1 × Hispano-Suiza 12Ycrs liquid-cooled V-12 piston engine, 640 kW (860 shp)
- Propellers: 3-bladed adjustable pitch

Performance

- Maximum speed: 435 km/h (270 mph, 235 kn) at 5,000 m (16,000 ft)
- Cruise speed: 250 km/h (160 mph, 130 kn)
- Range: 700 km (430 mi, 380 nmi)
- Service ceiling: 12,000 m (39,000 ft)
- Time to altitude: 5 minutes 25 seconds to 5,000 m (16,000 ft)
- Wing loading: 103 kg/m^{2} (21 lb/sq ft)

Armament

- 1 × 20 mm Hispano-Suiza HS.404 cannon with 60 rounds in a spiral drum
- 2 × 7.92 mm Browning/FN machine guns with 250 rounds per gun

== See also ==
- Rogožarski IK-3, a Yugoslav single engine low-wing monoplane single-seat interceptor fighter designed by the same men

Aircraft of comparable role, configuration, and era

- Avia B-534
- Hawker Fury
- PZL P.8
- PZL P.11
- PZL P.24

Related lists

- List of aircraft of World War II
- List of fighter aircraft
