= PZL P.24 =

Polish fighter aircraft

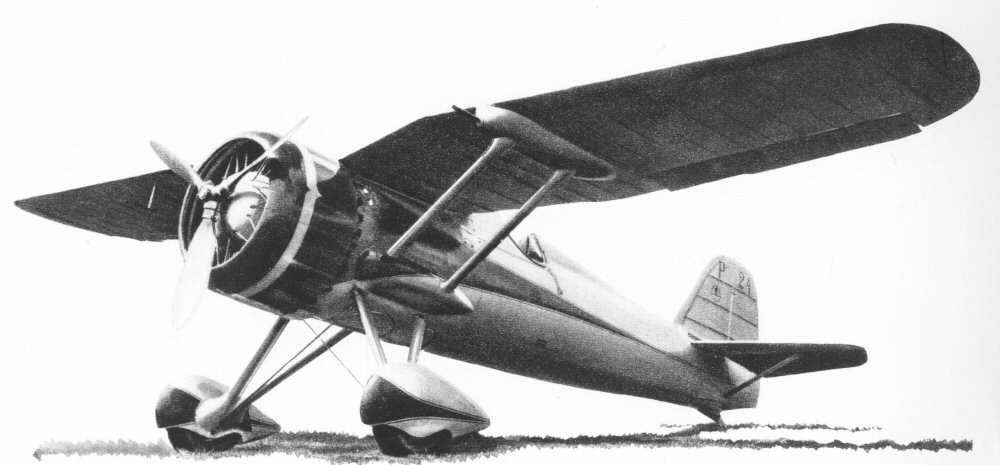
- The second prototype of the PZL P.24

General information
- Type: Fighter
- Manufacturer: Państwowe Zakłady Lotnicze; Industria Aeronautică Română
- Designer: Zygmunt Puławski
- Primary user: Royal Romanian Air Force; Bulgarian Air Force; Royal Hellenic Air Force; Turkish Air Force
- Number built: 212

History
- Manufactured: 1936-1939
- Introduction date: 1937
- First flight: May 1933
- Retired: 1960 Turkish Air Force
- Developed from: PZL P.11
- Developed into: IAR 80

The PZL P.24 is a Polish fighter aircraft, built in the late 1930s by Państwowe Zakłady Lotnicze. It was a much more advanced development of the PZL P.11, a Polish (gull) wing all-metal fighter designed by Zygmunt Puławski.

While the PZL P.11 had been powered with a licence-built Bristol Mercury radial engine, the terms of this licence did not permit PZL to export the engine as well as placing restrictions upon any aircraft that were powered by it. The French engine manufacturer Gnome-Rhône proposed the adoption of their 14K engine to PZL and offered to partially finance the development of a fighter using the engine, which would have no such export restrictions. Accordingly, during early 1932, PZL commenced work on a new derivative of the P.11, which became known as the PZL P.24. The prototypes soon demonstrated favourable performance during testing; notably, the second P.24/II prototype, often referred to as the "Super P.24", established a new world speed record for a radial engine-powered fighter of 414 km/h. The initial production aircraft closely resembled the P.24/II configuration, albeit with some changes such as the adoption of an enclosed cockpit.

In 1936, PZL received orders for the new fighter from several countries. The PZL P.24 entered service with the Turkish Air Force at the beginning of 1937, and with the Bulgarian Air Force in the summer of that year. It was produced under licence by Romanian state manufacturer Industria Aeronautică Română (IAR), who had also licence-produced the earlier PZL P.11. Many elements of the PZL P.24, such as the fuselage, engine cowling, cockpit and tail section, were incorporated into a Romanian-designed low-wing fighter, the IAR 80. In Greece, the Royal Hellenic Air Force was the only air service in Second World War to operate the PZL P.24 as its primary fighter. However, wartime experience soon showed that, as a result of the rapid advances in aircraft design made during the late 1930s, the P.24 had become outdated as early as 1940. Despite a relatively powerful engine and satisfactory armament, it could not stand up against the latest Axis fighters, such as the Italian Macchi MC.200 and the German Messerschmitt Bf 109. Just like the Greek fighters, by 1942, it had become clear that Romania's P.24s were unable to effectively challenge the latest fighters of the Soviet VVS as well, and were relegated to training tasks.

== Development ==
=== Background ===
During the early 1930s, PZL had developed a series of innovative gull wing all-metal fighters, headed by Polish aeronautical engineer Zygmunt Puławski. The P.1, the P.7, and the P.11, each more refined than its preceding aircraft, were capable of outstanding performance for their time and were widely displayed at international exhibitions and competitive fly-offs, demonstrating their capabilities to the world. The Polish monoplanes were subject to considerable international interest, leading to PZL's offices receiving a deluge of enquiries on the topic of prospective export sales. According to aviation author J.B. Cynk, by 1933, outward interest had been expressed by Bulgaria, Czechoslovakia, France, Greece, Hungary, Japan, Portugal, Romania, Sweden, Turkey and Yugoslavia.

In order for any export sales of the type to be successfully completed, PZL had to address two major obstacles. Firstly, the company was only capable of producing so many aircraft in the space of a year; PZL did not have the internal resources to substantially expand its production capacity, nor was financing from the Polish government or other bodies viewed as being particularly forthcoming during this time. According to Cynk, tentative customers for the fighter were typically adverse to making large currency exchanges as part of their payments, instead, they would usually prefer to pay in terms of goods (such as raw resources and industrial products) or to pay in numerous instalments. Furthermore, Cynk claims that several deals which had been formed with PZL had fallen through or had been otherwise postponed due to difficulties encountered in agreeing acceptable terms of payment between the customer and the manufacturer.

Another issue was posed by the engine used by the P.11. It was powered by a single Bristol Mercury radial engine, which was produced in Poland under a licensing agreement with the British Bristol Aeroplane Company; however, the terms of the 10-year agreement had stipulated that none of the Polish-built engines could be exported. In addition, the licensing agreement had placed restrictions upon the sale of those aircraft which were powered by the Bristol engine; these export restrictions were present even if the engines were to be supplied by the customers rather than by PZL themselves. Naturally, PZL was keen to eliminate or otherwise minimise any restrictions that were deterring export sales of their aircraft.

According to Cynk, the initiative to develop a dedicated export-focused derivative of the P.11 received a considerable boost during the early 1930s by a French Air Force initiative to furnish itself with a large force of modern first-rate fighters. While the majority of projects considered by French officials were indigenously developed, the French Air Force was also evaluating various foreign fighters as potential candidates for being licence-produced in France; Cynk claims that the P.11 was at the top of their list. This attention may have contributed to the decision by French engine manufacturer Gnome-Rhône to offer PZL a financial contribution of 150,000 francs towards the development of an export-suitable P.11 derivative, as well as to provide the first prototype's engine for free and to sponsor the fighter for the French competition, all of which was conditional to the selection of their engine to power the type.

=== Project launch ===
In accordance with these converging interests, PZL decided to embark upon preliminary design work into the prospective development of a further evolved form of the P.11 that would be aimed specifically at the export market. The project, and the resulting design produced by it, soon received its own designation as the P.24. The Gnome-Rhône 14K, a powerful French radial engine, had quickly emerged as a strong candidate to power the tentative fighter; thus the engine company's offer of support was quickly accepted. The project was headed by Wsiewolod Jakimiuk, who had assumed the position early on after the untimely death of Puławski on 21 March 1931. During February 1932, the P.24 proposal was submitted for internal approval; this was granted two months later.

During May 1933, the first P.24/I prototype, which was largely based on the P.11a and powered by a Gnome-Rhône 14Kds 760 hp (570 kW) engine, conducted its maiden flight, flown by Bolesław Orliński. This flight had been delayed since January 1933 due to a failure on the part of Gnome-Rhône to promptly deliver either the engine or its three-bladed metal propeller. Even following the installation of the engine and an alternative Szomanski-built propeller, issues were encountered during pre-flight powered runs, such as seizing fuel pumps. The maiden flight had not gone smoothly either; it had been cut short after severe vibrations had shattered the hub fairing, further damage to the propeller blades, engine bearing structure, and fuel tank attachments was also incurred, leading to the forward section of the prototype being reconstructed and reinforced. During October 1933, flight tests resumed.

The experiences with the first prototype had determined that in excess of 150 modifications to various aspects of the design, including the adoption of a long-chord NACA cowling, the reinforcement of a cannon mounting structure and the revision of the exhaust and cooling systems, were required, leading to the construction of a second prototype, known as the P.24/II. Performing its first flight during March 1934, this prototype, also named the "Super P.24", quickly demonstrated its excellent performance, such as its ability to easily exceed 400 km/h in level flight. On 28 June 1934, P.24/II established a Fédération Aéronautique Internationale-recognised world speed record for radial engine-powered fighters of 414 km/h. Following Gnome-Rhône's announcement of the existence of a more powerful 14Kfs engine, a third P.24/III prototype, otherwise known as the "Super P.24bis", was called for, powered by this new engine. However, this engine was not immediately available due to a prior order placed by Finland having taken precedence; as such, the first 14Kfs engine did not arrive until July 1934.

During August 1934, the third prototype conducted its first flight; two months later, it performed a demonstration outside Warsaw attended by various Polish officials and several members of foreign missions. During late 1934, the newly completed P.24/III was publicly displayed at the Paris Air Show, where it reportedly attracted a high level of interest from visitors and other participants alike. According to Cynk, at the time of the Paris Air Show, the P.24 was commonly considered to have been both the quickest and the best-armed interceptor in the world. While the French Air Force were still expressing interest in the P.24 at this point, there was considerable political resistance to the procurement of it due to its non-indigenous origins and that French manufacturers were making their own advances, including some of those that were featured upon the P.24. As such, a French order was not forthcoming for the type.

=== Production ===
During late 1934 and early 1935, the P.24/III was involved in several promotional flights, including evaluation flights held near Warsaw on behalf of visiting Turkish and Romanian military officials, as well as a demonstration tour which saw it visit neighbouring Hungary and Bulgaria. In the spring of 1935, having judged the likelihood of sales to have been high at this point, PZL decided to commence work on a batch of six pre-production P.24s at their Warsaw plant. Unlike the prototypes, these aircraft had enclosed cockpits and the armaments were entirely carried within the wings rather than the forward fuselage, as well as the adoption of wing and tail surfaces reminiscent of the P.11c, alongside minor refinements and alterations. Different armament arrangements were installed across the pre-production aircraft, representative to the configuration that was intended for several separate production models. One pre-production aircraft was shown at the 1936 Paris Air Show, after which it conducted several demonstration flights on behalf of the French Air Force.

Gradually, the pre-production P.24s were modified to closely represent successive production variants of the type; this work included the installation of alternative engines, including the Gnome-Rhône 14N01, the Gnome-Rhône 14N21, the Renault 14T, and the Fiat A.80, which were freely provided by their respective manufacturers. During early 1936, Turkey became the first customer to place a firm order for the P.24, completing a deal to not only by 40 Polish-built fighters, but also a licensing arrangement and the materials to domestically produce a further 20 P.24As. These early fighters, which were furnished with a range of different armaments to conform with the specified Turkish requirements, were otherwise nearly identical to the pre-production aircraft. Production commenced almost immediately; the first deliveries took place in late 1936.

Following the encountering of greater-than-anticipated drag on early production aircraft, various aerodynamic improvements were implemented upon the next variant of the fighter, designated as the P.24C, which made up the majority of the Turkish order. On 29 May 1937, the first Turkish-built P.24 conducted its maiden flight, flown by Izfam Bay. According to Cynk, it is believed that in excess of 100 P.24s were ultimately constructed in Turkey at a peak rate of eight fighters being finished per month. Over time, a large proportion of Turkey's P.24 fleet were reportedly refitted with American Pratt & Whitney Twin Wasp radial engines. Further orders for the type soon came from Greece, Bulgaria, and Romania. These aircraft featured various modifications, including increased endurance, customised armaments, and further aerodynamic improvements.

Despite being an objectively superior fighter to its P.11 predecessor, no P.24s were ever acquired by the Polish Air Force, which preferred to wait for the more advanced PZL.50. When it had become clear that the PZL.50 would not become available in time to counter the now-imminent German attack, figures within the Polish Air Force, such as General Józef Zając, advocated an accelerated purchase of the type. In addition, the viability of such a venture was increased by the issuing of a French armament loan permitting a large quantity of 14K engines to be purchased by Poland. During early 1939, an initial order for 70 P.24Hs was placed. This order was supplemented by orders for a variant of the older P.11, the P.11g, as well. Despite numerous rumours claiming such, there were no PZL.24s in use by the Polish defenders during the Polish Campaign; these rumours may have been a result of the common misidentification of the P.11 as being the later P.24 by German spotters.

As late as 1939, further improvements of the P.24 were being studied. The conceptual P.24K, which was to feature an armament of four 20mm cannon, and the P.24L, a dedicated fighter-bomber design, were amongst the proposals mooted. Furthermore, significant international interest in the type was present at this point. According to Cynk, during 1939, negotiations for several large orders were either at an advanced stage or had been finalised; these customers had included Estonia, Finland, Greece, Hungary, and Yugoslavia. However, none of these orders, tentative or otherwise, totalling in excess of 190 P.24s, would be completed; they were effectively cancelled as a consequence of the German invasion and occupation of Poland during September 1939.

== Design ==
The PZL P.24 was a gull wing all-metal fighter aircraft that drew extensively on the design of the earlier P.11, being essentially a more powerful and export-friendly version of it. It possessed a relatively conventional in layout, but incorporated more recent innovations such as its all-metal structure and exterior covering, along with its then-unusual wing shape. The gull wing, otherwise known as "the Polish wing", was developed by Polish aeronautical engineer Zygmunt Puławski; it possessed several advantages over its biplane contemporaries. One such benefit was the thin profile it presented as it drew near to the fuselage, which avoided obstructing the exterior view for the pilot. The wings used a modified Bartler 37/11a aerofoil section, sharply tapering in chord and thickness towards the tips and roots and incorporating an upwards twist towards the trailing edge for improved visibility; they were largely composed of duralumin, including the twin spars, ribs, and corrugated exterior, which was smooth on the leading edge and wing tips.

The fuselage of the P.24 possessed an oval all-metal structure, the forward section of which comprising built-up girder sections and the rear using a combination of transverse duralumin bulkheads and smooth stressed skin construction. The tail unit, which shared similar construction to the wings, was fitted with a cantilever fin, a braced tailplane, while the elevators were furnished with Flettner tabs. The P.24 was provided with a conventional "scissor-type" fixed landing gear arrangement; each leg incorporated an independently spring oleo-pneumatic shock absorber, built by Avia. The wheels were furnished with spats and worked in conjunction with a fixed skid located almost directly underneath the aircraft's tail section. The undercarriage configuration was a patented innovation.

The P.24 was powered either by a Gnome-Rhône 14K or Gnome-Rhône 14N supercharged geared radial engine, ranging in output from 900 hp to 1,050 hp, which drove a three-bladed metal variable-pitch propeller. The armament was a combination of 20 mm Oerlikon FF cannon and 7.92 mm Colt-Browning machine guns in the wings. On the P.24A, P.24E and P.24F models, it was armed with a pair of cannon and a pair of machine guns, while the P.24B, P.24C and P.24G variants were armed with an arrangement of four machine guns. Fuel was housed with an internal 360 litre tank located within the fuselage; in case of fire or similar emergency situations, this tank could be jettisoned. On all production P.24s, the canopy was fully enclosed; according to Cynk, it provided pilots with exceptionally high levels of external visibility in comparison to other fighter aircraft of the era. The pilot's seat was adjustable and could accommodate either a back or seat-type parachute; it was normally equipped with a Borkowski self-adjusting safety belt system.

== Operational history ==
=== Greece ===
The Royal Hellenic Air Force (EVA) was the only air force during the Second World War to operate the PZL.24 as its main fighter type. Two different subtypes, consisting of 30 P.24F and six P.24G, were ordered and delivered between 1937 and 1938 (an agreement for licence production by KEA was signed, but due to the outbreak of the war, construction in Greece of only one P.24F is documented). Upon arrival, these were split between three Mirae Dioxeos (Fighter Squadrons): the 21st at Trikala, 22nd at Thessaloniki and 23rd at Larissa. The only other operational Greek fighters, stationed further south, were eight Bloch MB.151s and two each Gloster Gladiator Mk Is and Avia B-534 II, both of which were of limited value. During October 1940, the month in which Italy launched its invasion of Greece, the Polish fighter was the Greeks' only modern type in adequate numbers. However, by 1940, the P.24 was no longer a front-runner, despite its use of a powerful powerplant and a satisfactory armament; the P.24 had no speed advantage over the Fiat CR.42, nor could it outfly the nimble Italian biplane, while it was considerably slower than the Macchi MC.200 and the Fiat G.50 it was often pitted against. Its armament was the only real advantage against the Italian fighters, whose reliance on the slow-firing Breda-SAFAT 12.7mm machine guns proved detrimental.

The P.24F, armed with a pair of 20mm Oerlikon FF cannon and two machine guns, gave the Greeks a temporary edge in combat until lack of ammunition and spares forced EVA to re-arm all P.24Fs with four Colt–Browning 7.7 mm MG40 machine guns. Overall, the P.24s performed gallantly during the early period of the conflict, holding their own against impossible numerical odds and despite the fact that their main target were enemy bombers, which forced them to fight at a disadvantage against enemy fighters. Italian claims of easy superiority over the Albanian front were vastly exaggerated and their kill claims even exceeded the total number of operational fighters on the Greek side. In total, Greek fighter losses in combat came to 24 aircraft, while the Greek fighter pilots claimed to have achieved 64 confirmed kills and 24 probables, around two-thirds of which were bombers). By April 1941, however, lack of spares and attrition had forced EVA to merge the five surviving P.24s into one understrength squadron, which was supported by five Gloster Gladiator Mk I and II's and the two surviving MB.151s. That month, these remaining fighters fought hopelessly against the Luftwaffe onslaught, scoring 4 kills (two Hs 126, one Ju 87B and one Do 17) while losing most of their surviving aircraft on the ground. None of the Puławski fighters are believed to have survived the conflict.

=== Romania ===
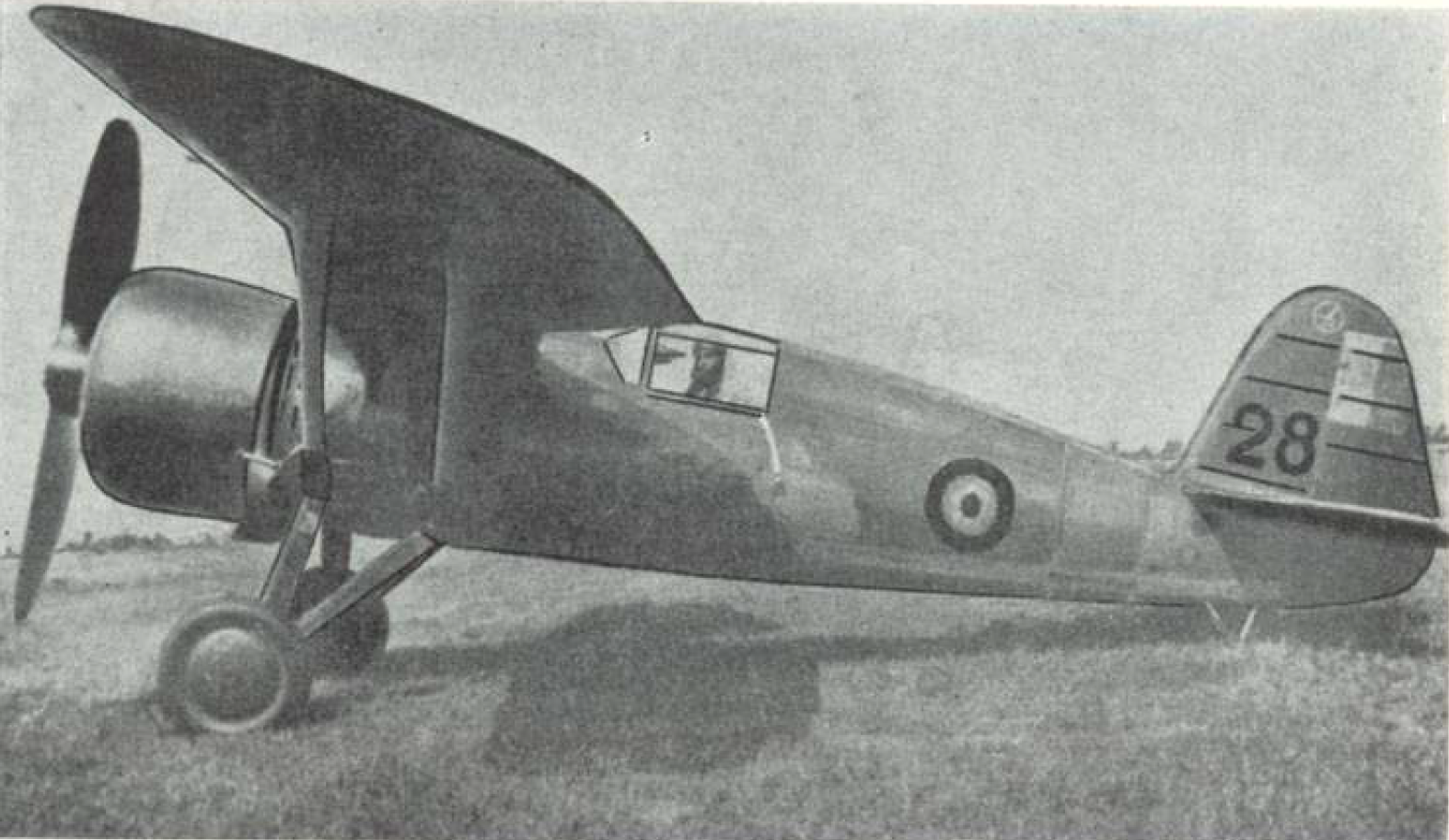
An IAR-produced PZL P.24E

Prior to its procurement of the P.24, the Romanian Air Force had already adopted the P.11F, which was manufactured under licence by Industria Aeronautică Română (IAR) in Romania. The Romanian Air Force acquired a production licence for the type along with an initial batch of six Polish-built P.24Es, which served as pattern aircraft. The P.24E was specifically designed in conform with the requirements set out by the Romanian Air Force, including compatibility with its IAR-built model of the 14K engine, its two-cannon and two-machine gun armament, and various refinements and aerodynamic improvements. Under the established licensing agreement, IAR proceeded with the construction of 25 IAR P.24E fighters by IAR between 1937 and 1939. According to Cynk, the P.24E had played a significant role in the development of a new Romanian low-wing monoplane fighter, which was designated as the IAR 80. Specifically, the new fighter had adopted a fuselage which had been derived from the P.24, along with a nearly-identical tail section, which was paired up to a new cantilever wing and an inwardly-retractable undercarriage.

In Romanian service, the type saw combat action during the Second World War; early on, Romanian P.24s were used to guard the capital city of Bucharest and the Ploieşti oilfields from attacks by Soviet bombers during the start of Operation Barbarossa. Flying from Otopeni military airbase, the P.24 fighters reportedly managed to shoot down 37 VVS bombers, which were typically unescorted and thereby more vulnerable to interception. The P.24E was also routinely used for ground attack missions until the end of 1941; however, after 1942, the type was relegated to training duties because of its obsolescence in the face of improved opposition fighter aircraft.

== Variants ==
During the development of Puławski fighters, a new version of the P.11, the P.11c, was developed for the Polish Air Force. It had a new, reconfigured fuselage, and the radial engine was lowered to give a pilot a better view. These changes were also applied to the new P.24 prototype, flown in 1936.

The P.24A and P.24B models could carry 4 x 12.5 kg bombs, while the P.24C, F and G could carry 2 x 50 kg bombs.

P.24/I
First prototype, powered with a Gnome-Rhône 14Kds engine (760 hp), armed with two 7,92 mm Vickers wz. E machine guns.
P.24/II Super P.24
Second prototype, powered with a Gnome-Rhône 14Kds engine from P.24/I initially, later with Gnome-Rhône 14Kfs engine (930 hp), armed with two 20 mm Oerlikon F guns and two 7,92 mm Vickers wz. E machine guns.
P.24/III Super P.24 bis
Third prototype, powered with a Gnome-Rhône 14Kfs, armed with two 20 mm Oerlikon FFS guns and two 7,92 mm Vickers wz. E machine guns.
P.24A
Armed like P.24/III.
P.24B
The P.24B version was armed with four machine guns.
P.24C
The P.24C was armed with four machine guns and two 50 kg bombs.
P.24D
The P.24D was developed for sale to Hungary, but it was not completed, with Hungary purchasing the Fiat CR.32 instead.
P.24E
The P.24E version was licence-built in Romania by Industria Aeronautică Română as the IAR P.24E.
P.24F
The P.24F was armed with two cannons and two machine guns and bombs and powered with the more powerful 970 hp (720 kW) Gnome-Rhône 14N-07 engine.
P.24G
The last production version was the P.24G, produced from 1937 and powered with the 970 hp (720 kW) Gnome-Rhône 14N-07 engine. The P.24G was armed with four machine guns and bombs.
P.24H
The P.24H was to be powered with a Gnome-Rhône 14N-21 engine (1,100 hp) and carry four cannon or two cannon and two machine guns, but it was not completed. The P.24H was considered for purchase by the Polish Air Force, but progress was slow due to the P.24's similarity to the PZL P.11, which was already in service, and interest in the hypothetically superior PZL.50 Jastrząb then under development. World War II started before any of these plans could be realised.
P.24J
The P.24J version was to be armed with four cannons and was to be sold for export.

== Operators ==
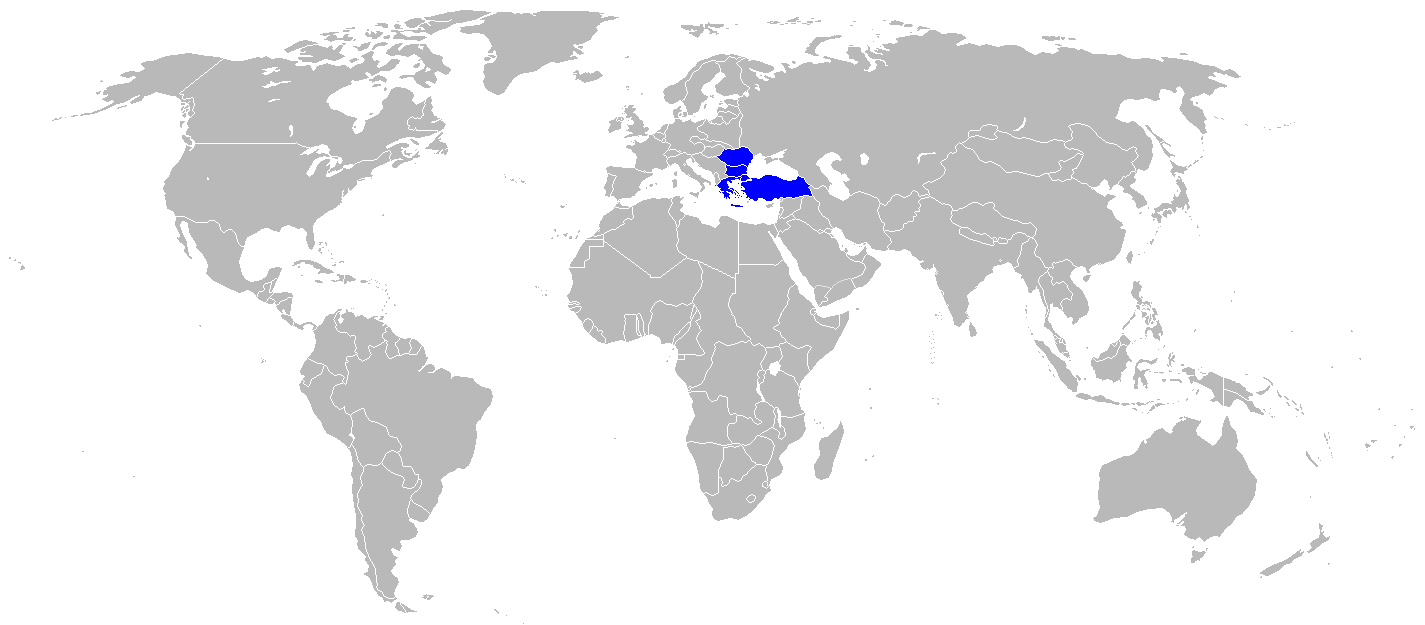
Map showing countries that operated the P.24

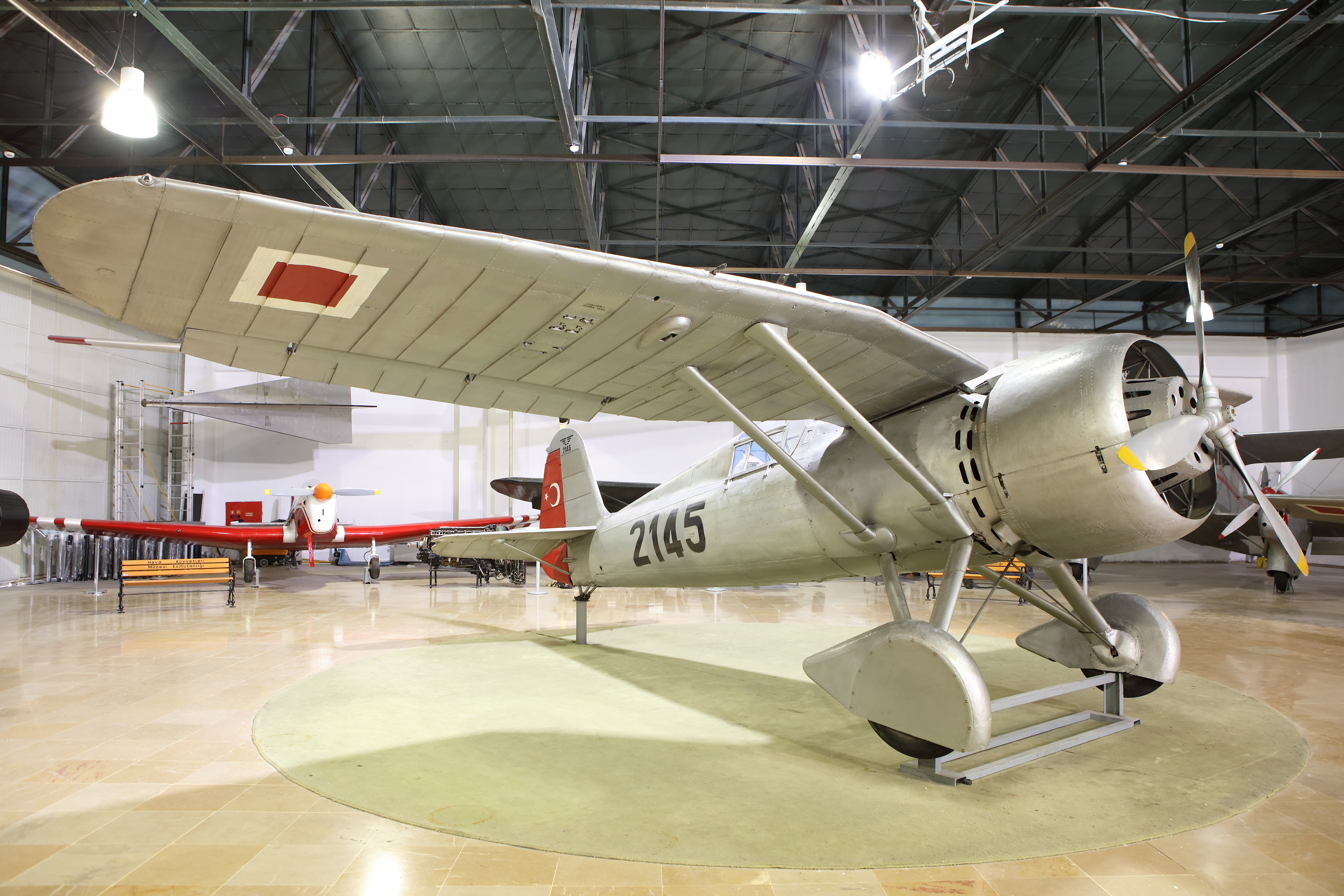
The only surviving example of a PZL P.24. Turkish Aviation Museum, Istanbul

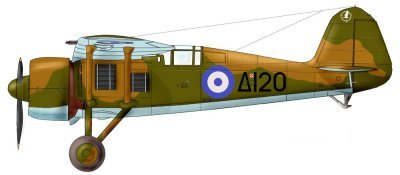
A Greek PZL P.24G, 1940/1941. The Δ120 marking shows that the aircraft belonged to Marinos Mitralexis

Bulgaria

- Bulgarian Air Force ordered 14 PZL P.24B fighters in 1936, delivered 1937–1938. Bulgaria placed a repeat order for 20 PZL P.24C, to be delivered by the end of 1938. It later ordered 26 PZL P.24Fs, 22 of which were delivered from Poland in July 1939, just before the outbreak of World War II. The remaining four, lacking propellers, were bombed in the Okęcie factory in September 1939 by the Germans. The total order was 56 PZL P.24B/C/F.

Greece

- Royal Hellenic Air Force ordered 12 P.24F and 24 P.24G fighters in 1936, delivered 1937–1938. Due to difficulties in obtaining ammunition for 20mm autocannons during the war, all F version planes were eventually rearmed with 4x Colt–Browning 7.7mm MGs.

Romania

- Royal Romanian Air Force ordered 5 PZL P.24E fighters in 1937, acquired a production licence and built 25 E version aircraft in Romania under the local designation IAR P.24P.

Turkey

- Turkish Air Force ordered 14 P.24A and 26 P.24C, delivered by 1937. Another 20 P.24A/Cs were built under licence in 1939 in Turkey at the Kayseri Aircraft Factory (Turkish: Kayseri Tayyare Fabrikası), followed by further 30 P.24G aircraft.

== Surviving aircraft ==
The only surviving example of a PZL P.24 in the world is an example in Turkey. Photographs of the Turkish museum piece show a variety of serial numbering (2015, 2017, 2145, 2147) and are shot at different locations: (Ankara and Istanbul), but original aircraft is mistaken with one full-scale fiberglass replica.

== Specifications (P.24A, P.24B, P.24C) ==
P.24 3-view drawing

Data from Polish aircraft, 1893-1939

General characteristics

- Crew: 1
- Length: 7.5 m (24 ft 7 in)
- Wingspan: 10.719 m (35 ft 2 in)
- Height: 2.69 m (8 ft 10 in)
- Wing area: 17.9 m^{2} (193 sq ft)
- Empty weight: 1,328 kg (2,928 lb)
- Gross weight: 1,860–1,890 kg (4,101–4,167 lb)
- Max takeoff weight: 2,000 kg (4,409 lb)
- Powerplant: 1 × Gnome-Rhône 14Kfs 14-cylinder air-cooled radial piston engine
- Propellers: 3-bladed Gnome-Rhône variable-pitch propeller

Performance

- Maximum speed: 410 km/h (250 mph, 220 kn) at 4,500 m (14,800 ft)

340 km/h (210 mph) at sea level

- Landing speed: 102 km/h (63 mph)
- Range: 700 km (430 mi, 380 nmi)
- Service ceiling: 9,000 m (30,000 ft)
- Time to altitude: 5,000 m (16,000 ft) in 6 minutes
- Wing loading: 105.6 kg/m^{2} (21.6 lb/sq ft)
- Power/mass: 0.38 kW/kg (0.23 hp/lb)
- Take-off run: 100 m (330 ft)
- Landing run: 275 m (902 ft)

Armament

=== P.24A ===
- 2 × machine-guns
- 2 × 20 mm cannon
- 2 × 50 kg (110 lb) bombs

=== P.24B, P.24C ===
- 4 × machine-guns
- 4 × 12.5 kg (28 lb) bombs

== See also ==
Related development

- PZL P.11
- IAR 80

Aircraft of comparable role, configuration, and era

- Dewoitine D.371
- Henschel Hs 121
- Ikarus IK-2
- Loire 46

Related lists

- List of aircraft of World War II
