= Dewoitine D.371 =

French interwar-period fighter aircraft

Dewoitine 371
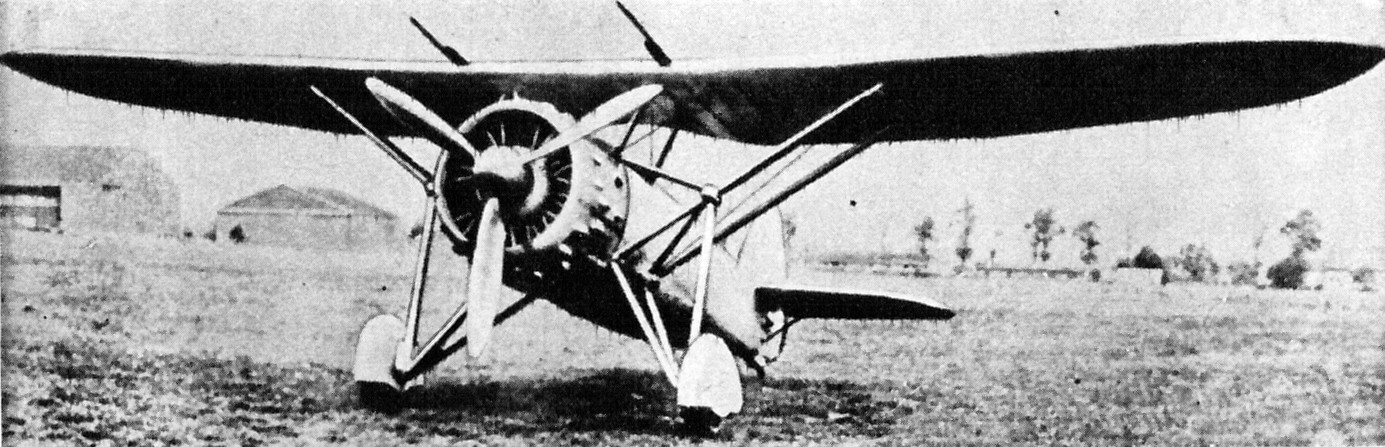
- A Dewoitine D.371

General information
- Type: Fighter
- Manufacturer: Dewoitine / SNCAM / SNCASE
- Designer: Emile Dewoitine

History
- First flight: October 1931

The Dewoitine 37 was the first of a family of 1930s French-built monoplane fighter aircraft.

== Design and development ==
The D.37 was a single-seat aircraft of conventional configuration. Its fixed landing gear used a tailskid. The open cockpit was located slightly aft of the parasol wing. The radial engine allowed for a comparatively wide fuselage and cockpit.

Design of this machine was by SAF-Avions Dewoitine but owing to over work at that companies plant at the time, manufacture of the D.37/01 was transferred to Lioré et Olivier. They were high-wing monoplanes of all-metal construction with valve head blisters on their engine cowlings. The first prototype flew in October 1931. Flight testing resulted in the need for multiple revisions in both engine and airframe, so it was February 1934 before the second prototype flew. Its performance prompted the French government to order for 28 for the Armée de l'Air and Aéronavale. The Lithuanian government ordered 14 that remained in service with the Lithuanian Air Force until 1936, when they were sold to the Spanish Republican government for use in the Spanish Civil War.

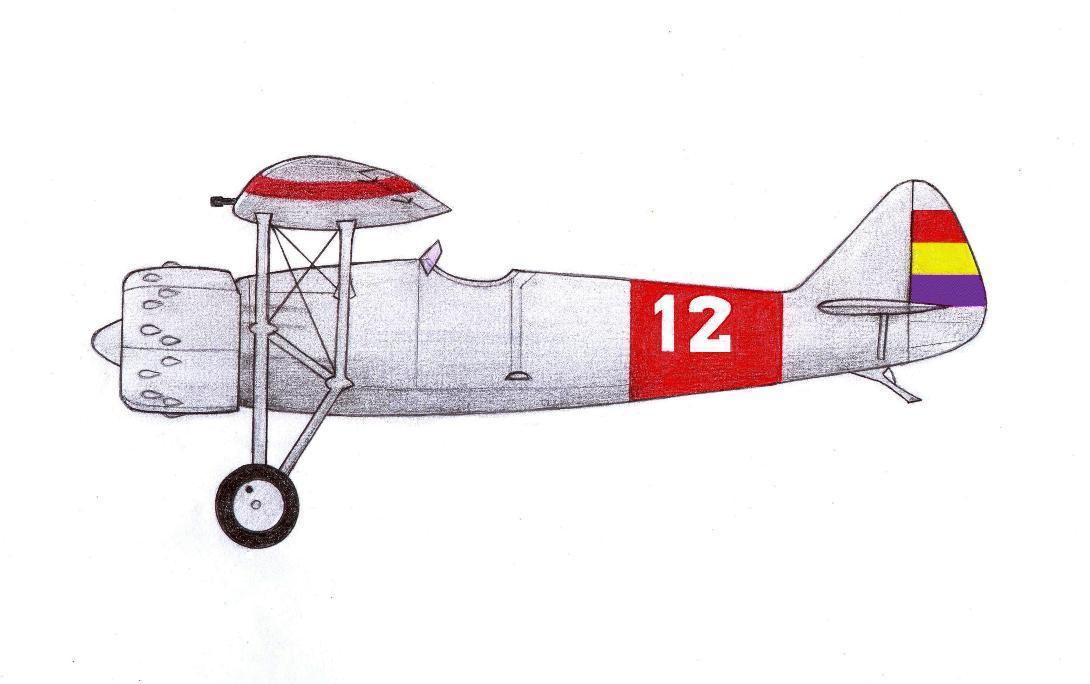
A profile drawing of a D.372 of the Spanish Republican Air Force

== Operational history ==
=== The Spanish Civil War ===
In spite of its superior speed, this design failed to impress and was even refused when exported to Lithuania in 1935. An important competitor of the Dewoitine D.37 family was the Polish PZL P.24, a similar type but with better speed and armament.

In 1936, at the beginning of the Spanish Civil War, 12 or 14 D.371s were sold, unofficially, to the Spanish Republic as part of a squadron of volunteers organized secretly by André Malraux, named España. They were, however, unarmed due to the political stance of the French government that declared its neutrality very early.

In August of the same year, after some negotiations with the French government, three fully armed D.371s arrived in Barcelona, piloted by the mercenary pilots M. Poulain, René Halotier and Henri Rozés. They saw action as escorts of a bombing raid against Talavera de la Reina, Toledo that destroyed the headquarters of General Juan Yagüé. These three D.371s had successfully defended their bombers against the attacks of six German Heinkel He 51 biplane fighters - an older-design aircraft with inferior performance.

The Squadron España operated with these aircraft until the arrival of the modern Polikarpov I-15 and I-16, at which time the three Dewoitine 371s were withdrawn from the front and continued as training aircraft. However, they reappeared later in some squadrons and one is known to have flown with the 71 Fighter Group by the Yugoslav (Slovenian) volunteer pilot Josip Križaj. All Dewoitines left were practically destroyed after having been bombed by the Legion Condor aircraft in the airfield of Bañolas.

== Variants ==
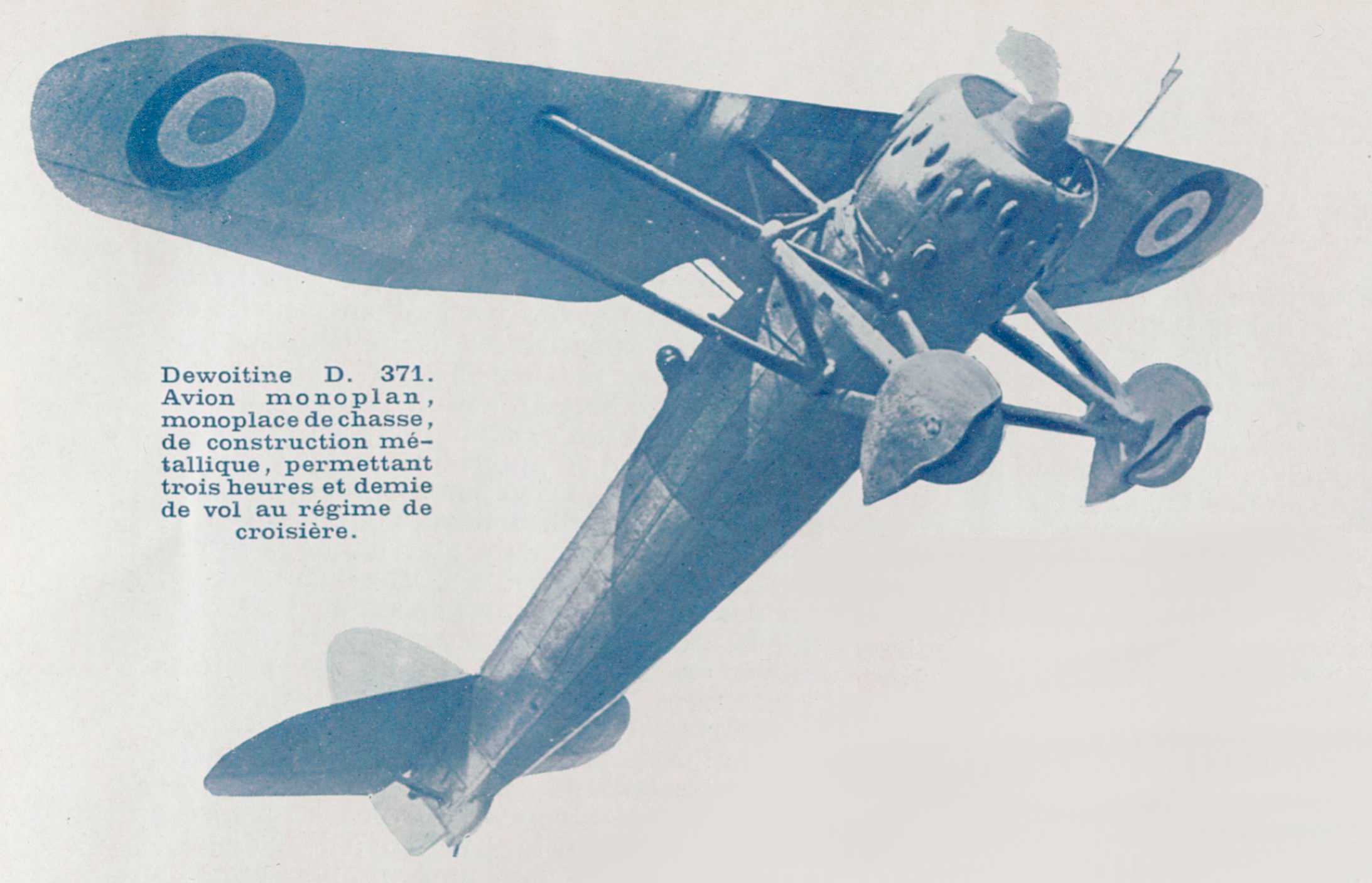
French D-371

D.37 (D.370)
A single prototype constructed by Lioré-et-Olivier, powered by a 550 kW (740 hp) Gnome-Rhône 14Kds 14 cylinder 2-row radial engine.

D.371
The first production version for the Armée de l'Air, first flown in March 1934, powered by a 690 kW (930 hp) Gnome-Rhône 14Kfs; 29 built. Equipped with wheel brakes and two 7.5 mm (0.30 in) MAC 1934 machine guns mounted in the wings, outside the propeller arc.

D.372
Follow-on version, not equipped with wheel brakes, powered by 690 kW (930 hp) Gnome-Rhône 14Kfs Mistral Major engines. Two machine guns were mounted in the engine cowling, synchronised to fire through the propeller arc, and two more were mounted in the wings, outside the propeller arc, some had an armament of two 20 mm (0.79 in) cannon in under-wing fairings instead. At least 14 were built for the Lithuanian Air Force, which were very quickly transferred to the Spanish Republican Air Force, alongside some D.371s.

D.373
Navalised version, 19 built for Aeronavale, powered by a 660 kW (880 hp) Gnome-Rhône 14Kfs engines and armed with four MAC 1934 machine guns.

D.376
Twenty-five folding-wing versions were also built for the Aeronavale.

== Operators ==
A French Dewoitine D.371

France

- Armée de l'Air
- Aeronavale

Nazi Germany

- Luftwaffe – Tested some captured D.37s

Spain

- Spanish Republican Air Force

== Specifications (D.371) ==
General characteristics

- Crew: 1
- Length: 7.44 m (24 ft 5 in)
- Wingspan: 11.79 m (38 ft 8 in)
- Height: 3.19 m (10 ft 6 in)
- Wing area: 17.82 m^{2} (191.8 sq ft)
- Empty weight: 1,295 kg (2,855 lb)
- Gross weight: 1,730 kg (3,814 lb)
- Powerplant: 1 × Gnôme-Rhône 14Kds 14 cylinder two-row air-cooled radial piston engine, 600 kW (800 hp)

Performance

- Maximum speed: 400 km/h (250 mph, 220 kn) at 4,500 m (14,800 ft)
- Range: 1,150 km (710 mi, 620 nmi)
- Service ceiling: 11,000 m (36,100 ft)

Armament

- D.371 - 2 × fixed forward-firing MAC 1934 machine-guns.
- D.372 - 2 × fixed forward-firing 7.7 mm (0.303 in) Browning machine guns in the fuselage and 2 × similar 7.5 mm (.295 in) Darne machine guns in the wings outside the propeller arc.
- D.373 - French naval versions had 4 × 7.5 mm (.295 in) Darne machine guns in the wings outside the propeller arc.

== See also ==
Aircraft of comparable role, configuration, and era

- Curtiss F11C Goshawk
- Curtiss P-6 Hawk
- Hawker Fury
- Heinkel He 51
- Kawasaki Ki-10
- Nakajima A4N
- PZL P.11

Related lists

- List of interwar military aircraft
- List of aircraft of the Spanish Republican Air Force
