= PZL P.11 =

Fighter aircraft in Poland

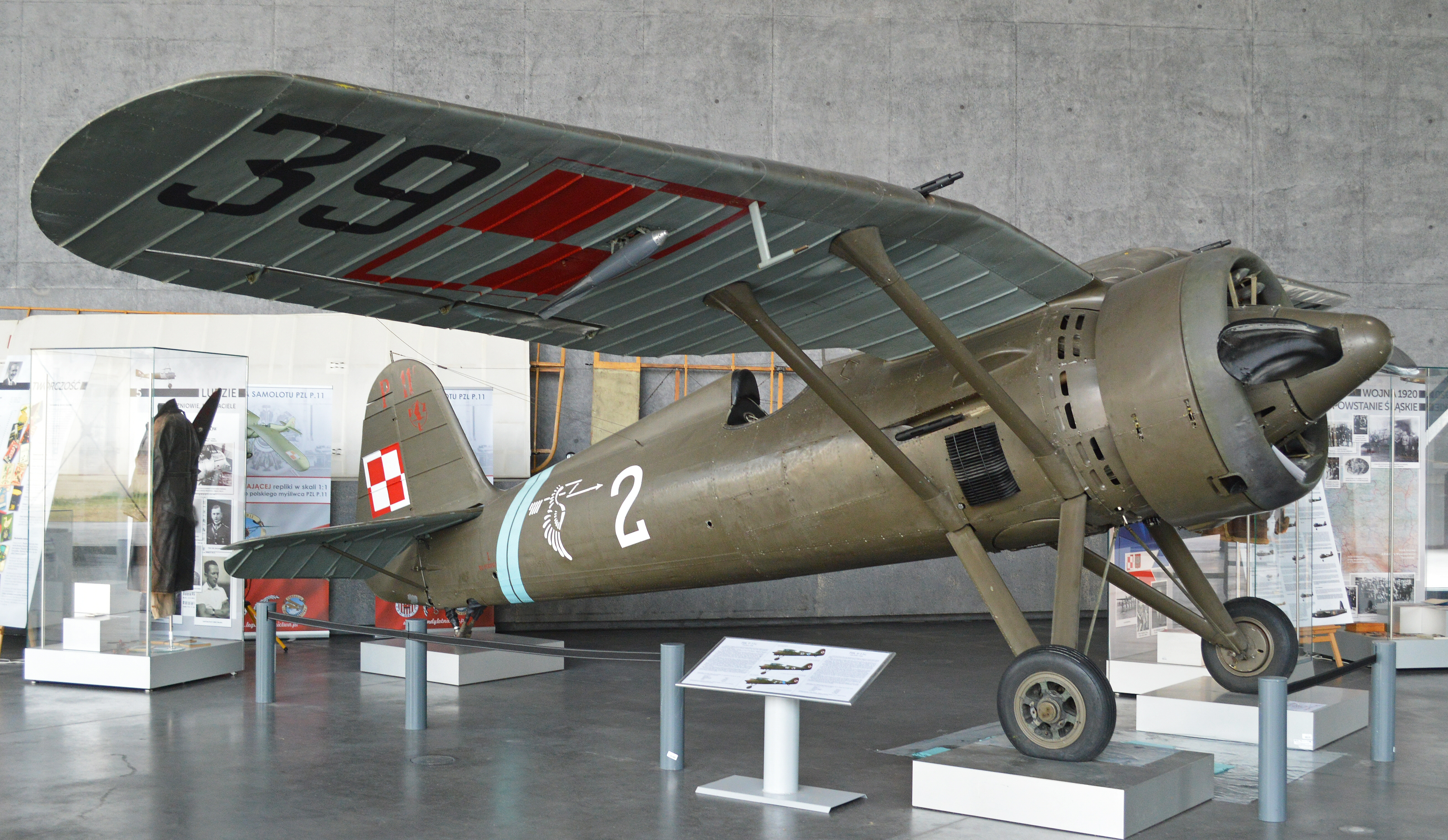
- The sole surviving P.11 on display in the Polish Aviation Museum

General information
- Type: Fighter
- Manufacturer: Państwowe Zakłady Lotnicze; Industria Aeronautică Română
- Designer: Zygmunt Pulawski
- Primary users: Polish Air Force Royal Romanian Air Force
- Number built: 325

History
- Introduction date: 1934
- First flight: August 1931
- Retired: 1944
- Developed into: PZL P.24

The PZL P.11 is a Polish fighter aircraft, designed and produced in the early 1930s by Państwowe Zakłady Lotnicze. Possessing an all-metal structure, metal-covering, and high-mounted gull wing, the type held the distinction of being widely considered the most advanced fighter aircraft in the world at the time of its introduction into service.

Work on the PZL P.11 began in the 1930, based on experience with previous aircraft from the family of fighters derived from the PZL P.1. The primary individual responsible for their development was Polish aeronautical engineer Zygmunt Puławski, who has been attributed as having designed many of their innovative features. While most of the world's air forces still operated biplanes in the early 1930s, the P.11, like previous aircraft in the Puławski family, used a high-mounted and aerodynamically clean gull wing that produced less drag and provided the pilot with a superior field of view. In August 1931, the first prototype conducted its maiden flight. The design quickly drew international attention; the general layout became commonly known as the "Polish wing" or "Puławski wing".

The PZL P.11 served as the basic fighter of the Polish Military Aviation in the second half of the 1930s, including during the German-Soviet invasion of Poland. However, as a consequence of the rapid advances in aircraft development during the late 1930s (seen in such fighters as the Messerschmitt Bf 109), it was outclassed by its rivals at the onset of the war. Many fighter squadrons took up an unequal fight, achieving some successes. It is estimated that as many as 36 P.11s were evacuated to Romania and were subsequently taken over by the Royal Romanian Air Force.

In the early 1930s, the PZL P.11 won a contract for a new fighter aircraft for the Royal Romanian Air Force. During October 1933, deliveries of Polish-built P.11b to Romania commenced. From 1936, Romanian aircraft manufacturer Industria Aeronautică Română (IAR) license-built a further 95 aircraft under the designation IAR P.11f, powered by the Romanian-built IAR 9Krse engines. A more advanced development of the PZL P.11, which achieved much greater export success, was the PZL P.24. In the mid-1930s, several countries expressed their willingness to purchase the PZL P.11, of which Turkey, Bulgaria and Greece decided to acquire the new PZL P.24 instead.

== Development ==
=== Origins ===
The history of the PZL P.11 started in 1929, when Polish aeronautical engineer Zygmunt Puławski began work on the design of an all-metal, monoplane fighter aircraft. Before this, the Polish aviation industry had concentrated on the licensed production of foreign-designed aircraft, particularly French; these typically had wooden structures, so Puławski's all-metal approach represented a considerable advance for Polish industry.

The initial design produced by Puławski, designated the P.1, had many of the features of contemporary French aircraft of the era; these similarities can be attributed to Puławski himself, who had received a considerable portion of his technical education in France only a few years before. Nevertheless, the P.1 also had a number of original features, including its characteristic monoplane wing design. While the majority of the world's forces were still using biplanes, the P.1 had a high-mounted and aerodynamically clean gull wing, which provided the pilot with a superior field of view.

During September 1929, the first prototype made its maiden flight. It demonstrated its outstanding performance compared to contemporary aircraft, such as the British Bristol Bulldog and the French Dewoitine D.27, when it achieved first place at an international air competition held in Bucharest, Romania. The design generated interest around the world; attention was such that the general layout became commonly known as the "Polish wing" or "Puławski wing". This wing had a two-spar duralumin structure, with rivetted ribs to both the spars and skin; the exterior of the wing was covered by finely corrugated duralumin sheet, while the slotted ailerons had a fabric covering.

The Polish War Ministry objected to the aircraft's use of the licence-built Hispano-Suiza engine, citing insufficient practicality and poor economic grounds. Accordingly, a second prototype, which was designated as the P.6, was completed the next year. This revision featured several deviations from Puławski's original vision, including the adoption of a radial engine to power the type in place of the original in-line counterpart; during testing, the P.6's engine was plagued by overheating issues.

=== Refinement and production ===
Following the disappointing performance of the P.6, a further improved design, designated as the PZL P.7, was developed. According to Liss, this revision represented the most significant of the P.11's forerunners. The P.7 was placed into series production, having been ordered for the Polish Air Force, who ultimately opted to procure 150 of the type.

After designing the P.7, Puławski started further variants with larger engines, eventually cumulating in the P.11. During August 1931, the first P.11/I prototype conducted its maiden flight, powered by the British Bristol Jupiter radial engine; the first flight had occurred shortly after Puławski's death in an air crash. It was followed by a pair of refined prototypes, the P.11/II and the P.11/III, which used the Bristol Mercury engine instead. They were later joined by several more pre-production aircraft to test out various configurations of engines, propellers, and other features; these test examples led to the P.11/VI, a production-representative version of the design.

The first variant of the P.11 to be ordered by the Polish Air Force was the P.11a. From the onset, this was considered to be only an interim model of the type; accordingly, a series of 50 such fighters were constructed. Otherwise similar to the P.7, the P.11a mounted the 575 hp (429 kW) Bristol Mercury IV S2 radial engine, which was produced in Poland under licence. Upon the completion of the P.11a order, PZL immediately set about establishing the production of an improved model of the aircraft, which was designated as the P.11c.

The P.11c would be the principal (and final) variant of the type to be inducted into the Polish Air Force. First reaching fighter squadrons during late 1935, it featured the adoption of a new, refined fuselage, a major change of which being the relocation of the engine to be 13 cm lower down in the aircraft's nose, which had the advantage of providing the pilot with an improved exterior view. Besides, a new stronger engine Mercury V S2 had smaller diameter. Forward framework was longer, covering an enlarged and more comfortable cockpit, with pilot's seat moved 30 cm rearwards and raised by 5 cm. The central part of the wings was also modified. During 1934, production of the P.11c commenced, by 1936, the type was being produced at a rate of 25 fighters per month; in total, 150 aircraft were produced by the end of production in 1936 (older sources quoted a number of 175, which is not confirmed in any documents). The first series of approximately 50 P.11c aircraft were fitted with Mercury V S2 of 600 hp (447 kW), the rest with Mercury VI S2 of 630 hp (470 kW).

Apart from Poland, Romania showed interest in the new design. Even before the P.11a entered service with the Polish Air Force, 50 aircraft, designated as the P.11b, were ordered for the Romanian Air Force, while an agreement for licence production was agreed. Deliveries of Polish-built P.11bs to Romania commenced in July 1934. They were fitted with Gnome-Rhone 9Krsd Mistral 595 hp (444 kW) engines, otherwise they were similar to the P.11a. 49 were finally made, the 50th aircraft being P.11f prototype. After the P.11c had been developed, the Romanians decided to switch the licence production to the new model. As a result, from 1936 IAR built 95 aircraft as the IAR P.11f, powered by the Romanian-built IAR 9Krse engine, which was a licensed version of the Gnome-Rhone 9Krse giving 610 hp (450 kW). The Romanians then produced another Polish fighter, the PZL P.24, developed from the P.11 exclusively for export. Greece, Portugal, Yugoslavia, Turkey and Republican Spain were interested in buying the P.11, but finally Bulgaria, Greece and Turkey bought the P.24 instead.

=== Further development and successors ===
During 1934, the year in which the P.11 entered operational service, it was a contemporary of the British Gloster Gauntlet and German Heinkel He 51 and was arguably the most advanced fighter then in service in the world. However, due to a series of rapid advances and technological development in the field of aviation, the P.11 was considered to have been rendered obsolete by 1939. It had been overtaken in terms of performance by a new generation of fighter aircraft that commonly benefitted from features such as cantilever wings and retractable landing gear; such fighters included the British Supermarine Spitfire and German Messerschmitt Bf 109.

Together with the older P.7, both remained the only Polish fighters in service, however, with about 185 P.11s available, distributed within six air regiments and the aviation school in Dęblin. Being aware that the P.11 was now outdated, the Polish Air Force had pinned their hopes on the in-development PZL.50 Jastrząb, which suffered from several delays. When it became apparent that the PZL.50 would not be in widespread service in time for a major conflict that was clearly looming, consideration was given to producing an updated version of the P.11; this was to have been powered by the 840 hp (626 kW) Mercury VIII and have been furnished with an enclosed cockpit, known as the P.11g Kobuz (hobby). Only the prototype of the P.11g with a maximum speed increase to a still-slow 390 km/h (~240 mph) was flown before the war, in August 1939.

In light of the unavailability of PZL.50, the only hope of replacing the obsolete P.11 lay in acquiring modern fighters from abroad. In 1939, after receiving the necessary credits, Poland ordered from France 120 Morane-Saulnier M.S.406s, and from Britain, 14 Hawker Hurricane Is (the P.11's chosen replacement), plus a single Supermarine Spitfire I for testing, in addition to 100 Fairey Battle light bombers. However, none of these aircraft were delivered to Poland before September 1939.

== Design ==
The PZL P.11 was an innovative fighter aircraft for the early 1930s, with a high-mounted gull wing and an all-metal, metal-covered structure. It also had several relatively conventional features for the era, such as a fixed undercarriage. The P.11 was equipped with a pair of 7.92 mm machine guns mounted on the sides of the fuselage; reportedly, around a third of all P.11c-model fighters were fitted with two additional machine guns fixed onto the wings. The fuselage-mounted guns were synchronised, but all others were not; a gun camera could also be installed.The P.11c could carry up to four small 12.5 kg bombs, while the earlier P.11a model was not equipped to carry any.

The P.11 was powered by a number of different radial engines: these included the Bristol Mercury IV S2 (normal: 525 hp (391 kW), maximum: 575 hp) of the P.11a, the Gnome-Rhone 9Krsd (550 hp, max: 595 hp) of the P.11b, the Bristol Mercury V S2 (565 hp, max: 600 hp) or alternatively the Mercury VI S2 (590 hp, max: 630 hp) of the P.11c: and finally the Gnome-Rhone 9Krse (560 hp, max: 610 hp) of the P.11f, the ultimate version of the aircraft. Regardless of the engine used, the unit was mounted upon rubber vibration absorbers inside a forward-mounted engine bay and drove a wooden two-bladed fixed-pitch propeller manufactured by Polish company Szomanski.

The P.11 had an open cockpit, with a Plexiglas windshield. Instrumentation included navigation and engine gauges; while many of these components originated within Poland, one notable exception was the German-built compass. The safety equipment included an arrangement of several flame dampers, a flare gun, and oxygen tanks for the pilot. Only a few P.11s were equipped with radio sets, leading to pilots typically being reliant upon hand signals and pre-arranged manoeuvres to communicate with one another.

The all-metal fuselage of the P.11 was matched to the twin-spar shoulder-mounted wing via bearers mounted on the upper portion of the first and second fuselage frames. The wing and the tail used similar construction techniques, making use of Daude-type rivets, a corrugated duralumin sheet exterior and solid duralumin struts and plates for strengthening. The undercarriage had V-shape streamlined struts, furnished with Avia-type oleo pneumatic shock absorbers (including the tail skid) and were braced with steel wire.

The P.11 had an internal fuel tank inside the fuselage which could be jettisoned in case of fire or other emergency. A high-profile flaw was present in the construction of early examples in the form of its fuel tanks. Originally manufactured by an independent sub-contractor, the tanks were rivetted and covered with a resin sealing agent; however, this technique resulted in joints that rapidly degraded in the presence of vibration. An initial effort to switch to welded joints was catastrophic, having been determined to have been responsible for failures early on in the P.11's service life. Following a decision by some customers to refuse acceptance of completed aircraft using this type of joint due to these failures, extensive testing to evaluate alternative techniques was conducted by PZL, resulting in the problem being entirely eliminated.

== Operational history ==
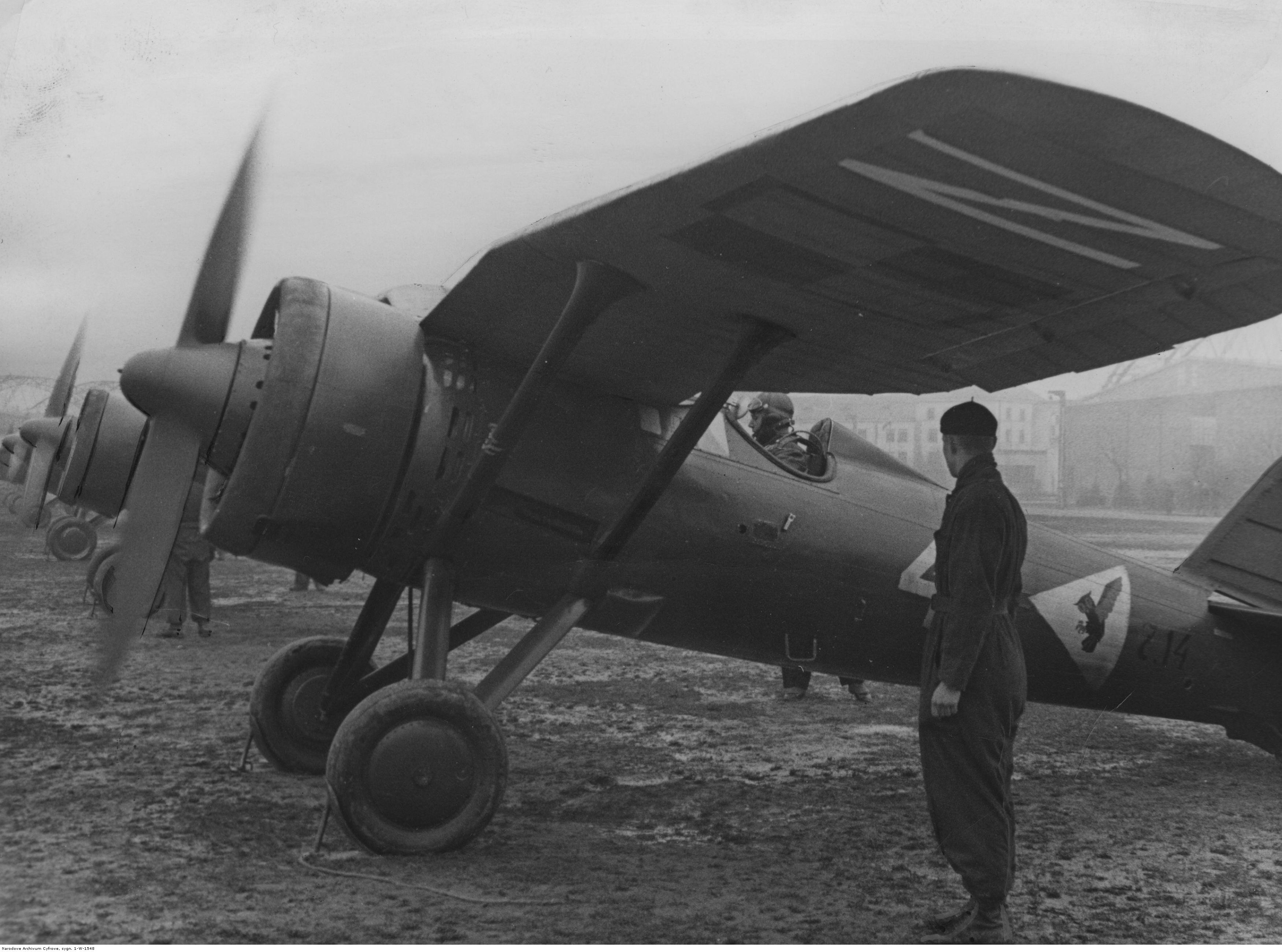
PZL P.11a aircraft

At the outbreak of the Second World War, on 1 September 1939, the Polish Air Force had 109 PZL P.11cs, 20 P.11as and 30 P.7as in combat units. A further 43 P.11c aircraft were in reserve or undergoing repairs. Only a third of P.11c were armed with four machine guns, the rest had only two, and even fewer had a radio. The P.11 were used in twelve escadrilles (eskadra), each with ten aircraft (two escadrilles constituted a squadron, in Polish: dywizjon). Two squadrons—four escadrilles—were in the Pursuit Brigade deployed around Warsaw, with the rest assigned to various armies. All of them took part in the 1939 defense of Poland. Apart from combat units, several P.11 aircraft, including a prototype P.11g, were used in improvised units at air bases.

By 1 September 1939, the fighter squadrons had been deployed to remote improvised airfields and were therefore protected from German air attack on the ground. The P.11 would be up against more modern German bombers and fighters—not only were the German Messerschmitt Bf 109 and Bf 110 faster and better armed, but most German bombers were also faster. Since the P.11 fighters had seen years of intensive use before the war, their maximum speed was even lower than the theoretical 375 km/h. The P.11a's were in even worse condition. In addition, their small total number meant that missions of groups larger than twenty aircraft were rarely undertaken, and reserve machines were almost non-existent.

On the other hand, the Polish fighter aircraft featured better maneuverability than their German counterparts and, as a benefit of their design, much better vision from the cockpit. The P.11 also had a durable construction and a good rate of climb, and could take off from short airfields, even of the rough and improvised variety. It could also dive at up to 600 km/h without risk of the wings breaking off. Theoretically the only limit in maneuvers was the pilot's ability to sustain high g forces. Despite the German superiority, the P.11 managed to shoot down a considerable number of German aircraft, including fighters, but suffered heavy losses as well. The exact numbers are not fully verified. A total of 285 German aircraft were lost according to Luftwaffe records, with at least 110 victories credited to the P.11 for the loss of about 100 of their own. Some of the German aircraft shot down were later recovered and put back into service. This allowed German propaganda to claim smaller combat losses.

At dawn on 1 September, Capt. Mieczysław Medwecki flying a PZL P.11c was shot down by Rottenführer (Foreman Leader) Leutnant Frank Neubert of I./StG 2 (Stuka), having the dubious honour of becoming the first aircraft shot down in the Second World War. The first Allied air victory, the shooting down of a Junkers Ju 87, was achieved 20 minutes later by Medwecki's wingman, Władysław Gnyś, who went on to shoot down a pair of Dornier Do 17s with his P.11c. The P.11c was also the first aircraft to successfully ram an enemy aircraft in the Second World War. The first large air battle of the war took place in the early morning of 1 September over the village of Nieporęt just north of Warsaw, when a German bomber group of about seventy Heinkel He 111 and Dornier Do 17 was intercepted by some twenty P.11 and ten P.7 fighters, and had to abandon their mission to Warsaw. The following day, nine PZL P.11s of No. 142 Squadron, led by Captain Mirosław Leśniewski, intercepted two formations of Dornier Do 17 on river Vistula. Attacking head on, the Polish pilots managed to shoot down seven twin-engined bombers, two of them credited to Lieutenant Stanisław Skalski (future Distinguished Flying Cross & Two Bars) for no losses to themselves. Most of the P.11s were destroyed in 1939, though thirty-six were flown to Romania and taken over by the Romanian Air Force. Due to their obsolescence, these veteran aircraft were not used in combat; only a small number were used for training while the rest were dismantled for spare parts. It has been alleged that some aircraft were captured and saw limited use by the Germans. A pair of P.11s were captured by the Red Army and used for testing. One landed in Hungary (near the town of Hajdúböszörmény) and was used as a glider tow plane by the University of Technology in Budapest.

== Variants ==
P.11/I
First prototype of the P.11 fighter, powered by a 384 kW (515 hp) Gnome-Rhône Jupiter IX ASb.
P.11/II
Second prototype of the P.11 fighter, powered by a 395 kW (530 hp) Bristol Mercury IV.A in a long chord cowling. Used for comparative tests of Letov Kbely, Bristol, Ratier, Szomański and Chauvière fixed pitch wooden propellers, achieving a best speed of 346 km/h (215 mph) at 4,000 m (13,123 ft) with the Chauvière.
P.11/III
Production prototype of the P.11 fighter, powered by a Bristol Mercury, with simplified structure to ease production.
P.11a
The initial version for the Lotnictwo Wojskowe (Polish Air Force), which ordered fifty, actually built after completion of the Romanian P.11b order, powered by 370.6 kW (497 hp) – 385.5 kW (517 hp) Polish Skoda Works Mercury IV.S2 engines.
P.11b
Fifty aircraft ordered by the Romanian Government, powered by 391.5 kW (525 hp) Gnome-Rhône 9K Mistral or IAR 9K Mistral engines. 49 were actually built.
P.11c
The main production version for Lotnictwo Wojskowe. 150 built.
P.11f
95 aircraft, powered by 449 kW (602 hp) IAR 9K Mistral engines, built as licence production by IAR in Romania.
P.11g Kobuz
Developed as a stop-gap to fill in for delayed PZL.50 Jastrząb fighters by strengthening the structure to absorb the power of a single 626.37 kW (840 hp) Mercury VIII, with an enclosed cockpit and four improved 7.92 mm (0.312 in) km wz. 36 machine-guns. The converted P.11c prototype flew for the first time on 15 August 1939, less than a month before the German invasion, forcing abandonment of the programme.

== Operators ==
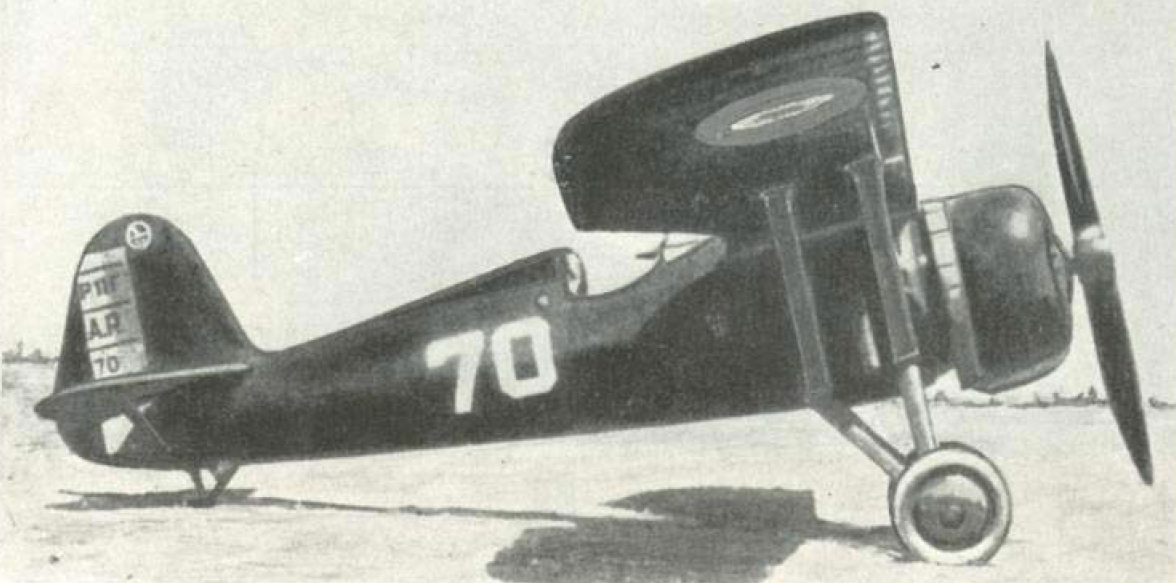
IAR-produced PZL P.11f

Hungary

- Hungarian Air Force operated one ex-Polish Air Force PZL P.11a evacuated on 23 September 1939.

Latvia

- Latvian Air Force operated one ex-Polish Air Force PZL P.11a evacuated on 17 September 1939.

Poland

- Polish Air Force

Romania

- Royal Romanian Air Force

Soviet Union

- Soviet Air Force took over the Latvian machine when they invaded Latvia 17 June 1940, and two more (see above) as war prizes.

== Surviving aircraft ==
The sole surviving P.11c aircraft is on display in the Polish Aviation Museum in Kraków.

== Specifications (PZL P.11c with Mercury VI.S2 engine) ==
PZL P.11c 3-view drawing

Data from Polish Aircraft 1893-1939, and The PZL P.11

General characteristics

- Crew: 1
- Length: 7.55 m (24 ft 9 in)
- Wingspan: 10.719 m (35 ft 2 in)
- Height: 2.85 m (9 ft 4 in)
- Wing area: 17.9 m^{2} (193 sq ft)
- Empty weight: 1,147 kg (2,529 lb)
- Gross weight: 1,630 kg (3,594 lb)
- Max takeoff weight: 1,800 kg (3,968 lb)
- Powerplant: 1 × Bristol Mercury V.S2 9-cylinder air-cooled radial piston engine, 420 kW (560 shp)
- Propellers: 2-bladed Szomański fixed pitch wooden propeller

Performance

- Maximum speed: 390 km/h (240 mph, 210 kn) at 5,000 m (16,000 ft), 300 km/h (190 mph) at sea level
- Stall speed: 98 km/h (61 mph, 53 kn)
- Range: 700 km (430 mi, 380 nmi)
- Service ceiling: 8,000 m (26,000 ft) absolute ceiling 11,000 m (36,000 ft)
- Time to altitude:
  - 5,000 m (16,000 ft) in 6 minutes
  - 7,000 m (23,000 ft) in 13 minutes
- Wing loading: 91.1 kg/m^{2} (18.7 lb/sq ft)
- Power/mass: 0.279 kW/kg (0.166 hp/lb)

Armament

- Guns:
  - 2 x 7.92 mm (0.312 in) wz. 33 machine guns in fuselage with 500 rpg.
  - optionally additional 2 × 7.92 mm (0.312 in) wz. 33 machine guns in wings with 300 rpg.

== See also ==
Related development

- PZL P.7
- PZL P.24
- IAR-80
- Historical PZL P.11c, a homebuilt scale replica of the PZL P.11c

Aircraft of comparable role, configuration, and era

- Aero A.102
- Dewoitine D.37
- Dewoitine D.560
- Ikarus IK-2
- Loire 43
- Morane-Saulnier M.S.225
- Nakajima Army Type 91 fighter
- Nieuport-Delage NiD-120

Related lists

- List of aircraft of World War II
