= Polish Air Force order of battle in 1939 =

The following is the order of battle of the Polish Air Force prior to the outbreak of the Polish Defensive War of 1939. During the mobilization waves of March and August of that year, all peace-time units were deployed to airfields throughout the country and attached to respective commands of Air Force, Naval Air Service and squadrons supporting each of the Polish armies. In the last stages of the air campaign, whole units coordinated all actions in the fight against the invaders.

The Polish fighters claimed 134 air victories, including 7 enemy aeroplanes shot down by Polish PZL P.7a fighters, 125 by PZL P.11 fighters of all types (mostly P.11c, several P.11a), and 2 downed by PZL P.11g. In addition, the Polish air forces had a number of PZL.37 Łoś and PZL.23 Karaś bombers, as well as a number of non-combat planes used for reconnaissance, observation, communications, army cooperation and transport. Among the latter were Lublin R-XIII, LWS-3 Mewa, RWD-8, RWD-14 Czapla, PWS-10 and PWS-26.

== Command structure ==
The Polish war-time command structure was based on inter-war structure of the air forces. Apart from two air brigades held in reserve by the Commander in Chief (one of them being the Bomber Brigade, the other - Pursuit Brigade), Polish forces were divided onto the following units:

- Air regiment (Polish: pułk lotniczy) (Wing or Group) usually 4 squadrons or 8 escadrilles / Flights.
- Air squadron (Polish: dywizjon lotniczy) (Squadron) usually 2 escadrilles / Flights.
- Air escadrille (Polish: eskadra lotnicza) (Flight) usually 8 to 12 planes.

Each escadrille was given a respective number and a proper name, depending on its main tasks. Hence the escadrilles were divided onto:

- Bombing escadrille (Polish: eskadra bombowa)
- Fighter escadrille (Polish: eskadra myśliwska)
- Observation escadrille (Polish: eskadra obserwacyjna)
- Reconnaissance escadrille (Polish: eskadra rozpoznawcza)
- Staff escadrille (Polish: eskadra sztabowa)

The second number in the name of each of the fighter squadrons shows part of which air regiment the unit was part of, prior to mobilisation. For example, the III/1 dywizjon myśliwski (composed of 111 eskadra myśliwska and 112 eskadra myśliwska) was part of the 1st Air Regiment located in Warsaw.

== Reserve of the Commander in Chief ==
The strategic reserve of the commander in chief of the Polish Army consisted of two air brigades stationed around Warsaw and additional communications squadrons used for easier handling of orders from the headquarters to respective armies. Altogether, on 1 September 1939 Edward Rydz-Śmigły had 146 combat aeroplanes and 60 non-combat planes at his disposal.

=== HQ units ===
- Communications platoon No. 1 (Pluton łącznikowy nr 1)
- Communications platoon No. 2 (Pluton łącznikowy nr 2)
- Polish 16th Observation Escadrille
- Staff Escadrille

=== Pursuit Brigade (Brygada Poscigowa) ===
- Polish 1st Fighter Squadron of the 3rd Air Regiment (III/1. Dywizjon Myśliwski)
  - Polish 111th Fighter Escadrille (111 Eskadra Myśliwska)
  - Polish 112th Fighter Escadrille (112 Eskadra Myśliwska)
- Polish 1st Fighter Squadron of the 4th Air Regiment (IV/1 Dywizjon Myśliwski)
  - Polish 113th Fighter Escadrille (113 Eskadra Myśliwska)
  - Polish 114th Fighter Escadrille (114 Eskadra Myśliwska)
  - Polish 123rd Fighter Escadrille (123 Eskadra Myśliwska)

=== Bomber Brigade ===
- Polish 10th Bomber Squadron (X Dywizjon Bombowy)
  - Polish 211th Bomber Escadrille (211. Eskadra Bombowa)
  - Polish 212th Bomber Escadrille (212. Eskadra Bombowa)
- Polish 15th Bomber Squadron (XV Dywizjon Bombowy)
  - Polish 216th Bomber Escadrille (216. Eskadra Bombowa)
  - Polish 217th Bomber Escadrille (217. Eskadra Bombowa)
- Polish 2nd Bomber Squadron (II Dywizjon Bombowy)
  - Polish 21st Bomber Escadrille (21. Eskadra Bombowa)
  - Polish 22nd Bomber Escadrille (22. Eskadra Bombowa)
- Polish 6th Bomber Squadron (VI Dywizjon Bombowy)
  - Polish 64th Bomber Escadrille (64. Eskadra Bombowa)
  - Polish 65th Bomber Escadrille (65. Eskadra Bombowa)
- Polish 55th Independent Bomber Escadrille (55. Samodzielna Eskadra Bombowa)
- Communications platoon No. 4 (Pluton łącznikowy nr 4)
- Communications platoon No. 12 (Pluton łącznikowy nr 12)

== Army aviation ==
In addition to the above-mentioned units, the gros of the Polish aviation was attached to land units of corps- and army-size. They were to provide necessary support in all roles. In all, various units of the Polish Army had 288 planes at their disposal, including 246 combat planes and 42 support planes.

=== Aviation of the Modlin Army ===
- Communications platoon No. 11 (Pluton łącznikowy nr 11)
- Polish 41st Reconnaissance Escadrille (41. Eskadra Rozpoznawcza)
- III/5. Fighter Squadron (III/5. Dywizjon Myśliwski)
  - Polish 152nd Fighter Escadrille (152. Eskadra Myśliwska)
- Polish 53rd Observation Escadrille (53. Eskadra Obserwacyjna)

=== Aviation of the Pomorze Army ===
- Communications platoon No. 7 (Pluton łącznikowy nr 7)
- Communications platoon No. 8 (Pluton łącznikowy nr 8)
- Polish 42nd Reconnaissance Escadrille (42. Eskadra Rozpoznawcza)
- (III/4. Dywizjon Myśliwski)
  - Polish 141st Fighter Escadrille (141. Eskadra Myśliwska)
  - Polish 142nd Fighter Escadrille (142. Eskadra Myśliwska)
- Polish 43rd Observation Escadrille (43. Eskadra Obserwacyjna)
- Polish 46th Observation Escadrille (46. Eskadra Obserwacyjna)

=== Aviation of the Poznań Army ===
- Communications platoon No. 6 (Pluton łącznikowy nr 6)
- Polish 34th Reconnaissance Escadrille (34. Eskadra Rozpoznawcza)
- (III/3. Dywizjon Myśliwski)
  - Polish 131st Fighter Escadrille (131. Eskadra Myśliwska)
  - Polish 132nd Fighter Escadrille (132. Eskadra Myśliwska)
- Polish 33rd Observation Escadrille (33. Eskadra Obserwacyjna)
- Polish 36th Observation Escadrille (36. Eskadra Obserwacyjna)

=== Aviation of the Łódź Army ===
- Communications platoon No.10 (Pluton łącznikowy nr 10)
- Polish 32nd Reconnaissance Escadrille (32. Eskadra Rozpoznawcza)
- (III/6. Dywizjon Myśliwski)
  - Polish 161st Fighter Escadrille (161. Eskadra Myśliwska)
  - Polish 162nd Fighter Escadrille(162. Eskadra Myśliwska)
- Polish 63rd Observation Escadrille (63. Eskadra Obserwacyjna)
- Polish 66th Observation Escadrille (66. Eskadra Obserwacyjna)

=== Aviation of the Kraków Army ===
- Communications platoon No.3 (Pluton łącznikowy nr 3)
- Polish 24th Reconnaissance Escadrille (24. Eskadra Rozpoznawcza)
- (III/2. Dywizjon Myśliwski)
  - Polish 121st Fighter Escadrille (121. Eskadra Myśliwska)
  - Polish 122nd Fighter Escadrille (122. Eskadra Myśliwska)
- Polish 23rd Observation Escadrille (23. Eskadra Obserwacyjna)
- Polish 26th Observation Escadrille (26. Eskadra Obserwacyjna)

=== Aviation of the Karpaty Army ===
- Communications platoon No.5 (Pluton łącznikowy nr 5)
- Polish 31st Reconnaissance Escadrille (31. Eskadra Rozpoznawcza)
- Polish 56th Observation Escadrille (56. Eskadra Obserwacyjna)

=== Aviation of the Narew Independent Operational Group ===
- Communications platoon No.9 (Pluton łącznikowy nr 9)
- Polish 51st Reconnaissance Escadrille (51. Eskadra Rozpoznawcza)
- Polish 151st Fighter Escadrille (151. Eskadra Myśliwska)
- Polish 13th Observation Escadrille (13. Eskadra Obserwacyjna)

== Naval aviation ==
- Naval Air Squadron (Morski Dywizjon Lotniczy)
  - Long Range Reconnaissance Escadrille (I Eskadra Dalekiego Rozpoznania)
  - Short Range Reconnaissance Escadrille (II Eskadra Bliskiego Rozpoznania)
- Communications platoon of the Command of Coastal Defense (Pluton łącznikowy Dowództwa Lądowej Obrony Wybrzeża)

== Aircraft in active service in September 1939 ==
=== Combat aircraft ===
- PZL P.7
- PZL P.11
- PZL.23 Karaś A/B
- PZL.37 Łoś A/B.
- PZL.43
- PZL.46 Sum (PZL.46/I prototype) (one example)
- Lublin R-XIIIG
- Lublin R-VIIIbis (for Navy use)
- LWS-3 Mewa (two examples)
- RWD-8
- RWD-14 Czapla

=== Support aircraft ===
- PWS-26
- PWS-24bis
- PWS-35 Ogar (one example)
- LWS-6 Zubr
- RWD-5 (one)
- RWD-8
- RWD-13
- RWD-17W
- Bartel BM-4
- Lublin R-XVI (air ambulances)

== See also ==
- Polish volunteer wings in Allied Air forces,1940-45
