= Łagiewniki, Włocławek County =

Łagiewniki
- Village
- Location within Poland
- Coordinates: 52°33′N 19°3′E
- Country: Poland
- Voivodeship: Kuyavian-Pomeranian
- County: Włocławek
- Gmina: Włocławek

Population (2011)
  - Total: 155
- Time zone: UTC+1 (CET)
  - Summer (DST): UTC+2 (CEST)
- Postal code: 87-853
- Area code: +48 54
- Car plates: CWL

Łagiewniki (Note: Polish pronunciation: [waɡʲɛvˈniki]; German until 1945: Schönlage) is a village in the Kuyavian-Pomeranian Voivodeship, Poland, located within the gmina (municipality) Gmina Włocławek, in the Włocławek County. In 2011, it was inhabited by 155 people.

== History ==
The village was listed in 16th-century documents as a royal village, a village which either received privileges from, or was founded by, the King of Poland.

In the Second World War, during the invasion of Poland, the Polish 43rd Observation Escadrille was stationed in the village.

A part of Łagiewniki was formerly known locally as Nowy Jork (Polish for New York), from a nickname given by the parish priest in the 1950s, perhaps due to its distance from the village centre or its perceived prosperity. This name came to be listed in the official records of place names, and was among the 365 names changed or delisted by the Polish Ministry of Internal Affairs effective 1 January 2010. The delisting of Nowy Jork attracted nationwide television and press coverage.
