= Polish 63rd Observation Escadrille =

Unit of the Polish Air Force in the Second World War

The 63rd Observation Escadrille was a unit of the Polish Air Force at the beginning of the Second World War. The unit was attached to the Łódź Army.

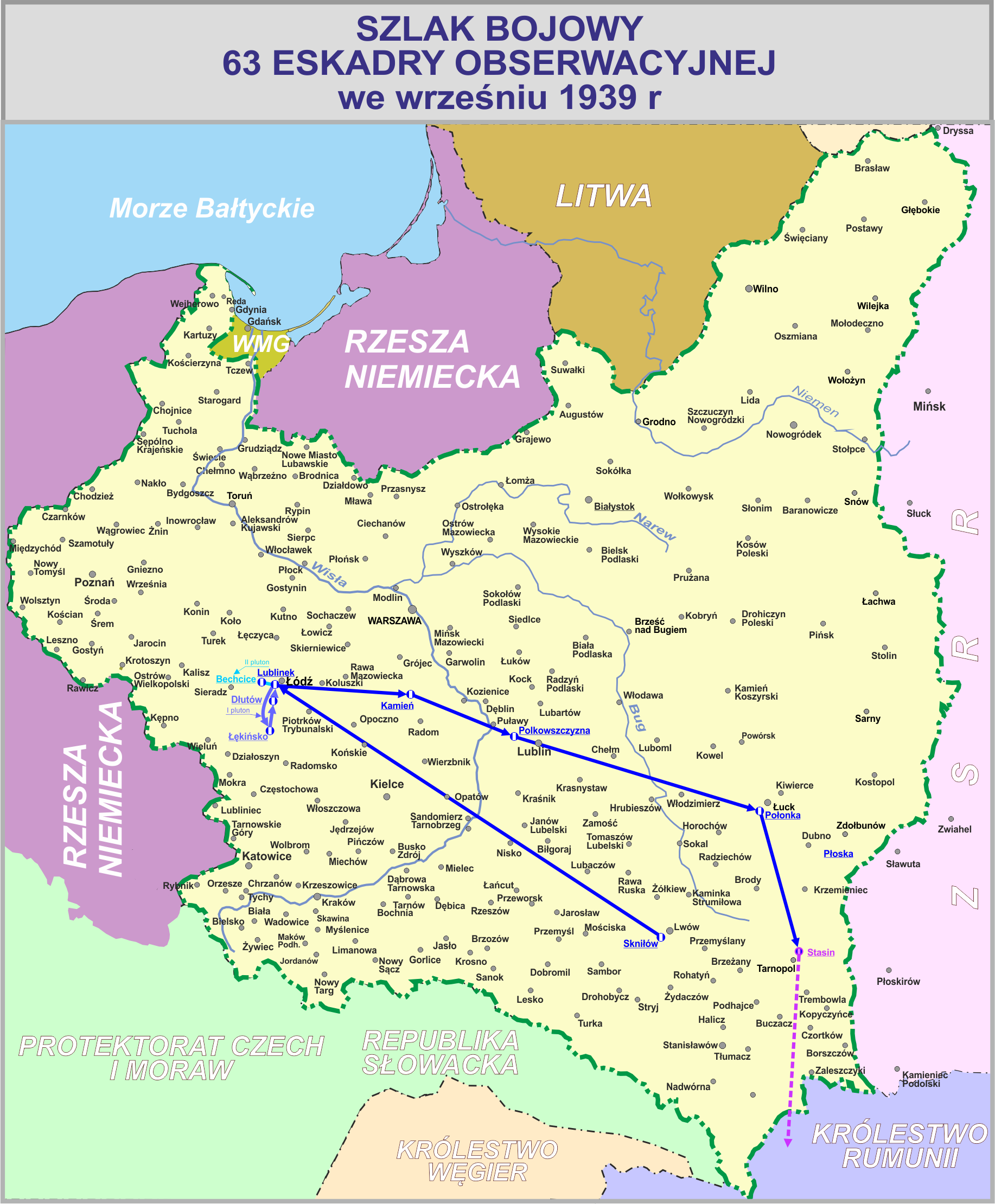

== Air crew ==
commanding officers:

- kpt. obs. Jan Schram (II - X 1934)
- kpt. pil. Kazimierz Wianecki (X 1934 - V 1935)
- kpt. obs. Jan Haręźlak (X 1937 - IX 1939)

== Equipment ==
7 RWD-14b Czapla airplanes and 2 RWD-8.

== See also ==
- Polish Air Force order of battle in 1939
