= RWD 17 =

Polish aerobatics-trainer aircraft of 1937

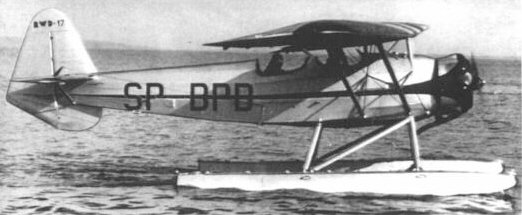
- RWD 17W floatplane prototype

General information
- Type: Trainer aircraft
- Manufacturer: DWL
- Designer: RWD team
- Primary users: Poland Romania
- Number built: ~30

History
- Manufactured: 1938–1939
- Introduction date: 1938
- First flight: 7 August 1937
- Retired: 1939

The RWD 17 was a Polish aerobatics-trainer aircraft of 1937, parasol wing monoplane, constructed by the RWD team.

== Development ==
The aircraft was designed for an order of the LOPP paramilitary organization, as an interim trainer aircraft between primary trainer RWD 8 and single-seater aircraft, demanding higher skills, like the RWD 10. It was also fitted to aerobatics. The construction of the new aircraft was very similar to the RWD 8, but almost all parts were newly designed. Main visual difference were twin struts supporting wings, instead of V-struts, and two-part wing instead of three-part, without central section. The works started in 1936, and the main designer was Bronisław Żurakowski of the RWD bureau. The first prototype (registration SP-BMX) was flown in August 1937 in Warsaw. After state trials in 1937, it was accepted for production, and in 1938 a short series of RWD 17 was produced (23 serial RWD 17 were in the Polish registry).

In early 1938, a floatplane variant RWD 17W was designed, differing among others in a more powerful 160 hp (120 kW) Bramo Sh 14a radial engine. It had interchangeable floats or land undercarriage. When on floats, a bigger tail-fin, extending downwards was mounted. The prototype was flown with a land undercarriage in June 1938, then tested on floats. Next, 5 RWD 17Ws were ordered for the Polish Naval Aviation Squadron (MDLot) at Puck, for use as trainers, built in 1939.

In early 1939 a new wing for the RWD 17 was developed, slightly longer, with thinner profile and narrowing wingtips. It gave better aerobatics capability. Because of problems with its counterpart PWS-35, the Polish Air Force got interested in the modified RWD 17 as a successor of the PWS-26 intermediate trainer; plans to order 50-120 aircraft, with a likely designation RWD 17bis, were not actioned due to the outbreak war.

== Usage ==
RWD 17s were flown by the Polish Aero Club and an aviation school in Świdnik before World War II. During the Invasion of Poland in September 1939, eight of them, including the prototype, were evacuated to Romania. Reportedly, 2 more were evacuated to Latvia. One RWD 17, used by the 56th Observation Escadre as a liaison aircraft, crashed on 12 September 1939.

Apart from the prototype RWD 17W, carrying civilian registration SP-BPB, 5 other RWD 17W floatplanes were produced. Two were commissioned with the Polish Navy just before the outbreak of the war, but they did not get to the Polish Naval Aviation Squadron. The prototype was kept camouflaged in a forest on Hel Peninsula during its siege. On 30 September the aircraft attempted to evacuate to Sweden, however due to engine trouble it crashed in the sea near the peninsula, (the crew was saved). It was the last flight of a Polish aircraft during the Polish September Campaign. Three other RWD 17W, being in a factory in Warsaw, with land undercarriage, were evacuated to Romania (nos. 311, 312, 314), while the remaining two (nos. 313 and 315) were used as liaison aircraft near Warsaw and destroyed thereafter.

In Romania RWD 17s were used until the late 1940s. None returned to Poland after the war, and none have survived.

== Description ==
Mixed construction braced high-wing (parasol wing) monoplane, conventional in layout, single-engine, with open cockpits. The fuselage was made of a steel frame (Cr-Mo), covered with canvas on a wooden frame. Swept rectangular two-part wing, of wooden construction, covered with canvas and plywood in front, two-spar. The wing was supported by a central pyramid and twin struts. Wooden construction braced empennage, covered with plywood (stabilizers) and canvas (rudder and elevators). Crew of two, sitting in tandem, with twin controls and individual windshields. Conventional fixed landing gear, with a rear wheel, or twin floats (RWD 17W).

Initially, the RWD 17 was powered by a PZInż. Major 4 (a licence-built Walter Major 4), de Havilland Gipsy Major, or Cirrus Major (a future option) of 120–150 hp (89–112 kW). The RWD 17W floatplane was powered by a 160 hp (120 kW) Bramo Sh 14a 7-cylinder radial engine.

== Military operators ==
Poland

- Polish Aero Club
- Polish Navy

Romania

- Royal Romanian Air Force

== Specifications (RWD 17) ==
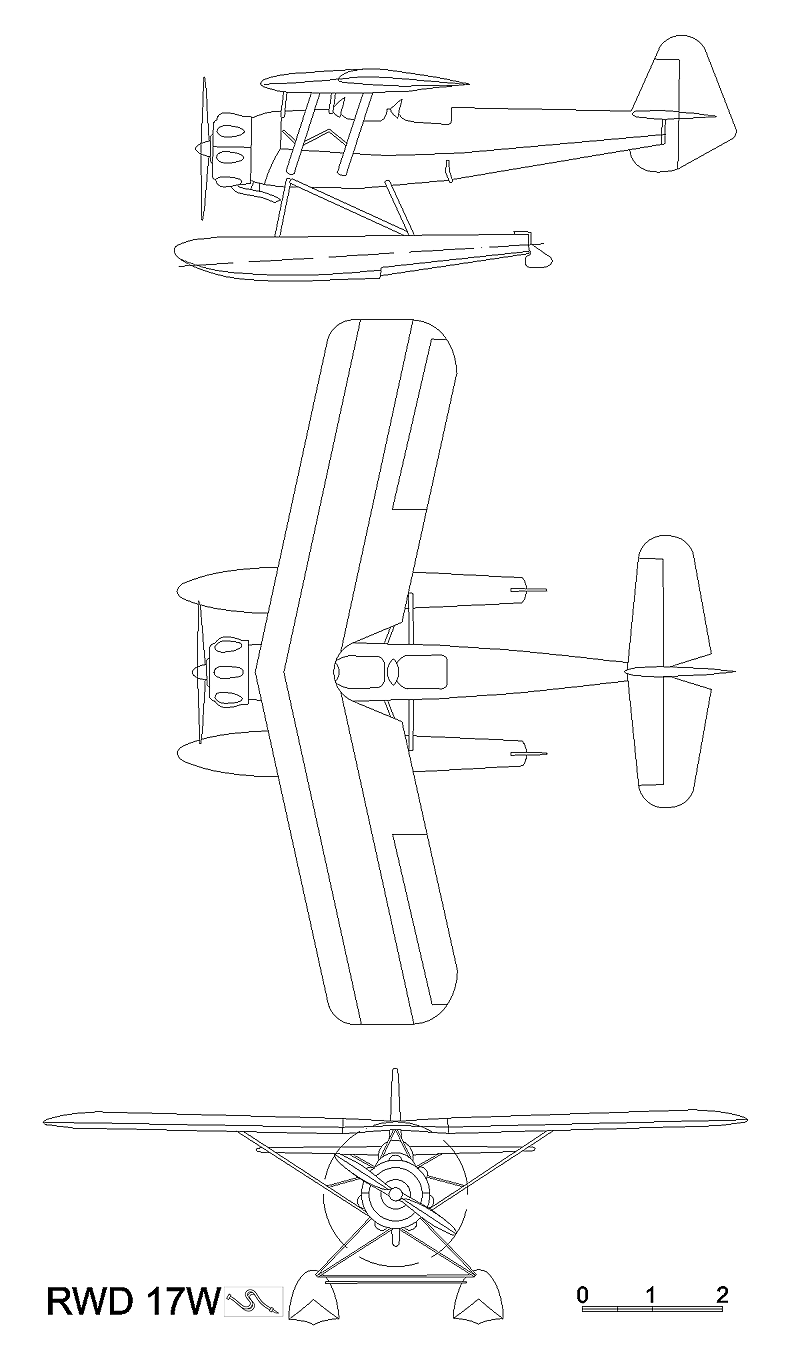

Data from

General characteristics

- Crew: 2 (student and instructor)
- Capacity: 240–290 kg (530–640 lb) useful load
- Length: 7.7 m (25 ft 3 in)
- Wingspan: 10 m (32 ft 10 in)
- Height: 2.45 m (8 ft 0 in)
- Wing area: 18.7 m^{2} (201 sq ft)
- Empty weight: 520 kg (1,146 lb)
- Gross weight: 760 kg (1,676 lb)
- Max takeoff weight: 810 kg (1,786 lb)
- Fuel capacity: 111 L (29 US gal; 24 imp gal)
- Powerplant: 1 × PZInż. Major 4 4-cyl inverted air-cooled piston engine, 97 kW (130 hp)
- Propellers: 2-bladed Szomański fixed pitch wooden propeller

Performance

- Maximum speed: 195 km/h (121 mph, 105 kn)
- Cruise speed: 165 km/h (103 mph, 89 kn)
- Stall speed: 80 km/h (50 mph, 43 kn)
- Range: 680 km (420 mi, 370 nmi)
- Service ceiling: 5,000 m (16,000 ft)
- Rate of climb: 4.5 m/s (890 ft/min)
- Wing loading: 40.5 kg/m^{2} (8.3 lb/sq ft)

== See also ==
Related development

- RWD 8
- RWD 10
