= Naval Air Squadron (Poland) =

- Morski Dywizjon Lotniczy
- Active: 1923-1939
- Country: Poland
- Branch: Air Force
- Role: Reconnaissance for Polish Navy
- Size: 285 soldiers and 31 airplanes
- Equipment: CANT Z.506 Airone; Lublin R-XIII; Lublin R-VIII
- Engagements: Battle of Hel 1939

Naval Air Squadron (in Polish: Morski Dywizjon Lotniczy) was a unit of the Polish Air Force between the two World Wars. The unit was formed in 1920 in Puck. In 1939, it was composed of the Long Range Reconnaissance Escadrille (I Eskadra Dalekiego Rozpoznania) and the Short Range Reconnaissance Escadrille (II Eskadra Bliskiego Rozpoznania)

Puck air base was bombed by Nazi Germany at 5.20am Polish time on Friday September 1. Luftwaffe bombers dropped a projectile on the town, which also had an airbase for the Naval Air Squadron; dealing significant damage to the Polish air force units stationed there.

== History ==
The favourable conditions in Puck (the bay waters and flat coast) were the reason why the German Empire established a Navy research air station at the turn of 1911/1912, and a naval division was established a year later.

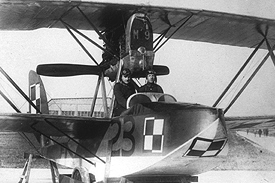
Polish Macchi M.9 in the 1920s.

After Poland regained independence and occupied Puck on 10 February 1920, the area of the former German unit was developed. These included barracks, a take-off area, hangars, a swimming pool for seaplanes and a road for their transfer. Several heavily used seaplanes were also taken over. The area was made available to sailors from the 1st Marine Battalion, who took part in the ceremonial act of Poland's wedding to the sea on 10 February 1920. By order of the commander of the 1st Marine Battalion, an aviation platoon was formed, commanded by Captain Wiktoryn Kaczyński. On May 27, 1920, he was appointed commander of the naval aviation unit and was entrusted with the task of organizing a training squadron.

The first aircraft of the base was a rebuilt FF.33 h seaplane, on which pilot Andrzej Zubrzycki made his first flight on July 15, 1920. In August, two more FF.33 aircraft (in versions e and l) were purchased in Gdańsk, as well as an FF.49 and a Lübeck-Travemünde F4. By the end of 1920, the Hansa-Brandeburg NW and Sablatnig SF-5 seaplanes had also been purchased. The unit's fleet was also reinforced by Fokker D.VII and Albatros B.II land planes

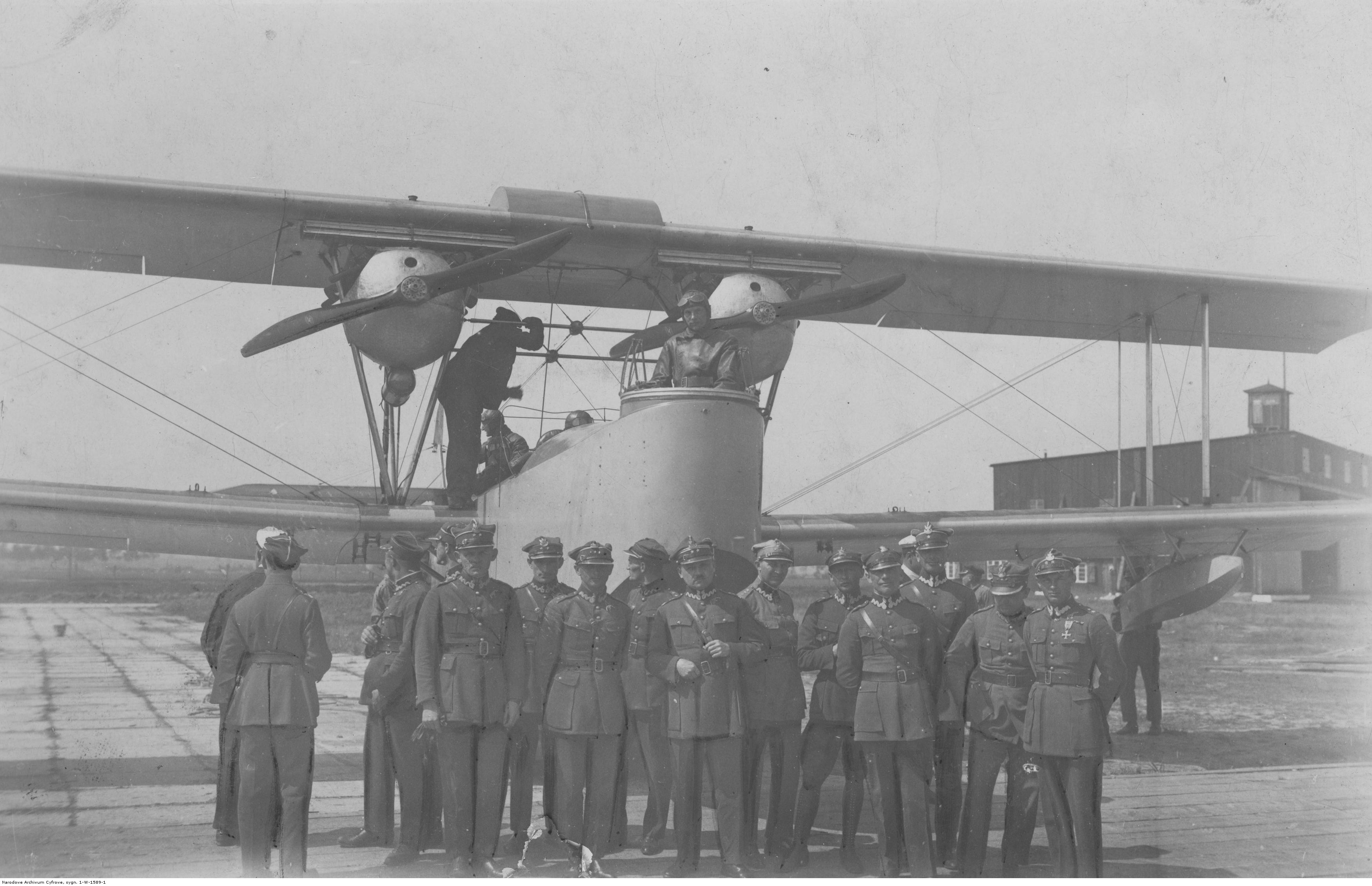
A group of soldiers at the LeO H.135B3 flying boat of the Naval Air Squadron

In the summer of 1921, the Department of Maritime Affairs, through the Polish Purchasing Mission and private companies, purchased 7 FBA S-4 training seaplanes (from 1917) and 9 Nieuport Macchi M 9 reconnaissance planes in Italy. The planes were delivered by sea to Gdańsk on board the Rosa Alba ship. In August, the planes were delivered in parts by rail to Puck.

At the beginning of the 1930's, it was decided to modernize and unify the equipment of the Squadron, focusing on equipment of domestic design. Initially, 4 units of the Lublin R.VIII bis hydro and ter hydro biplane were purchased, as well as the more modern Lublin R.XIII. In 1932, a prototype and 3 units in the R-XIII bis/hydro version were made, by mid-1934 another 10 units in the R-XIII ter/hydro version with metal floats were delivered. A year later, the third series of R-XIII G was delivered, consisting of 6 aircraft, differing in the double rudder, metal adjustable propellers and other minor changes in use. 5 units of Bartel BM-5 training aircraft were also purchased.

On December 9, 1932, the Squadron was incorporated into the Polish Navy.

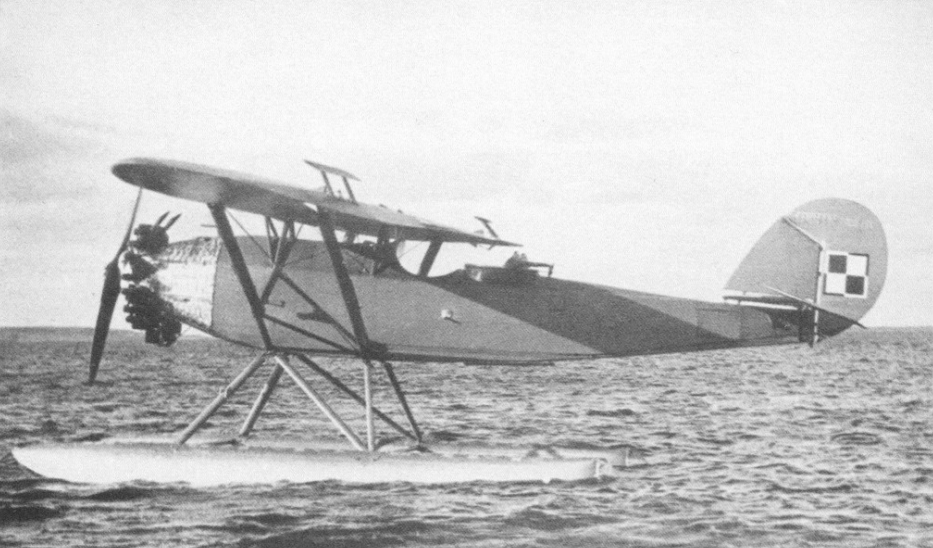
Lublin R.XIII bis/hydro

In 1934, the composition of the Naval Air Squadron was as follows:

- 1st Line Squadron
- 2nd Line Squadron
- 4th Training Squadron
- Staff Platoon
- River Air Squadron

The Naval Air Squadron lacked the 3rd torpedo squadron. Tests of the Lublin R-XX prototype aircraft, as well as the LWS-5 and RWD-22 aircraft projects did not meet the requirements. It was decided to purchase modern torpedo seaplanes abroad. The Italian CANT Z.506 B seaplane was selected, and on July 30, 1938, an agreement was signed for the delivery of 6 aircraft. Only one of these aircraft reached Poland, which flew on August 27, 1939 from Italy to Puck, via Yugoslavia, Hungary, and Slovakia.

On August 1, 1939, the squadron had 31 aircraft, which were part of the training, reconnaissance, and line squadrons, and an accompanying platoon. Several cutters and the target ship ORP "Ślązak" were also in service.

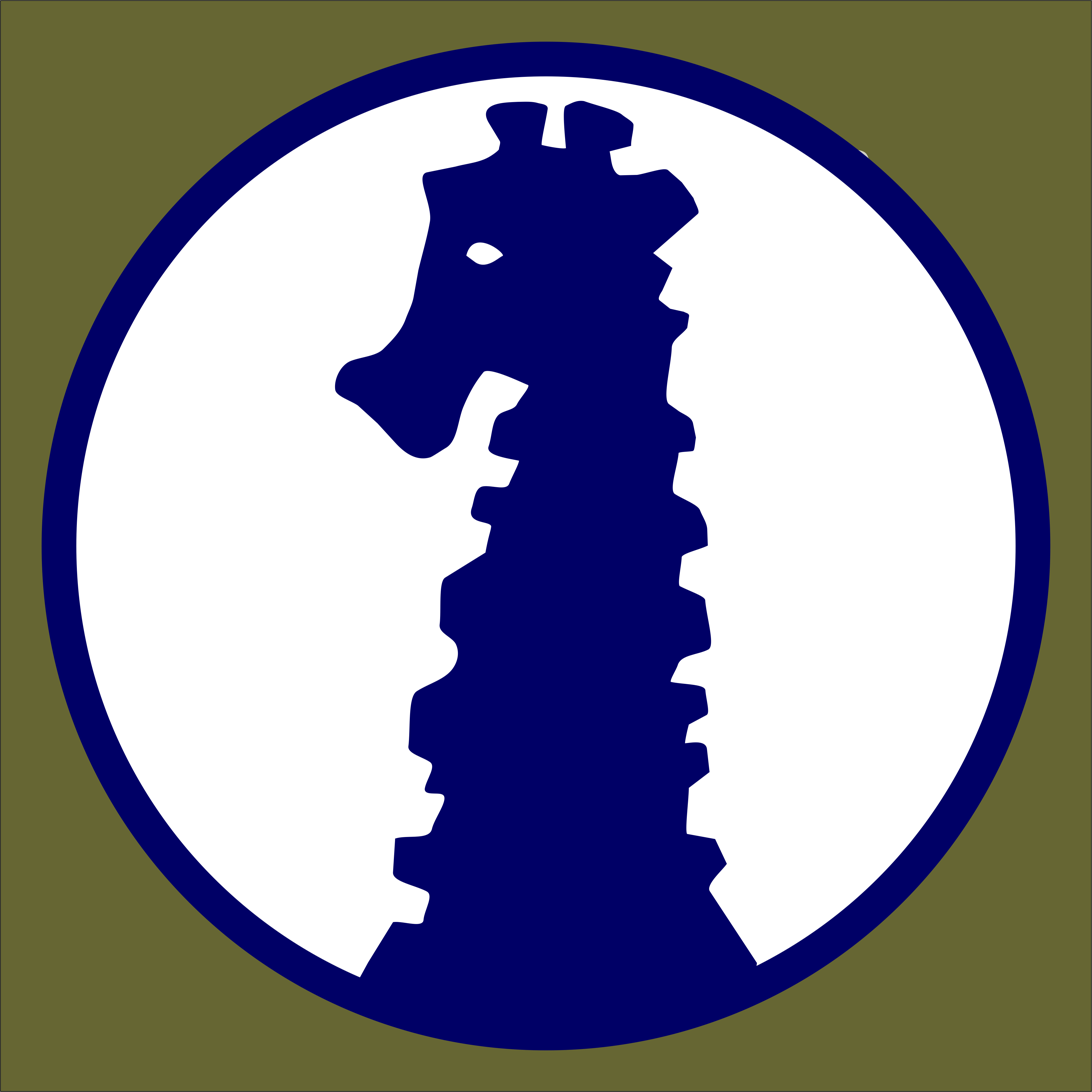
The symbol painted on the planes of the 1st Long-Distance Reconnaissance Squadron

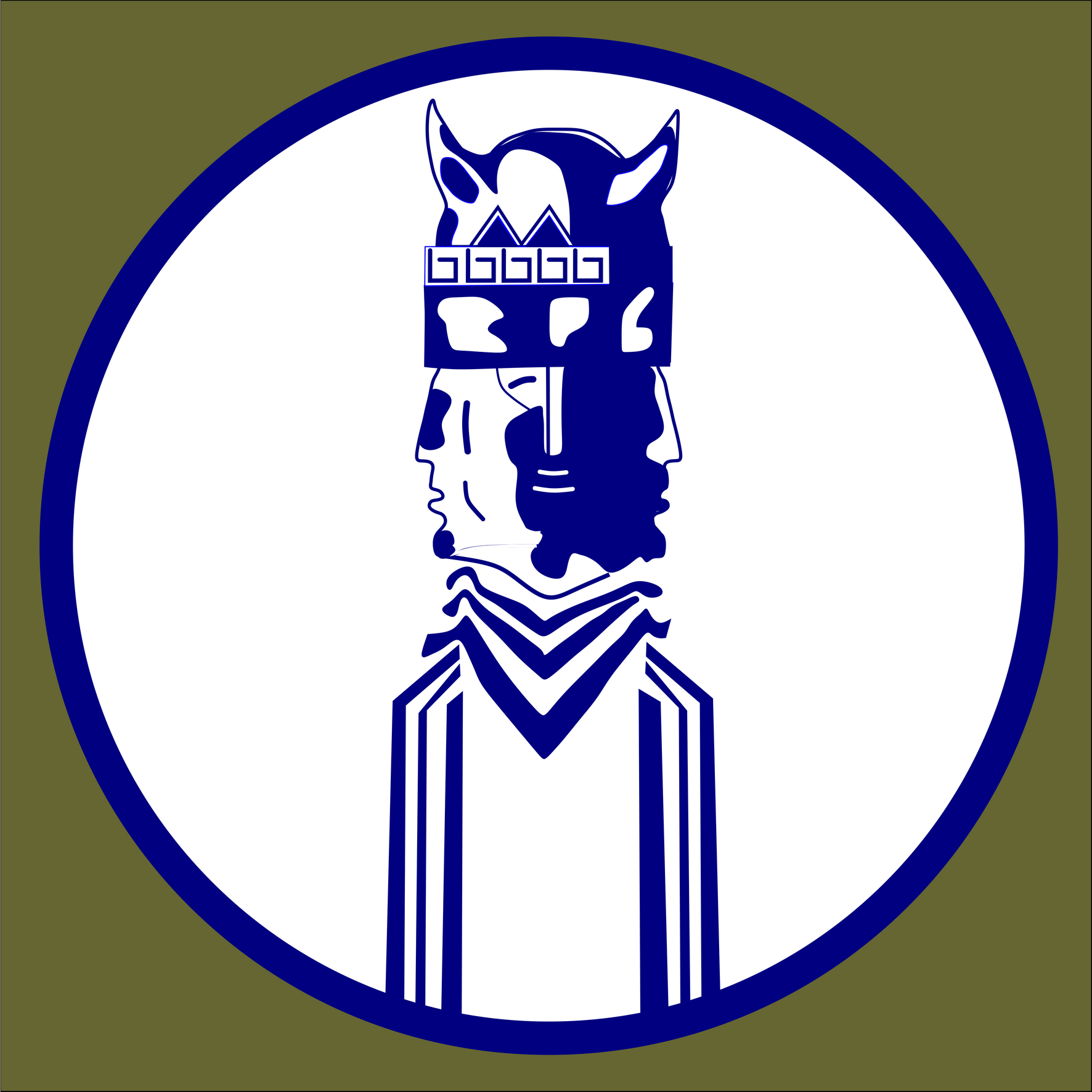
The symbol painted on the planes of the 2nd Close Reconnaissance Squadron

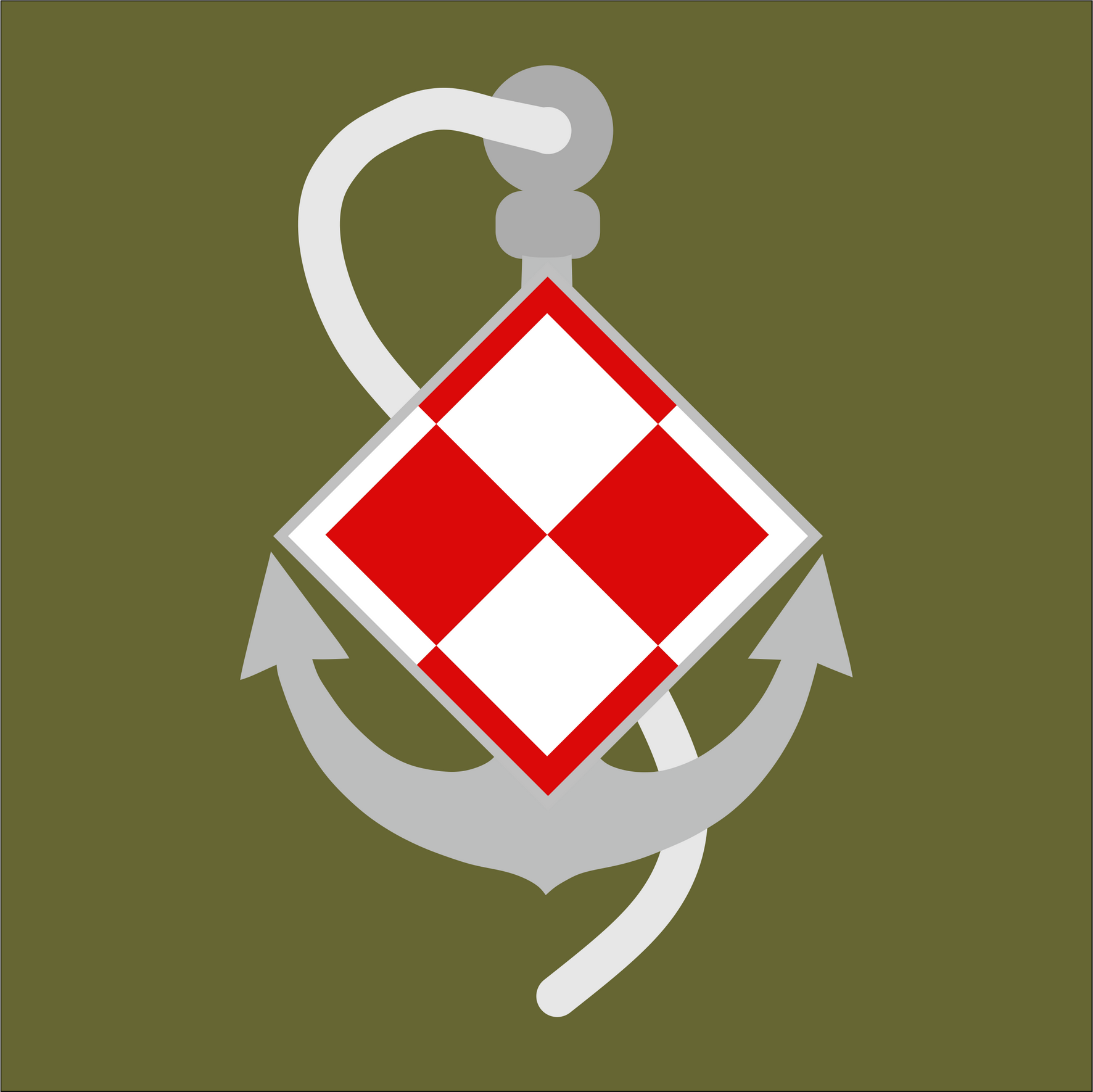
The symbol painted on the planes of the river air squadron

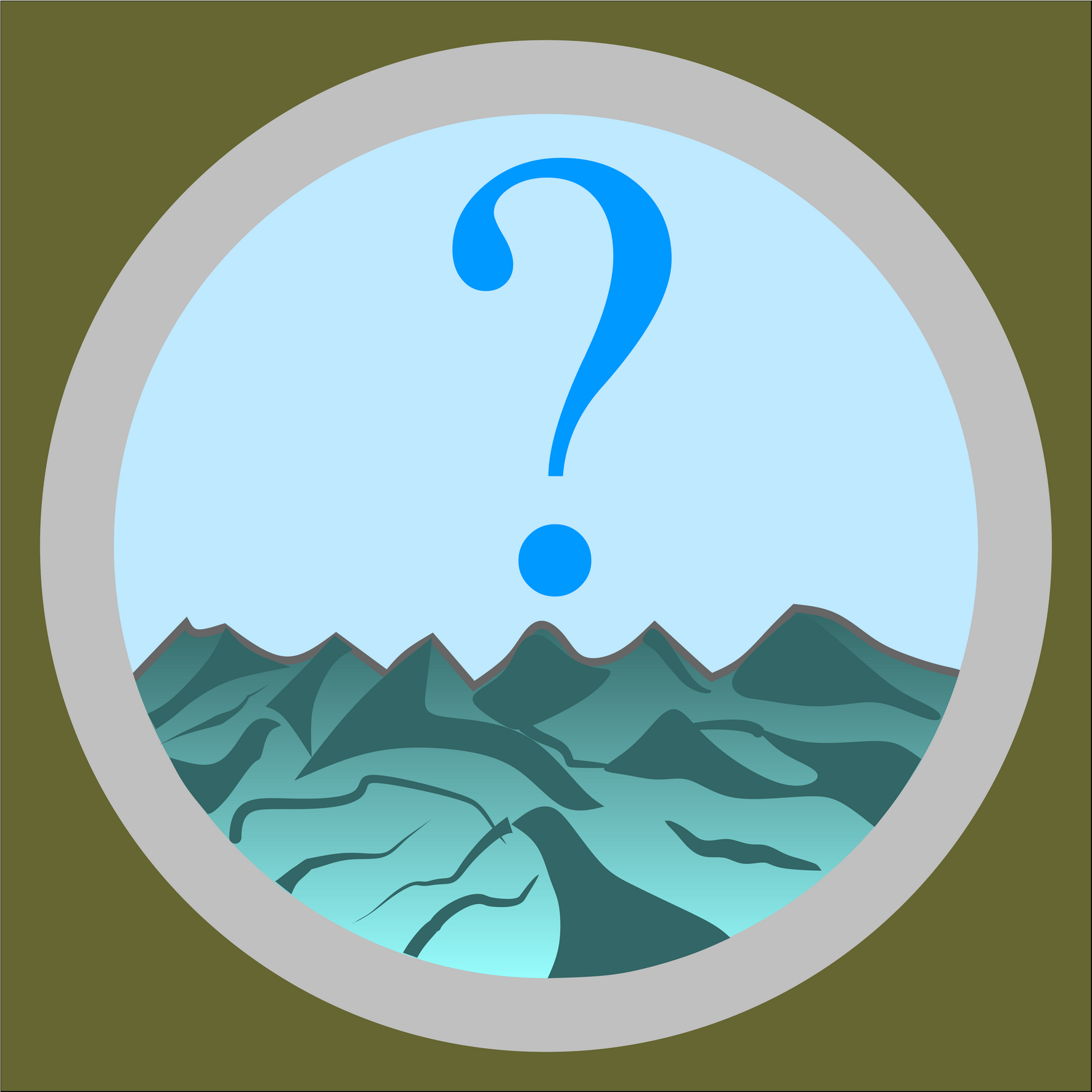
The symbol painted on the aircraft of the training squadron of the division

== Squadron in defense of the Coast in September 1939 ==
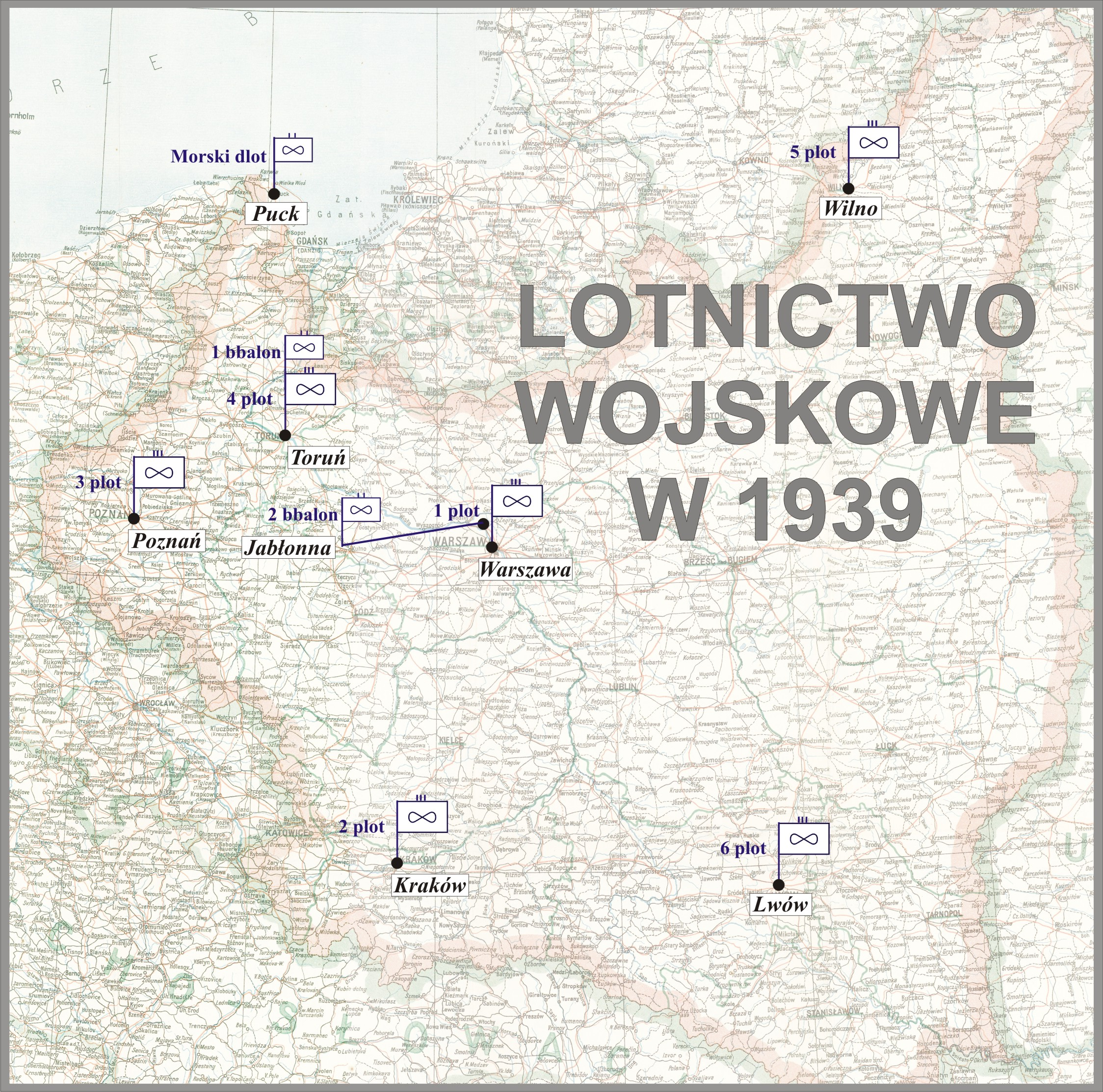
Polish Air Force bases in 1939

On September 1st at around 6:00 a.m. twenty Heinkel He 111 aircraft bombed the squadron base in Puck, destroying barracks and an ammunition depot, among other things. During the raid, the commander, Commander Edward Szystowski, and three non-commissioned officers and privates were killed. German pilots reported the destruction of a dozen or so seaplanes, but none of the Polish seaplanes were destroyed or damaged. After the raid, the seaplanes, people and equipment were ordered to be evacuated to the Squadron's war base in Jurata. The seaplanes were then anchored in the Bay of Puck at the shore of the Hel Peninsula, at large intervals, where they were not camouflaged, however.

On September 2nd, the crew of the CANT Z.506B seaplane, consisting of: Capt. Mar. Pilot Roman Borowiec, Senior BSM Pilot T. Benetkiewicz, BSM Mech. F. Grzesiak, Lt. Mar. K. Wilkanowicz, bsm. J. Kulakowski flew to the Lublin region – to Lake Siemień near Parczew, with a stopover on the Vistula near Kozienice. On September 9, 1939, the seaplane was damaged there, and on September 11, destroyed by German aircraft.

The new commander of the Squadron, Cdr. 2nd Lt. pilot Kazimierz Szalewicz, proposed using the seaplanes for reconnaissance purposes or bombing the battleship "Schleswig-Holstein" shelling Westerplatte, but the fleet commander did not accept this and they remained without combat tasks (light bombs of 12.5 kg could not pose a serious threat to the battleship). During repeated air raids by German seaplanes on 3 September, most of the Polish aircraft were damaged by machine gun fire and only one operational Lublin R-XIII G no. 714 remained. On 6 September, the crew of this seaplane consisting of Lieutenant Mar. Pilot Józef Rudzki and Lieutenant Pilot Observer Zdzisław Juszczakiewicz performed a night flight to reconnaissance the Bay of Gdańsk.

On 7 September at about 9:00 p.m., the crew of the Lublin R-XIII G no. 714 seaplane consisting of Lieutenant Mar. Pilot Józef Rudzki and Lieutenant Pilot Observer Zdzisław Juszczakiewicz took off with 75 kg bombs with the task of locating and bombing the battleship "Schleswig-Holstein", however, the ship was not found. During the flight over Gdańsk, Lieutenant Rudzki bombed, and Lieutenant Juszczakiewicz fired machine guns at, the German population celebrating the capture of the Military Transit Depot on Westerplatte at a night victory parade. However, there is no confirmation of such an air raid against civilian targets in German sources. On the return flight, a second German battleship, the "Schlesien", was observed near Gdynia. After completing the mission, the crew splashed down in Jurata.

The next day, on the morning of September 8, a German seaplane raid damaged or destroyed all Polish seaplanes anchored in the area of Jurata, Kuźnica and Chałupy, with the exception of the RWD-17W hidden in the forest. Due to the impossibility of repair, the damaged seaplanes were then sunk after removing their machine guns. The Naval Air Squadron was disbanded and its personnel took part in land combat as part of the previously formed 1st and 2nd Companies and the Anti-Airborne Unit.

On September 30, two officers attempted to reach Sweden by RWD-17W seaplane, but the plane crashed 15 km from the Polish coast due to engine failure (the crew survived).
