= Polish 46th Observation Escadrille =

The 46th Observation Escadrille was a unit of the Polish Air Force at the beginning of the Second World War. The unit was attached to the Pomorze Army.

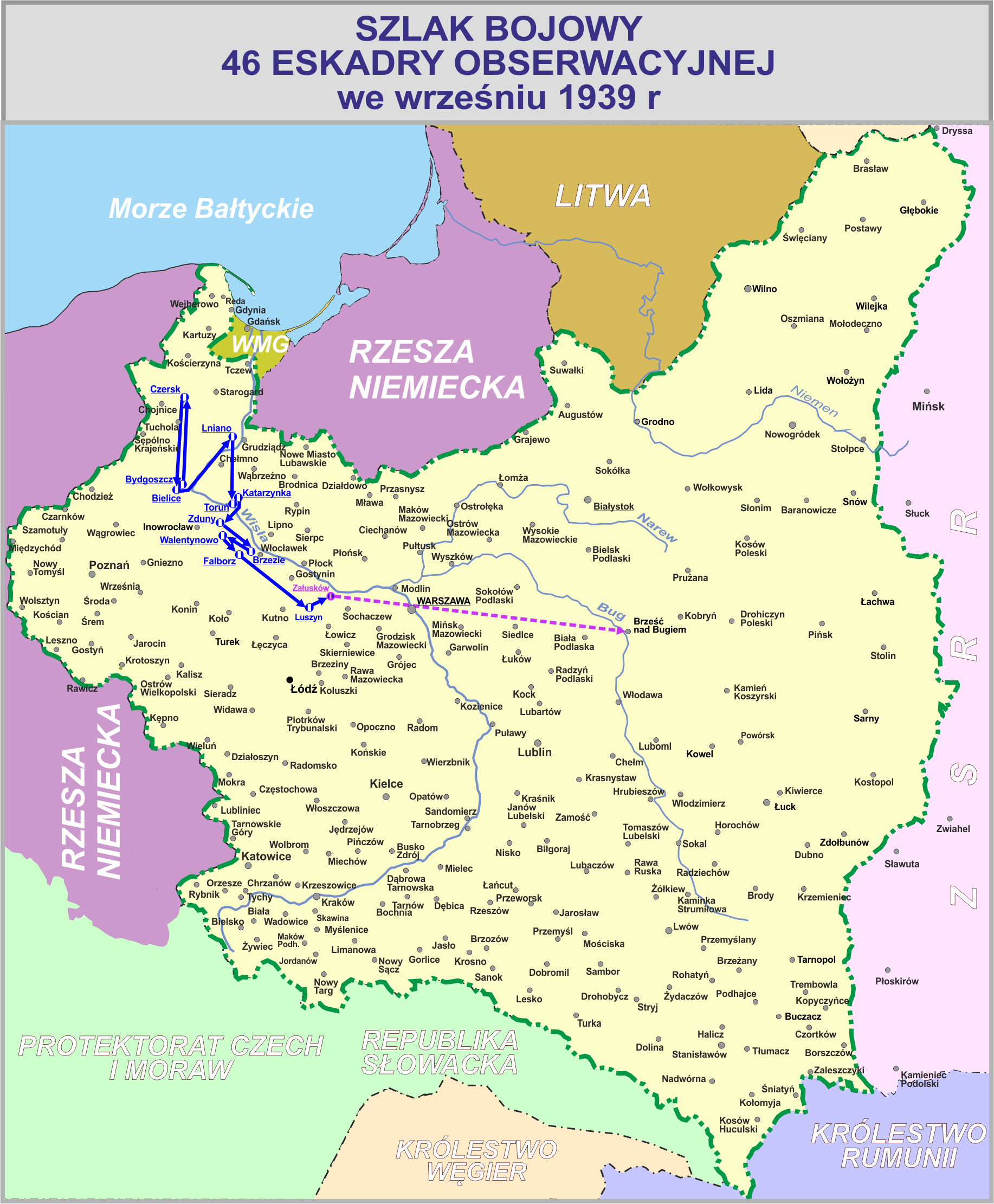

== Air crew ==
Commanding officer: kpt. pil. Roman Rypson.

== Equipment ==
7 Lublin R-XIIID and Lublin R-XIIIC airplanes and 2 RWD-8.

== See also ==
- Polish Air Force order of battle in 1939
