= Polish 26th Observation Escadrille =

The 26th Observation Escadrille was a unit of the Polish Air Force at the beginning of the Second World War. The unit was attached to the Kraków Army.

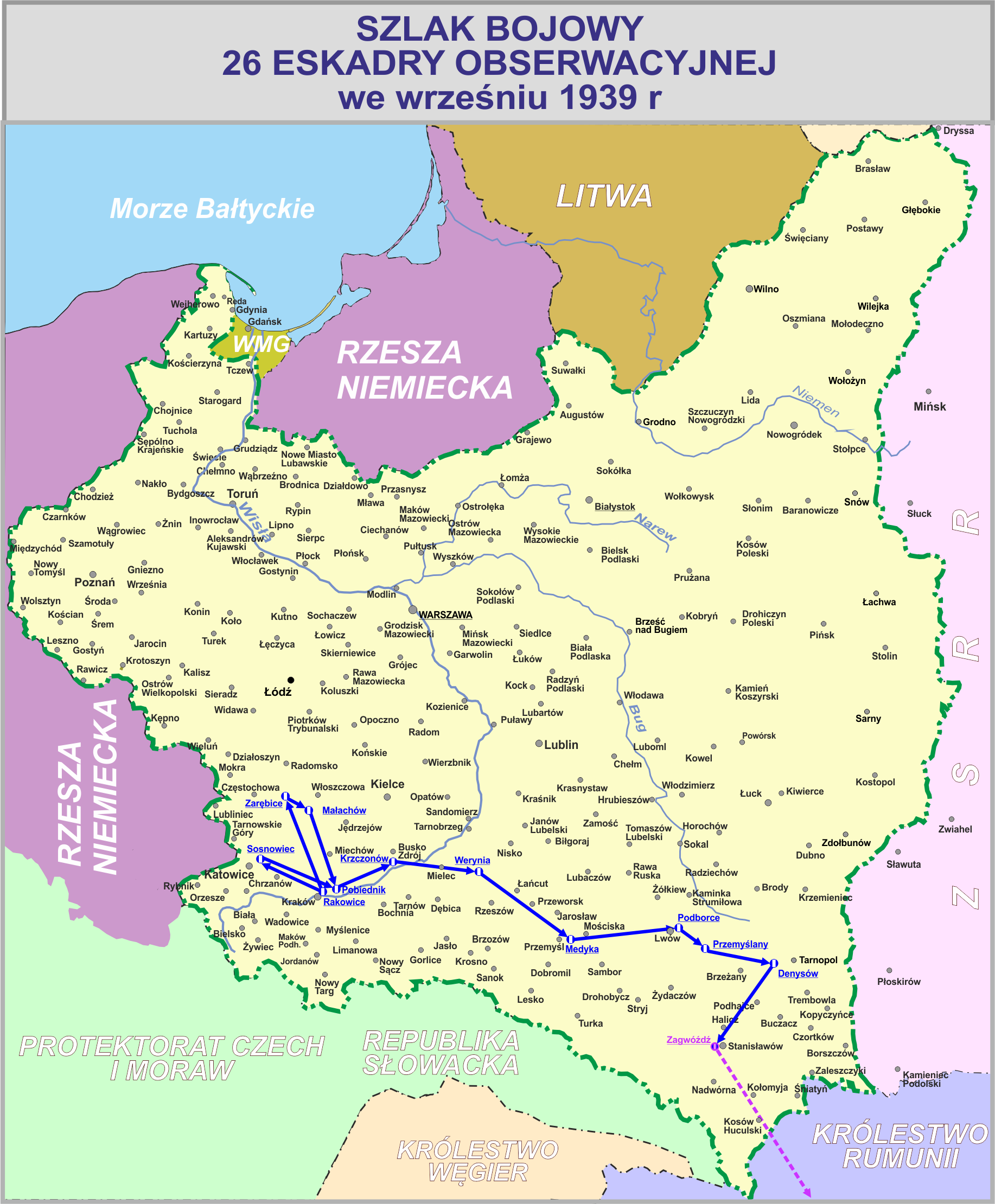

== Air crew ==
Commanding officer: kpt. obs. Stanisław Rzepa.

== Equipment ==
7 Lublin R-XIIID airplanes and 2 RWD-8.

== See also ==
- Polish Air Force order of battle in 1939
