= Polish 42nd Reconnaissance Escadrille =

- Polish: 42 Eskadra Rozpoznawcza
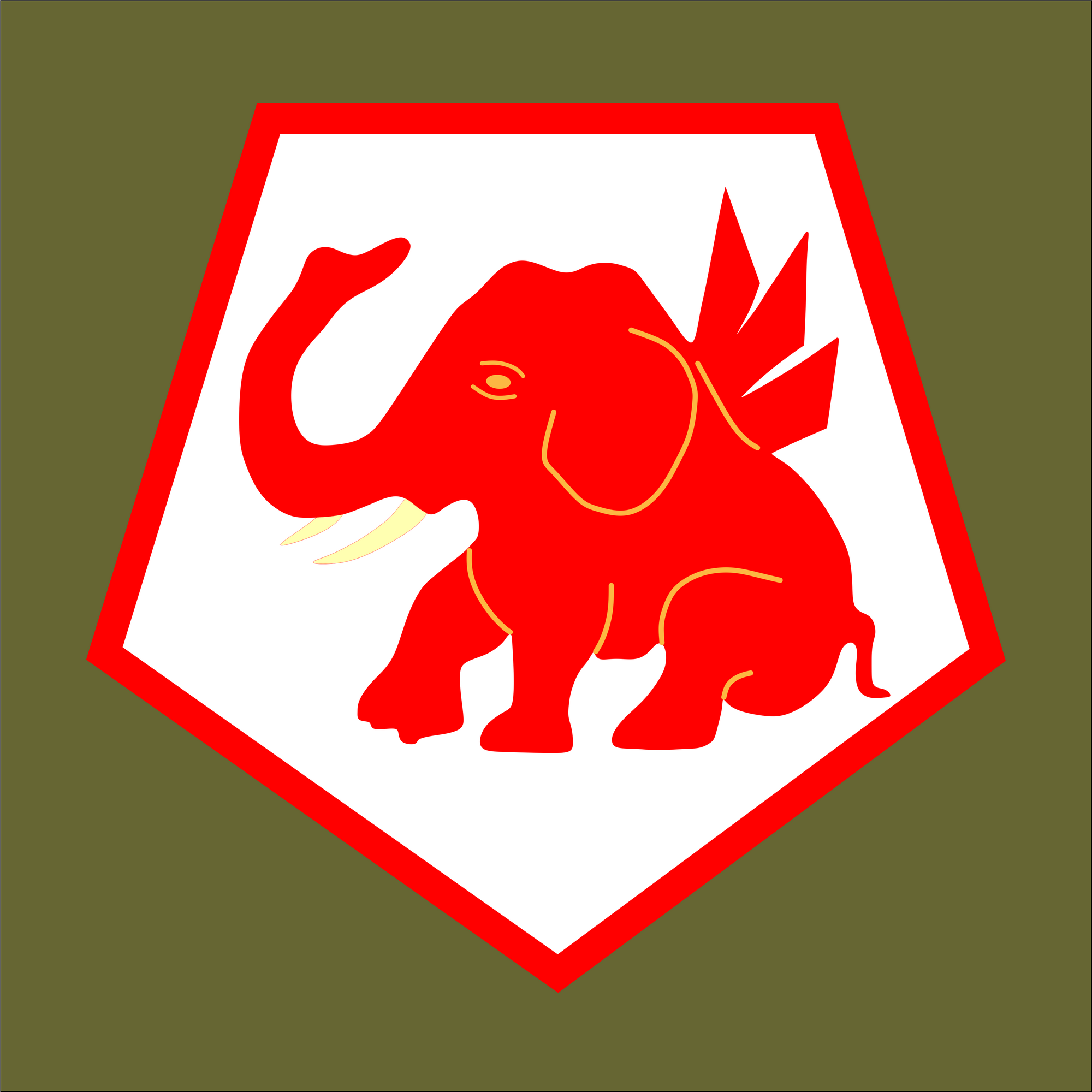
- Unit Insignia of the 42nd Reconnaissance Escadrille
- Active: 1924 – September 1939
- Disbanded: September 1939
- Country: Poland
- Allegiance: Second Polish Republic
- Branch: Polish Land Forces
- Type: Air force
- Part of: Pomorze Army
- Engagements: World War II

Commanders
- Notable commanders: Czesław Aleksandrowicz (first); Wacław Waltera (last)

Aircraft flown
- Reconnaissance: PZL.23 Karaś
- Trainer: RWD 8

The 42nd Reconnaissance Escadrille (Polish: 42 Eskadra Rozpoznawcza) was a unit of the Polish Air Force active at the onset of World War II. It was assigned to the Pomorze Army, and played a role in aerial reconnaissance during the Invasion of Poland in 1939.

== History ==
The squadron was initially formed in 1924, and was originally named the 42nd Reconnaissance Squadron. It was initially assigned used and outdated aircraft, such as the Ansaldo A.300 and the Breguet 14. The squadron was renamed into the 42nd Air Reconnaissance Squadron, and received several Potez XV trainer aircraft in the same year, allowing it to partake in regular pilot exercises. In 1928, part of the squadron undertook exercises with the 15th Infantry Division.

The number of aircraft in the squadron increased to 10 aircraft following the reorganization of the Polish air force in 1929. The unit was also renamed to the 42nd Line Squadron. During the summer of 1930, the squadron's crew participated in exercises with the "Toruń" Cavalry Brigade. In 1931, the outdated Potez 27 aircraft were gradually replaced with Breguet 19 aircraft.

In the summer of 1936, the squadron participated in an air parade in Warsaw. During the subsequent inter-divisional exercises in Pomerania, the squadron achieved good results while cooperating with the staff command of major units participating in the exercise.

Due to the planned replacement of the squadron's older planes with PZL.23B Karaś aircraft, the squadron's observers and mechanics completed a course in the operation and maintenance of these aircraft.

The aircraft were replaced by the end of 1937. In March 1938, the crew of the squadron flew on alert to the Lida airbase. After Polish-Lithuanian diplomatic relations were restored later in the same month, the crew returned to Toruń on 23 March 1938.

=== World War II ===
In September 1939, the unit was attached to the Pomorze Army. At 8:00 a.m. on 1 September, the squadron commander received orders to send three reconnaissance aircraft to Zdun, while the rest were to remain in Toruń. At 9:00 a.m., the aircraft took off to carry out their missions.

== Aircraft ==
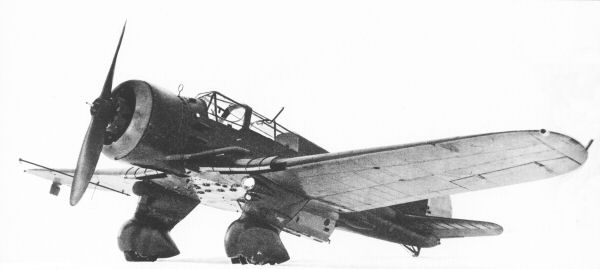
PZL.23B Karaś

=== Aircraft used in 1939 ===
- 10 PZL.23B Karaś
- 1 RWD-8

== Personnel ==
Squadron personnel in 1939
Personnel of the squadron command
Rank	Role	Name
Captain	Squadron commander	Wacław Alfred Waltera
Captain	Tactical officer	Wiktor Szumbarski
Technical warrant officer	Technical officer	Antoni Chruszczyński
Second lieutenant of the medical corps	Squadron doctor	Alfons Olejnik
Senior military foreman	Chief mechanic	Michał Schmidt
Platoon-leader	Chief administrator	Stanisław Burczyk
Squadron personnel
Rank	Role	Name
Lieutenant	Pilot	Mieczysław Lewandowski
Lieutenant	Pilot	Romuald Suliński
Sergeant	Pilot	Władysław Żołnowski
Corporal	Pilot	Wacław Banaszuk
Corporal	Pilot	Edward Hajdukiewicz
Corporal	Pilot	Mieczysław Ligęza
Corporal	Pilot	Konrad Muchowski
Corporal	Pilot	Zbigniew Perkowski
Corporal	Pilot	Paweł Przybylak
Corporal	Pilot	Aleksander Sowiński
Corporal	Pilot	Ludwik Steinke
Corporal	Pilot	Stefan Wojciechowski
Lieutenant	Air observer	Mieczysław Daab
Lieutenant	Air observer	Julian Palka
Lieutenant	Air observer	Stanisław Starowicz
Second lieutenant	Air observer	Witold Bukowski
Second lieutenant	Air observer	Mieczysław Kretowicz
Second lieutenant	Air observer	Zygmunt Mazurkiewicz
Second lieutenant	Air observer	Henryk Olearczyk
Officer cadet	Air observer	Kazimierz Borowski
Officer cadet	Air observer	Bohdan Makowski
Officer cadet	Air observer	Włodzimierz Pfleger
Officer cadet	Air observer	Witold Siuda
Officer cadet	Air observer	Włodzimierz Danielewicz
Corporal officer cadet	Air observer	Zdzisław Śliwowski
Corporal officer cadet	Air observer	Jan Wilczyński
Corporal	Air gunner	Tadeusz Aranowski
Corporal	Air gunner	Jerzy Fontain
Corporal	Air gunner	Kazimierz Frąckiewicz
Corporal	Air gunner	Antoni Jasiński
Corporal	Air gunner	Mieczysław Kieres
Corporal	Air gunner	Marian Manasiak
Corporal	Air gunner	Helmut Słotowski
Corporal	Air gunner	Bronisław Więckowski
Senior private	Air gunner	Stanisław Pęczak
Senior private	Air gunner	Wacław Tracz

== See also ==
- Polish Air Force order of battle in 1939
