= Polish 23rd Observation Escadrille =

The 23rd Observation Escadrille was a unit of the Polish Air Force at the beginning of the Second World War. The unit was attached to the Kraków Army.

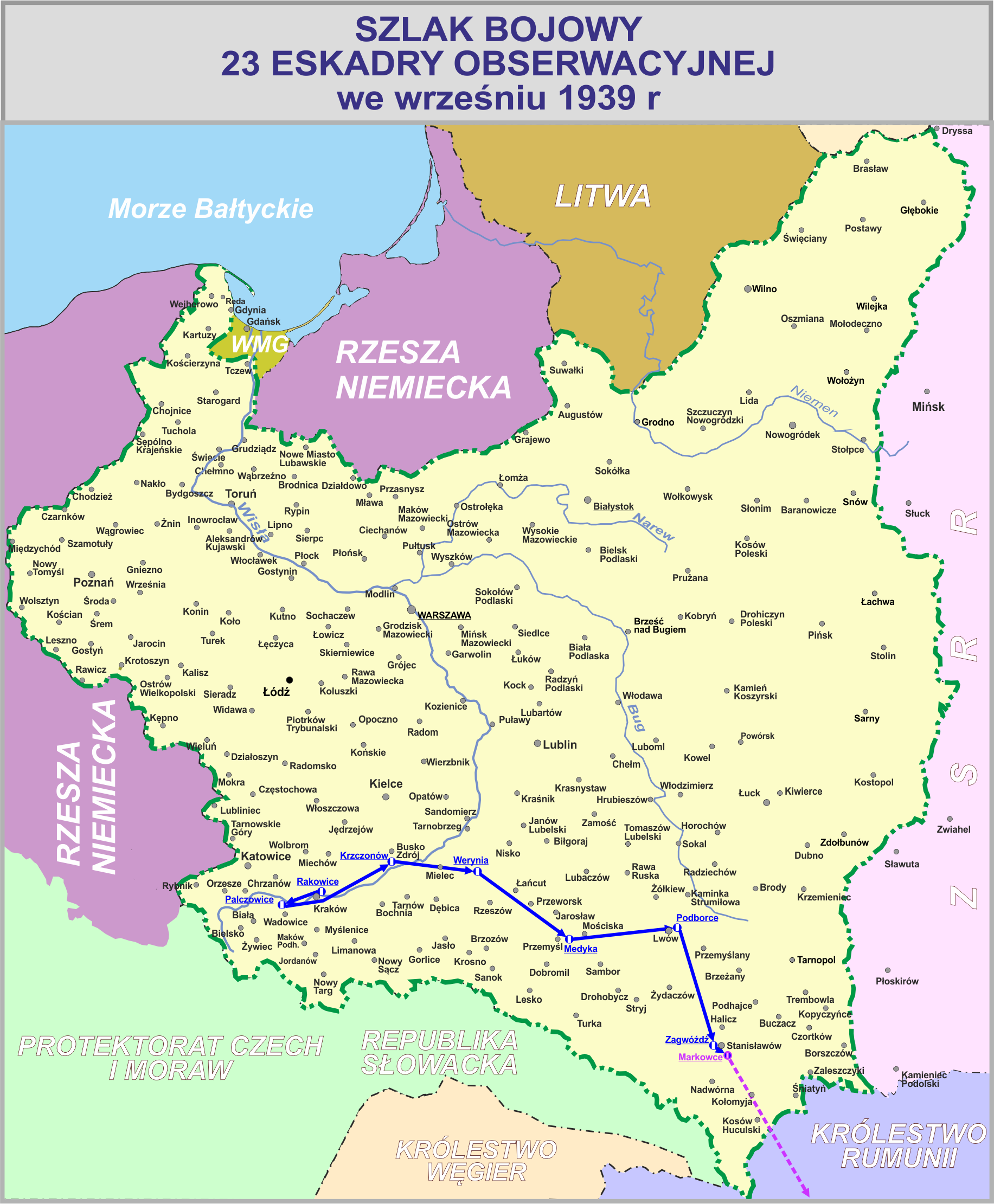

== Air crew ==
Commanding officer: por. obs. Władysław Rewakowicz.

== Equipment ==
7 RWD-14b Czapla airplanes and 2 RWD-8.

== See also ==
- Polish Air Force order of battle in 1939
