= Polish 16th Observation Escadrille =

The 16th Observation Escadrille was a unit of the Polish Air Force at the beginning of the Second World War. The unit was under direct command of the Polish HQ.

== Air crew ==
Commanding officer: kpt. obs. Eugeniusz Lech.

== Equipment ==
7 Lublin R-XIIID airplanes and 2 RWD-8.

== See also ==
- Polish Air Force order of battle in 1939
