= Short Range Reconnaissance Escadrille =

Short Range Reconnaissance Escadrille (Eskadra Bliskiego Rozpoznania) was a unit of the Polish Naval Air Squadron (Morski Dywizjon Lotniczy) at the beginning of world war 2.

== Air Crew ==
Commander: kpt. mar. obs. Marian Janczewski

== Equipment ==
10 Lublin R-XIIIter and Lublin R-XIIIG floatplanes.

== See also ==
- Polish Air Force order of battle in 1939
