= Polish 132nd Fighter Escadrille =

Former fighter unit in Poland

The 132nd Fighter Escadrille of the Polish Air Force (Polish: 132. Eskadra Myśliwska) was one of the fighter units of the Polish Army in 1939. It was attached to the Army Poznań. Along with the 131st Fighter Escadrille it created III/3 Fighter Squadron.

== History ==
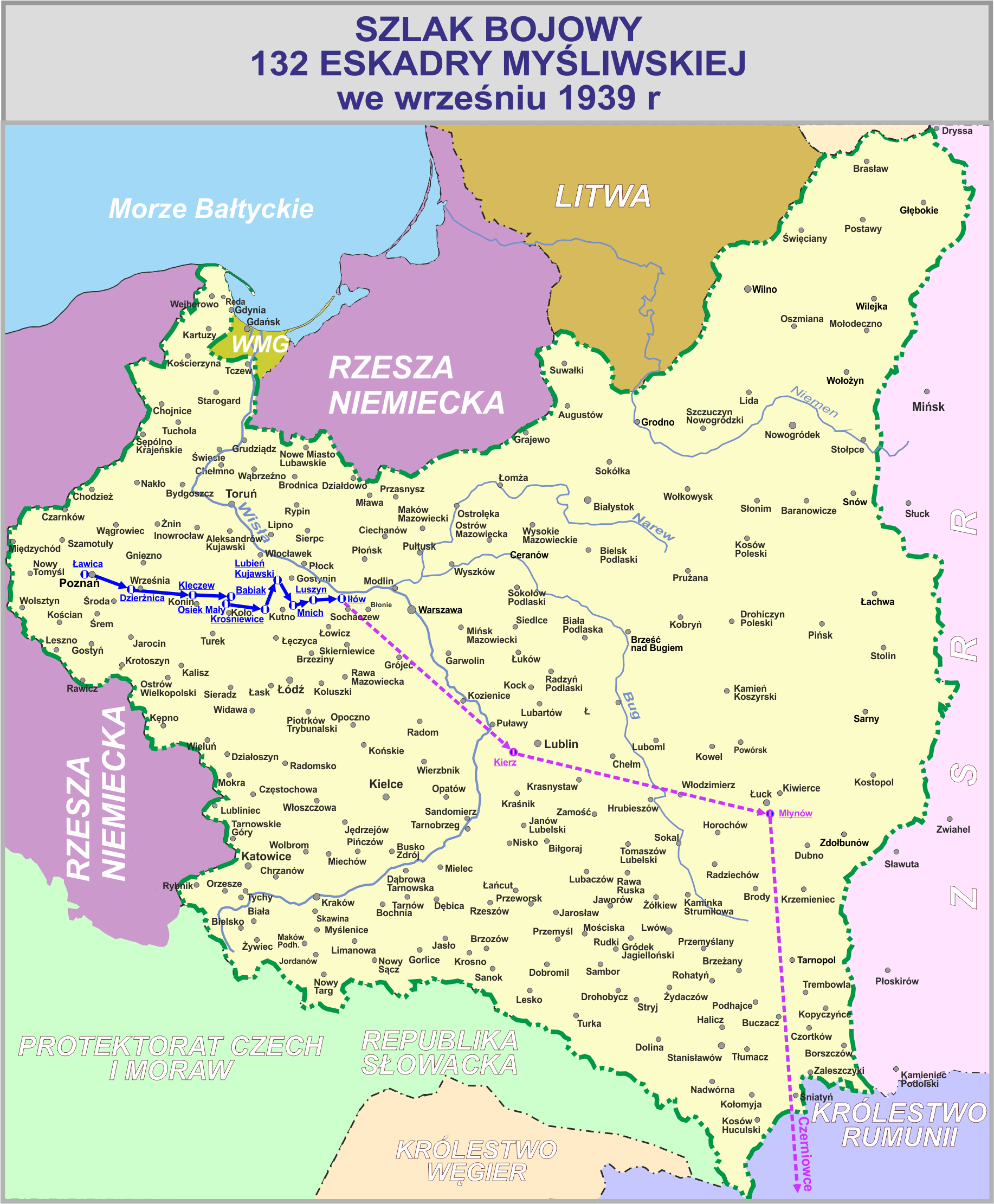

The unit was formed in 1928 by renaming an earlier fighter unit.

== Crew and equipment ==
PZL P.11c

On 1 September 1939 the escadrille had 10 PZL P.11c airplanes.

The air crew consisted of: commanding officer kpt. pil. Franciszek Jastrzębski his deputy ppor. pil. Henryk Bibrowicz

Pilots:

1. ppor. Józef Czachowski (reserve)
2. ppor. Mikołaj Kostecki
3. ppor. Jerzy Łazowski (reserve)
4. ppor. Paweł Łuczyński
5. pchor. Bohdan Anders
6. pchor. Witold Jaroszka
7. pchor. Jan Maliński
8. pchor. Kazimierz Olewiński
9. pchor. Jan Pudelewicz
10. pchor. Stefan Wapniarek
11. kpr. Włodzimierz Chojnacki
12. kpr. Wawrzyniec Jasiński
13. kpr. Władysław Kuik
14. kpr. Kazimierz Mazur
15. kpr. Bronisław Raszewski
16. kpr. Leon Skarbecki

== See also ==
- Polish Air Force order of battle in 1939
