= Long Range Reconnaissance Escadrille =

Long Range Reconnaissance Escadrille (Eskadry Dalekiego Rozpoznania) was a unit of the Naval Air Squadron (Polish Morski Dywizjon Lotniczy) at the beginning of world war 2.

== Air Crew ==
Commander: kpt. mar. pil. Roman Borowiec

== Equipment ==
2 Lublin R-VIIIter floatplanes and 1 CANT Z.506B

== See also ==
- Polish Air Force order of battle in 1939
