= Acme Aircraft Corporation =

American aircraft manufacturer

- Company type: Privately held company
- Industry: Aerospace
- Founded: 1928
- Defunct: by 1931
- Headquarters: Rockford, Illinois, United States
- Key people: President: R.S. Link; General Manager: P.H. Ryan
- Products: Light aircraft

The Acme Aircraft Corporation was an American aircraft manufacturer based in Rockford, Illinois, founded in 1928.

The company president was R.S. Link and the general manager was P.H. Ryan.

== Products ==
The company was established to produce biplane sport aircraft in the 90 hp (67 kW) range. The company built one Acme Biplane and also produced the parasol wing Acme Sportsman. The Sportsman was designed by Edward A. Stalker, the head of the Department of Aeronautical Engineering at the University of Michigan. Only two of that model were completed before the company went out of business by 1931, in the Great Depression.

== Aircraft ==
Summary of aircraft built by Acme Aircraft Corporation
Model name	First flight	Number built	Type
Acme Biplane	1928	1	Biplane sport aircraft
Acme Sportsman	2 October 1929	2	Parasol wing sport aircraft
