= Polish 142nd Fighter Escadrille =

142. Fighter Escadrille was a unit of the Polish Air Force at the start of the Second World War. The unit was attached to the Pomorze Army.

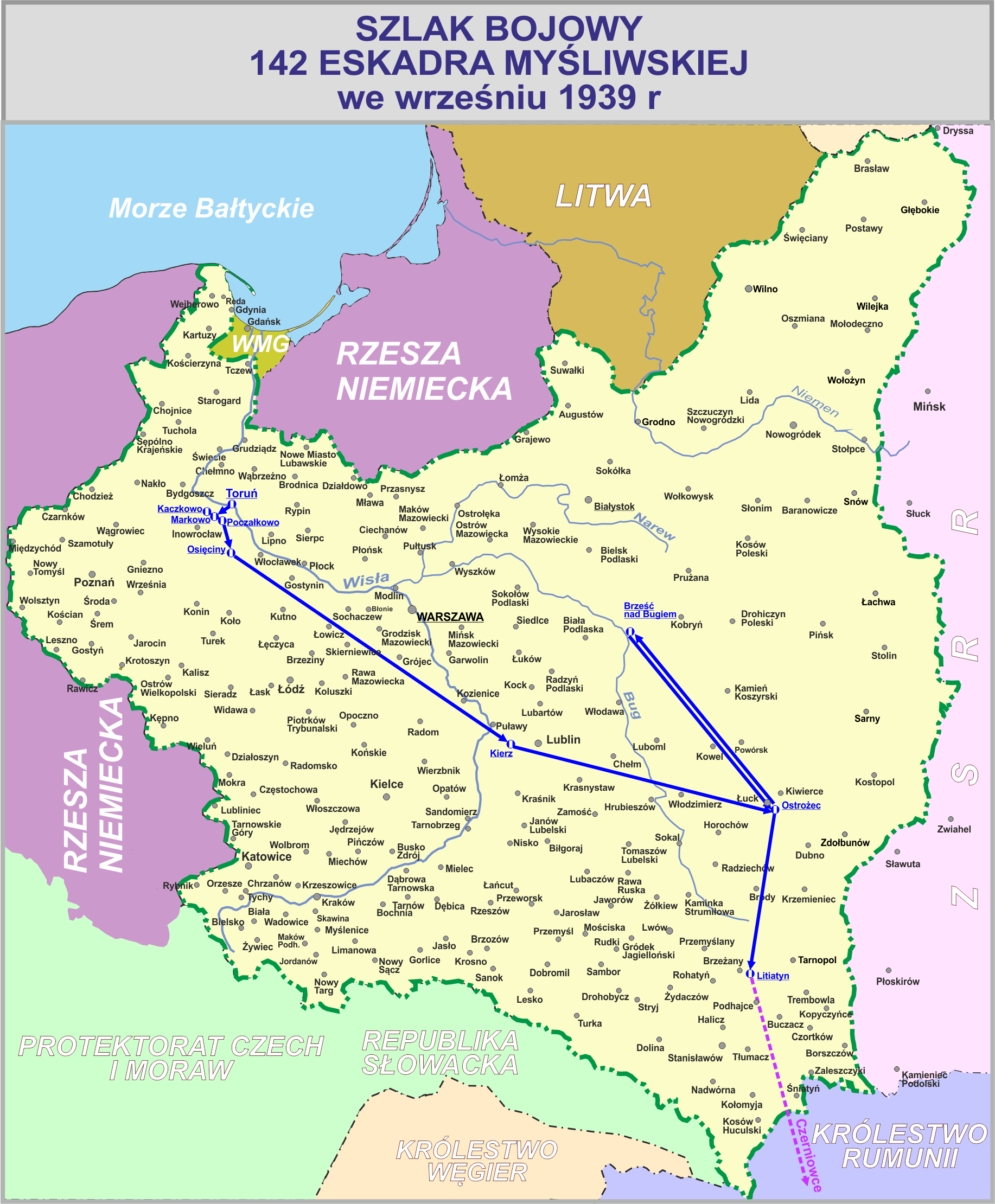

== Equipment ==
PZL P.11c

10 PZL P.11c airplanes.

== Air Crew ==
Commanding officer: kpt. pil. Mirosław Leśniewski
Deputy Commander: por. Wacław Wilczewski

Pilots

1. por. Jerzy Słoński-Ostoja
2. por. rez. Stanisław Zieliński
3. ppor. Jan Czapiewski
4. ppor. Stanisław Skalski
5. ppor. Paweł Zenker
6. pchor. Leon Jaugsch
7. pchor. Stanisław Kogut
8. pchor. Karol Pniak
9. kpr. Zygmunt Klein
10. kpr. Antoni Łysek
11. kpr. Jan Śmigielski
12. kpr. Ludwik Weywer
13. kpr. Stanisław Wieprzkowicz
14. kpr. Mirosław Wojciechowski
15. st. szer. Winicjusz Barański
16. st. szer. Leon Kosmowski
17. st. szer. Zenon Kowalski
18. st. szer. Leon Spindel

== See also ==
- Polish Air Force order of battle in 1939
