= Polish 152nd Fighter Escadrille =

Polish Air Force unit during Second World War

The 152. Fighter Escadrille was a unit of the Polish Air Force at the start of the Second World War. In 1939 the unit was attached to the Modlin Army.

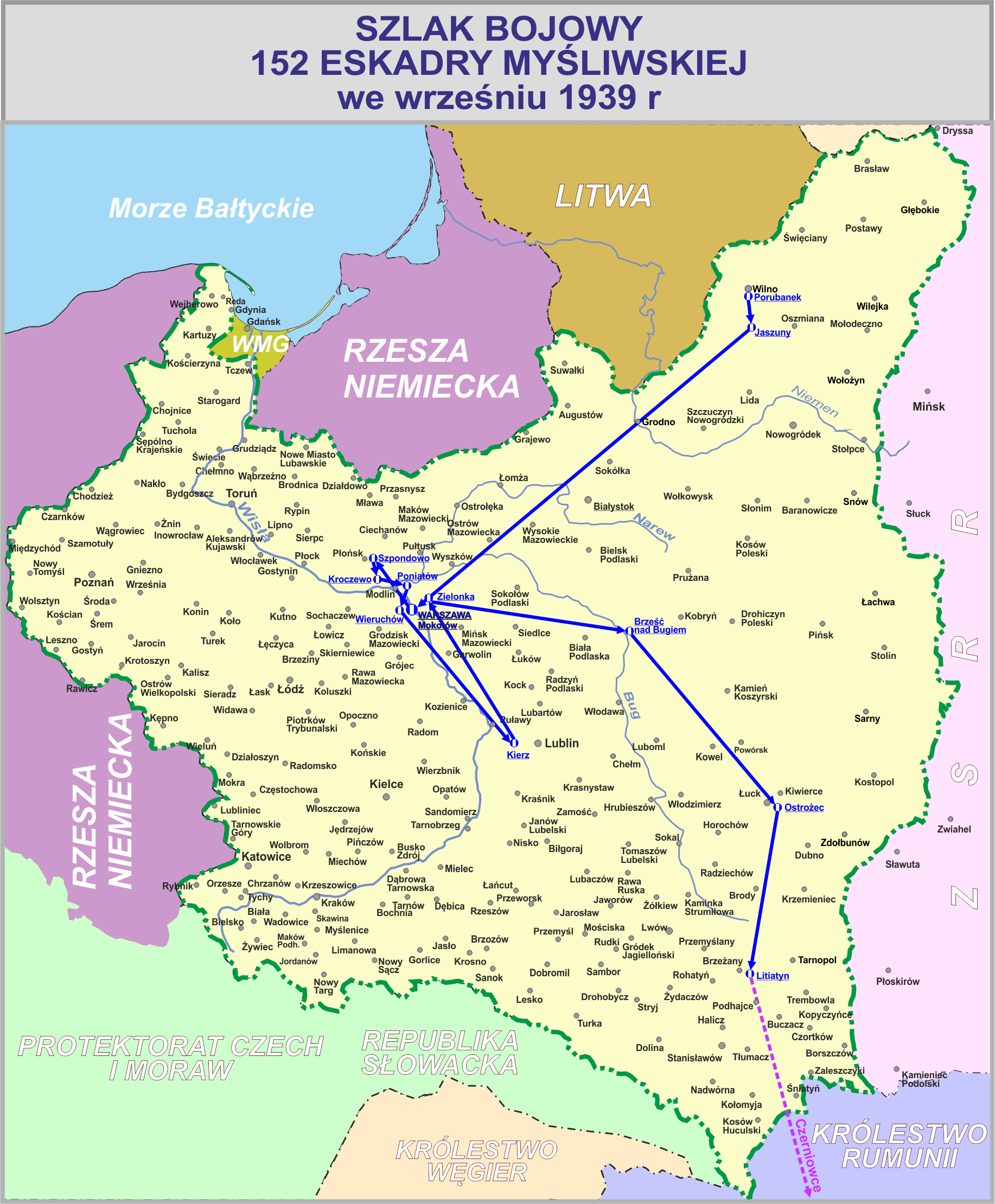

== Equipment ==
9 PZL P.11c and 1 PZL P.11a airplanes.

== Air Crew ==
Commanding officer: kpt. pil. Włodzimierz Łazoryk

Deputy Commander: por.pil.Marian Imiela

Pilots:

1. ppor.pil.Jan Bury-Burzymski
2. ppor.pil.Anatol Piotrowski
3. pchor.pil.Mieczysław Babiański
4. pchor.pil.Stanisław Kędzierski
5. pchor.pil.Mieczysław Waszkiewicz
6. plut.pil.Marian Bełc
7. kpr.pil.Stanisław Brzeski
8. kpr.pil.Antoni Joda
9. kpr.pil.Aleksander Popławski
10. st.szer.pil.Mieczysław Popek

== See also ==
- Polish Air Force order of battle in 1939
