= Polish 131st Fighter Escadrille =

History of my life

131. Fighter Escadrille was a unit of the Polish Air Force at the start of the Second World War. The unit was attached to the Poznań Army. Along with the 132nd Fighter Escadrille it created III/3 Fighter Squadron.

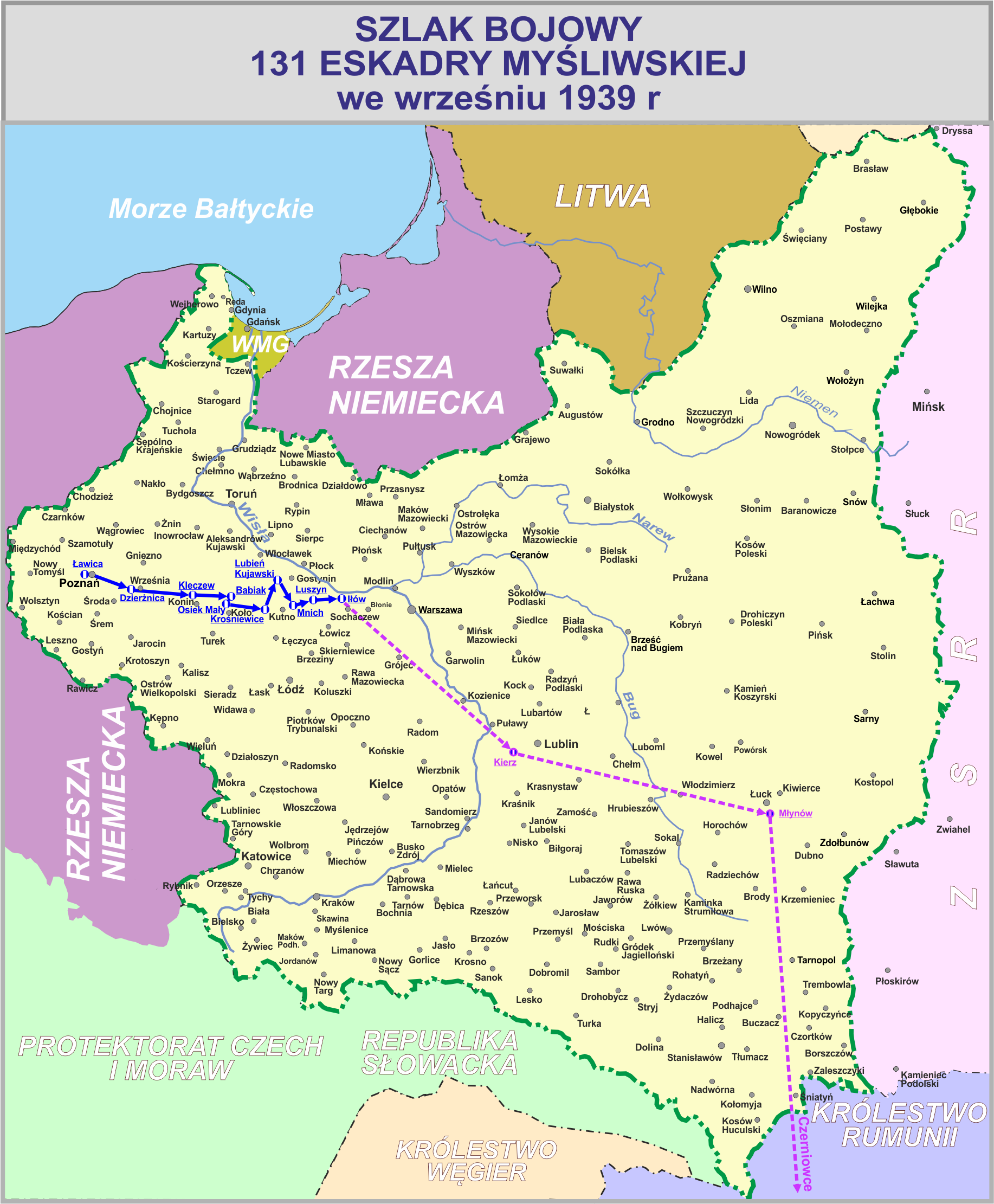

== Equipment ==
PZL P.11c

10 PZL P.11c airplanes.

== Air Crew ==
Commanding officer: kpt. pil. Jerzy Zaremba Deputy Commander: por. pil. Zbigniew Moszyński

Pilots:

1. ppor. Włodzimierz Gedymin
2. ppor. Lech Grzybowski
3. ppor. Zbigniew Rowiński (reserve)
4. ppor. Aleksander Wróblewski (reserve)
5. pchor. Alfons Kabat
6. pchor. Florian Kortus
7. pchor. Mirosław Nowak
8. pchor. Jerzy Salski
9. kpr. pchor. rez. Bolesław Rychlicki
10. kpr. Tomasz Gabryel
11. kpr. Brunon Kroczyński
12. kpr. Stanisław Matuszak
13. kpr. Romuald Żerkowski

== See also ==
- Polish Air Force order of battle in 1939
