= Polish 43rd Observation Escadrille =

The 43rd Observation Escadrille was a unit of the Polish Air Force at the beginning of the Second World War. The unit was attached to the Pomorze Army.

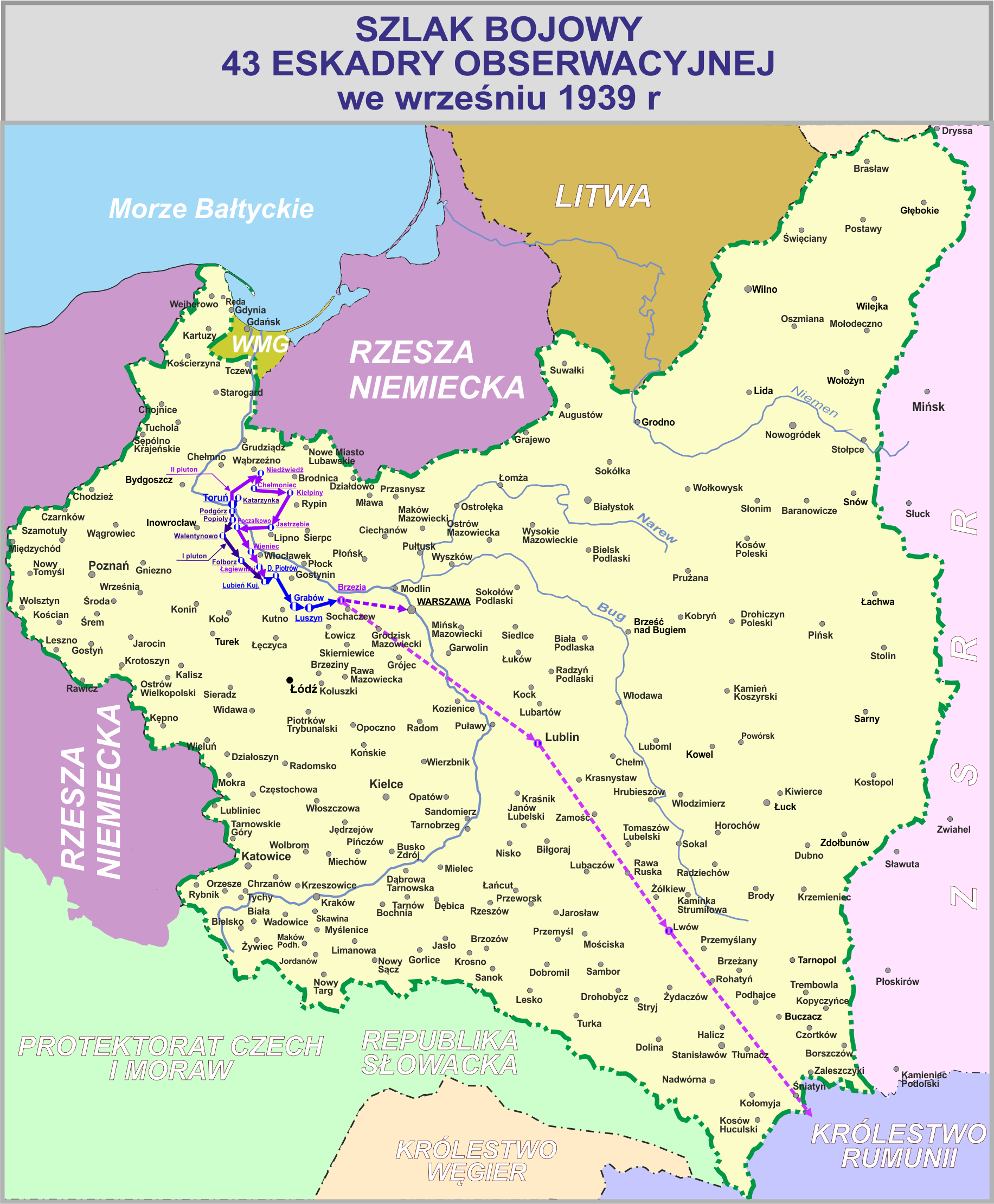

== Air crew ==
Commanding officer: kpt. obs. Władysław Dawidek.

== Equipment ==
7 Lublin R-XIIID airplanes and 2 RWD-8.

== See also ==
- Polish Air Force order of battle in 1939
