= Marian Bełc =

Polish fighter ace

Marian Bełc DSO DFC**
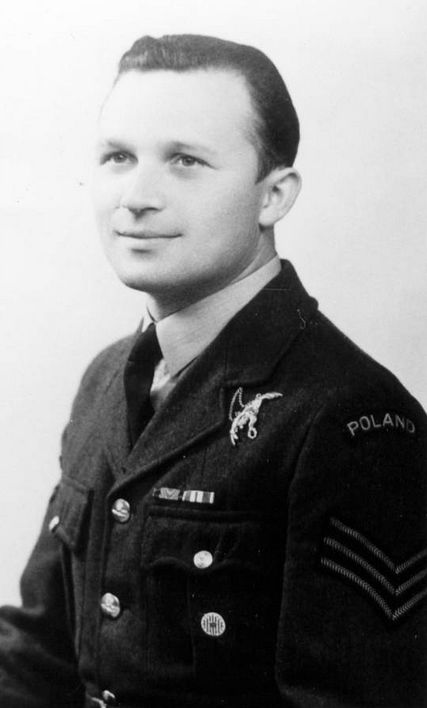
- Born: 27 January 1914; Paplin Russian Empire (present-day Poland)
- Died: 27 August 1942 (aged 28); RAF Babdown Farm, England
- Military career
- Allegiance: Poland; France; United Kingdom
- Branch: Polish Air Force; France Armée de l'Air; Royal Air Force
- Service years: 1934-1942
- Rank: podporucznik
- Service number: P-1901
- Units: Polish 143rd Fighter Escadrille; Polish 152nd Fighter Escadrille; No. 303 Polish Fighter Squadron
- Conflicts: Polish Defensive War, World War II
- Awards: Virtuti Militari; Cross of Valour; Distinguished Flying Cross (UK)

Marian Bełc DFC (27 January 1914 – 27 August 1942) was a Polish fighter ace of the Polish Air Force in World War II with 7 confirmed kills and one shared.

== Biography ==
Marian Bełc graduated from pilot training at Lublinek air base near Łódź. On 2 November 1934 he was assigned to the 143rd Fighter Escadrille in Toruń. In autumn 1937 he was transferred to the Polish 152nd Fighter Escadrille in Wilno. During the Invasion of Poland Bełc shot down his first plane, on 3 September a Bf 109. After the Soviet invasion of Poland he was evacuated to France via Romania. He served in the Krasnodębski section of the Groupe de Chasse et de Défense I/55 under the command of Zdzisław Krasnodębski. In the same unit served two other Polish aces: Jan Zumbach and Stanisław Karubin. After the capitulation of France he came to the UK. All pilots of the Krasnodębski section were posted 2 August 1940 to the No. 303 Polish Fighter Squadron. In the Battle of Britain Bełc downed 6 German planes.

On 15 April 1941 married Audrey Stephenson, their son Marian Edward was born on 27 October 1941.

In 1942 Bełc became an instructor in 58 OTU. On 27 August 1942, in a training flight with a British pilot their plane crash-landed. Both pilots were killed. Bełc is laid to rest at Northwood Cemetery in Grave 267, Section H.

== Aerial victory credits ==
- Bf 109 - 3 September 1939
- 1/8 Do 215 - 18 September 1940
- Bf 109 - 26 September 1940
- Bf 110 - 5 October 1940
- Bf 109 - 7 October 1940
- Bf 109 - 24 June 1941
- Bf 109 - 28 June 1941
- Bf 109 - 24 October 1941

== Awards ==
Virtuti Militari, Silver Cross
Cross of Valour (Poland), three times
Distinguished Flying Cross (United Kingdom)
