= Mieczysław Adamek =

Polish World War II flying ace

Mieczysław Adamek DFC
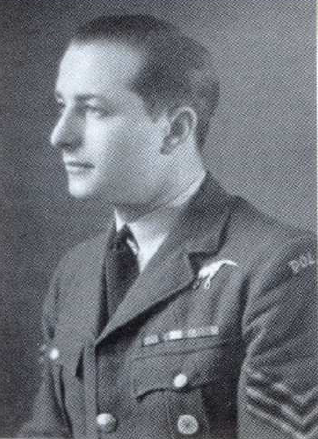
- Born: 18 September 1918; Tashkent, Soviet Union
- Died: 18 May 1944 (aged 25); English Channel
- Military career
- Allegiance: Poland; France; United Kingdom
- Branch: Polish Air Force; France Armée de l'Air; Royal Air Force
- Service years: 1936-1944
- Rank: Flying Officer
- Service number: P-2095 (RAF)
- Units: Polish 113th Fighter Escadrille; No. 303 Polish Fighter Squadron; No. 317 Polish Fighter Squadron
- Conflicts: Polish Defensive War, World War II
- Awards: Virtuti Militari; Cross of Valour; Distinguished Flying Cross (UK)

Mieczysław Adamek (18 September 1918 – 18 May 1944) DFC was a Polish fighter ace of the Polish Air Force and the RAF in World War II with 5 confirmed kills, 2 shared and 1 probable. He was awarded the Virtuti Militari, Poland's highest military decoration for heroism and courage in the face of the enemy at war, on 20 February 1941 and fought in the Polish Defensive War, the Battle of France, and the Allied invasion of continental Europe, before being killed in action on 18 May 1944.

== Biography ==
=== Early life ===
Mieczysław Adamek was born in Tashkent to Polish parents on 18 September 1918. After the end of World War I and the rebirth of the Polish State, Adamek returned to Poland with his family, where he grew up, graduating high school before attending the Crafts and Industrial School in Przemysl.

=== Flying career ===
In 1936, he entered the Air Force Non-Commissioned Officer's School for minors in Bydgoszcz, Poland. After his graduation in 1939 he was assigned to the Polish 113th Fighter Escadrille. On the first day of World War II (1 September 1939) he scored a shared victory on a He 111. On 6 September, Adamek intercepted a number of Ju. 87 aircraft and, alongside his fellow pilots, shot one down. It has been reported that Adamek, with no fuel remaining in his aircraft, was forced to land next to the downed Ju. 87, and together with locals captured the Luftwaffe pilot. On 18 September, Adamek was evacuated to France via Romania. After training on a Bloch MB.150, Adamek took part in the Battle of France, flying under the orders of Commander Eugeniusz Wyrwcki in the 4th Polish Squadron. On 22 June 1940 he flew across the Mediterranean to Algiers, and then via Casablanca and Gibraltar reached Britain in July. After training in different British schools Adamek was posted to the No. 303 Polish Fighter Squadron. On 23 June 1941 he shot down a Bf 109 in a confirmed victory, and had a probable victory with another Bf 109. Adamek shot down a further Bf 109 on 12 July 1941, and another on 12 October 1941. On 8 December 1941 he downed an Fw 190. The next year, on 14 April 1942, he shot down a Bf 109, this being his fifth individual victory, and enough to give him the honorary title of fighter ace.

In April 1943 he was transferred to No. 58 Operational Training Unit at RAF Grangemouth, Scotland where he served as an instructor. In November 1943 he was ordered to the No. 317 Polish Fighter Squadron, based at RAF Chailey in East Sussex, an Advanced Landing Ground designed to support the invasion of continental Europe by Allied Forces.

=== Death ===
On 18 May 1944, while particIpating in a 'Ranger' mission over Fecamp, France as Flight Commander, Adamek's Spiftire Mk IX was hit by flak. Adamek struggled to maintain altitude and was unable to return to base at RAF Chailey. His squadron leader ordered him to abandon the aircraft, which Adamek did over the English Channel. However, his parachute became caught on the tail of his aircraft, and he drowned. There have also been unconfirmed rumours that Adamek was ultimately shot down by British anti-aircraft defences. It is not clear whether, if so, this was in addition to flak received over France, or the only hit the aircraft received that day.

Adamek is memorialised at a monument which can be found at RAF Chailey, alongside Flight Lieutenant Jan Kurowski of 308 Squadron, who was killed in action three days later. The monument carries a quote from Josef Chielnicki of RAF Poland: "A Nation will always live, if there are people ready to die". Adamek and Kurowski were the only two airmen to have been lost from this base.

Adamek is buried in Northwood Cemetery, London, UK.

== Aerial victory credits ==
Confirmed kills

  - ^{1} / _{4} He 111 - 1 September 1939
  - ^{1} / _{of 5} Ju 87 - 6 September 1939
  - Bf 109 - 23 June 1941
  - Bf 109 - 12 July 1941
  - Bf 109 - 12 October 1941
  - Fw 190 - 8 December 1941
  - Bf 109 - 14 April 1942

Probable kill

- Bf 109 - 23 June 1941

== Awards ==
Virtuti Militari, Silver Cross
Cross of Valour (Poland), four times
Distinguished Flying Cross (United Kingdom)
