= Acme Sportsman =

General information
- Type: Sportsplane
- Manufacturer: Acme Aircraft
- Designer: Edward Stalker
- Number built: 2

History
- First flight: 2 October 1929

The Acme Sportsman was a two-seat parasol wing sportsplane built in the United States in 1928 by Acme Aircraft Corporation, a company from Rockford, Illinois. It was of conventional taildragger configuration with open cockpits in tandem and folding wings. It was designed by Edward Stalker of the University of Michigan.

== Variants ==
Acme Model 21 Sportsman
Production aircraft powered by Velie M-5 engines
Smith O
One aircraft re-engined with a 100hp Kinner K-5
Para-monoplane
The other aircraft re-engined with a 45hp Szekely SR-5

== Specifications (Sportsman model 21) ==
Data from Aerofiles Aa - Ak

General characteristics

- Crew: 1
- Capacity: 1
- Length: 22 ft 11 in (6.99 m)
- Wingspan: 36 ft 0 in (10.97 m)
- Powerplant: 1 × Velie M-5 , 55 hp (41 kW)

== See also ==
Aircraft of comparable role, configuration, and era

- RWD-8
