= Polish 113th Fighter Escadrille =

The 113th Fighter Escadrille of the Polish Air Force (Polish: 113. Eskadra Myśliwska) was one of the fighter units of the Polish Army at the beginning of World War II.

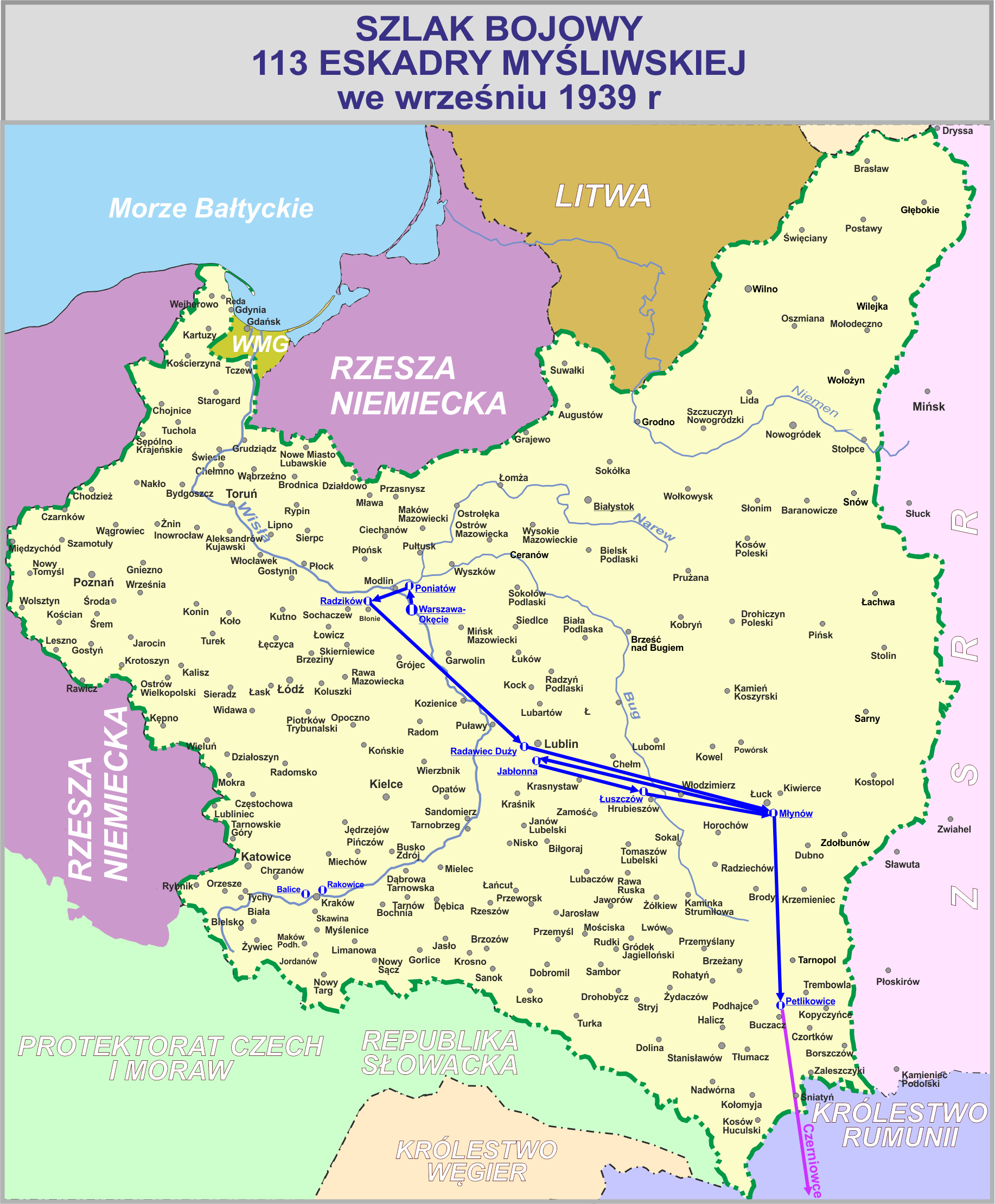

== Crew and equipment ==
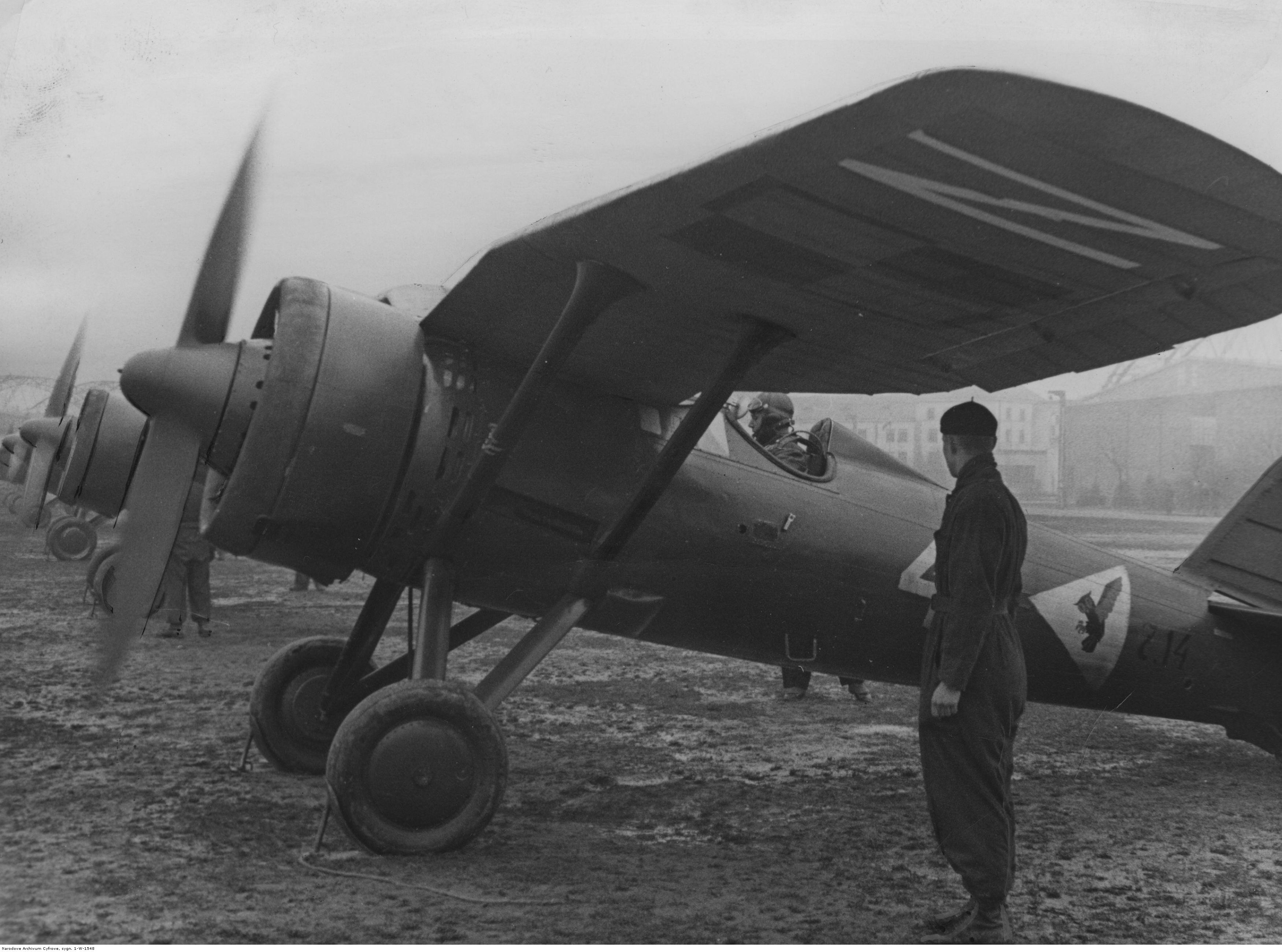
PZL P.11a from the 113th Escadrille before the war (note the unit's badge)

On 1 September 1939 the escadrille had 10 planes: five PZL P.11c and five PZL P.11a. The commanding officer was pil. Wieńczysław Barański and his deputy was ppor. pil. Włodzimierz Klawe.

Pilots

1. ppor. Hieronim Dudwał
2. ppor. Włodzimierz Klawe
3. ppor. Stanisław Zatorski
4. pchor. Rajmund Kalpas
5. pchor. Jerzy Radomski
6. pchor. Henryk Stefankiewicz
7. pchor. Janusz Szaykowski
8. plut. Mieczysław Każmierczak
9. plut. Kazimierz Sztramko
10. kpr. Michał Cwynar
11. st. szer. Mieczysław Adamek
12. st. szer. Zdzisław Horn
13. st. szer. Krzysztof Krzyżagórski
14. st. szer. Witold Lipiński

== See also ==
- Polish Air Force order of battle in 1939
