= Naval air squadron =

Military unit designation

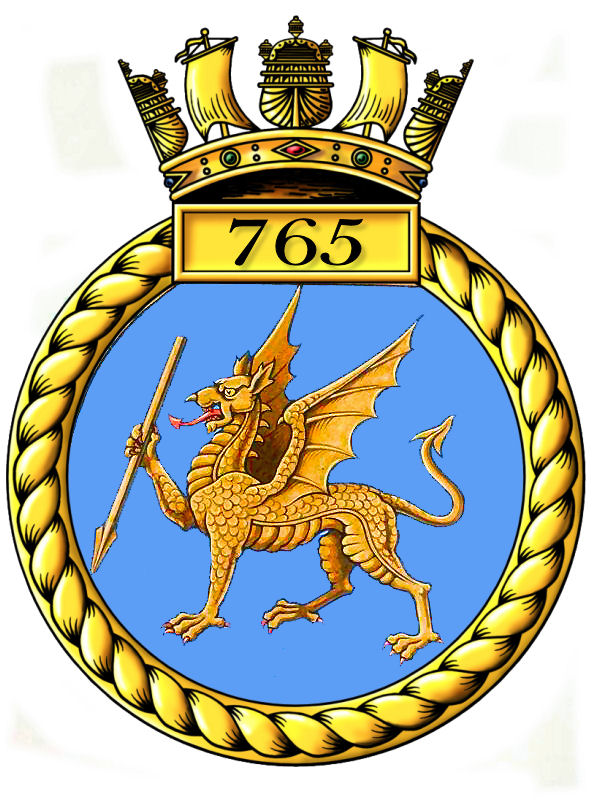
Unit badge of 765 Naval Air Squadron (765 NAS), Fleet Air Arm.

A naval air squadron (NAS) is the official title of squadrons of military naval aviation formations or units in some countries.

== India ==
The Indian Naval Air Arm are organised into approximately twenty-three (23) Indian Naval Air Squadrons, commonly abbreviated INAS nnn, where nnn is a three-digit number from 300 to 561.

== Poland ==
The Polish Morski Dywizjon Lotniczy (lit. 'Naval Air Squadron') was formed in 1920 with two escadrilles.

== United Kingdom ==
In the British Armed Forces, the naval air squadrons of the Fleet Air Arm (FAA), the combat naval aviation formation of the Royal Navy (RN), are named as nnnn Naval Air Squadron, where nnnn is a three or four digit number; their common abbreviation being nnnn NAS.

== See also ==
- Naval aviation
- Army aviation
- Air force aviation
