= RWD 8 =

Polish parasol wing monoplane trainer aircraft

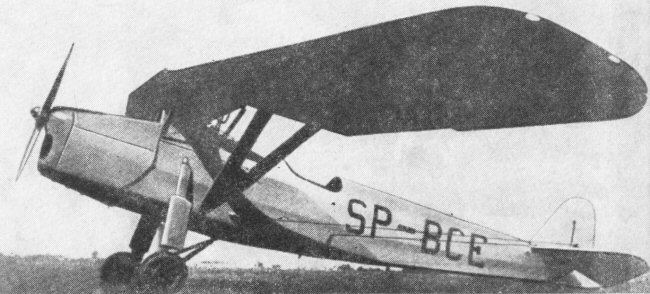

General information
- Type: Trainer aircraft
- Manufacturer: DWL (RWD) / PWS Poland and Rogozarski Yugoslavia
- Primary users: Polish Air Force Yugoslavia; Romania
- Number built: over 550

History
- Manufactured: 1934–1939
- Introduction date: 1934
- First flight: 1933
- Retired: 1948 (Israel)
- Variant: RWD 17

The RWD 8 was a Polish parasol wing monoplane trainer aircraft produced by RWD. It was used from 1934 to 1939 by the Polish Air Force and civilian aviation.

== Development ==
The RWD 8 was designed in response to a Polish Air Force requirement in 1931 for a basic trainer aircraft. It was designed by the RWD team of Stanisław Rogalski, Stanisław Wigura and Jerzy Drzewiecki. The first prototype (registration SP-AKL) was flown in early 1933. It won the contest for the new Polish military trainer, against the PZL-5bis and Bartel BM-4h biplanes. It was considered a very stable and well-handling aircraft.

Since the DWL (Doświadczalne Warsztaty Lotnicze) workshops – a manufacturer of RWD designs – had limited production capability, the Polish military decided to produce the aircraft in a nationalised factory PWS (Podlaska Wytwórnia Samolotów). DWL gave away the licence free of charge, only for covering design costs. PWS produced aircraft for both military and civilian aviation, while DWL produced aircraft for civilian use only. The first PWS-built RWD 8 was flown in September 1934. These aircraft, designated RWD 8 PWS (or RWD 8 pws), differed from the original RWD 8 DWL (or RWD 8 dwl) in minor details, mainly having thinner landing gear shock absorbers and being slightly heavier and therefore slower.

Apart from the standard variant, 50 RWD 8a PWS were built with an additional 95 L (25 U.S. gal) fuel tank in a thicker central wing section, giving increased range. A small series was built with a rear cab covered with blinds, for blind flying training. A frame with a hook for glider towing could be attached to the aircraft. A further development of the RWD 8 was the aerobatics and training aircraft, the RWD-17.

In total, over 550 RWD 8s were built (about 80 by DWL and about 470 by PWS). Production ceased in early 1939. The RWD 8 was the most numerous aircraft manufactured in Poland up to that time.

=== Technical description ===
The RWD 8 was conventional in layout and had mixed construction (steel and wood frame with canvas and plywood covering). The crew of two, sitting in tandem, were in an open cockpit, with individual windshields. Twin controls were fitted. Power came from a 4-cylinder air-cooled 90 kW (120 hp) straight engine PZInż. Junior (licence built Walter Junior) (82 kW /110 hp nominal power), 120 hp Walter Major or de Havilland Gipsy Major. A two-blade wooden propeller was fitted. The aircraft had a conventional landing gear, with a rear skid. The fuel tank in the fuselage had 75 L (18 U.S. gal) (RWD 8 PWS) or 85 L (21 U.S. gal) (RWD 8 DWL). The wings folded rearwards.

== Operational history ==
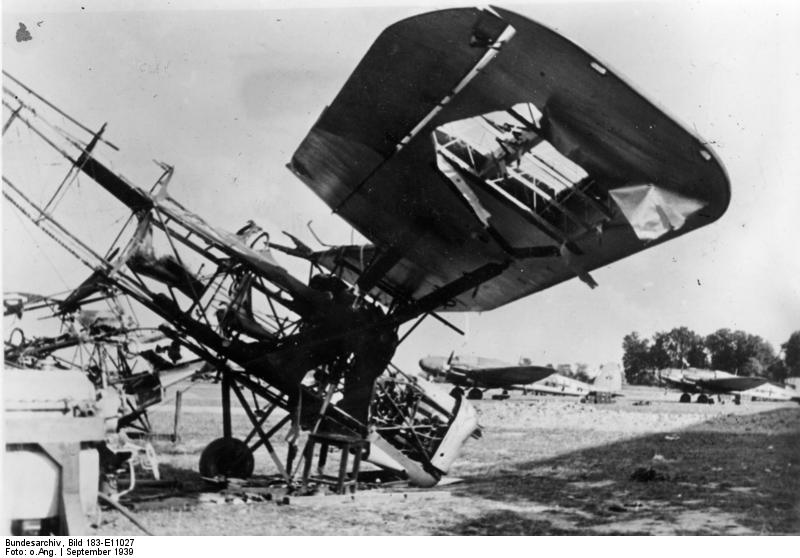
RWD 8 destroyed during the invasion of Poland.

RWD 8s were used in the Polish military trainer aviation from 1934, becoming a standard type of primary trainer. In November 1938, there were 349 RWD 8s in the Air Force. RWD 8s were also used in Polish civilian aviation – particularly in regional aeroclubs. More than 80 aircraft were bought for public collection funds in order to train aviators. They were also used in the Polish aviation sport.

A small number were exported: three were sold to Palestine, one to Spain, Morocco and Brazil. Licences for building the RWD 8 were sold to Estonia (one aircraft was produced, with markings ES-RWD) and Rogozarski of Yugoslavia (a small series with radial engines was built). At least one RWD 8 was sold to Spain via Portugal during the Spanish Civil War. It was used as a reconnaissance aircraft and a trainer for the Nationalist forces.

In the invasion of Poland 1939, the RWD 8s were used in 13 liaison flights, three aircraft in each, assigned to Armies. Many other aircraft were mobilised during the campaign and used in improvised liaison units. An advantage of the RWD 8 was its capability for short take off and landing on unprepared fields, but the missions of their crews were dangerous. RWD 8s of the Polesie Operational Group were the last Polish aircraft in the sky during the campaign. They were flying reconnaissance missions during the Battle of Kock, and even threw hand grenades.

A great number of RWD 8s were bombed by the Germans in air bases (unlike Polish combat aircraft) or burned by withdrawing Poles. A total of 57 aircraft were withdrawn to Romania, about 40 to Latvia and 2 to Hungary. About a dozen aircraft were captured by the Germans in airworthy condition. In Romania and Hungary they were used until the late 1940s. None returned to Poland after the war, and today, none have survived.

== Variants ==
RWD 8
Prototypes and initial production aircraft
RWD 8 PWS
Aircraft built by PWS (Podlaska Wytwórnia Samolotów)
RWD 8 DWL
Aircraft built by Doświadczalne Warsztaty Lotnicze (DWL)

== Operators ==
=== Civil operators ===
- Brazil: one aircraft
- Estonia: one license-built
- Morocco: one aircraft
- British Mandate for Palestine
- Poland
- Spanish Republic: one aircraft
- Kingdom of Yugoslavia
- Aero Club Belgrade three aircraft.

=== Military operators ===
Germany

- Luftwaffe (small numbers)

Hungary
Hungarian Air Force
Israel
Sherut Avir
Latvia
Latvian Air Force operated some 20 aircraft, that escaped from Poland
Poland
Polish Air Force
Romania
Royal Romanian Air Force
Spanish State
Nationalist forces acquired 1 aircraft of the SEPEWE syndicate and received via Portugal. Used it for training duties.
Kingdom of Yugoslavia

- Yugoslav Royal Air Force

== Specifications (RWD 8) ==
Data from Jane's all the World's Aircraft 1937, Polish Aircraft 1893–1939, Polskie konstrukcje lotnicze 1893-1939

General characteristics

- Crew: 2
- Length: 8 m (26 ft 3 in)
- Wingspan: 11 m (36 ft 1 in)
- Height: 2.3 m (7 ft 7 in)
- Wing area: 20 m^{2} (220 sq ft)
- Empty weight: 480 kg (1,058 lb)
- Gross weight: 750 kg (1,653 lb)
- Fuel capacity: 100 L (26 US gal; 22 imp gal)
- Powerplant: 1 × PZ Inż. Junior 4-cyl inverted air-cooled piston engine, 82 kW (110 hp) /89 kW (120 hp)
- Propellers: 2-bladed Szomański fixed pitch propeller

Performance

- Maximum speed: 175 km/h (109 mph, 94 kn) -185 km/h (115 mph; 100 kn)
- Cruise speed: 145 km/h (90 mph, 78 kn) -155 km/h (96 mph; 84 kn)
- Stall speed: 75 km/h (47 mph, 40 kn)
- Range: 435 km (270 mi, 235 nmi) -500 km (310 mi; 270 nmi)
- Service ceiling: 5,000 m (16,000 ft) -5,500 m (18,000 ft)
- Rate of climb: 4.7 m/s (930 ft/min)
- Time to altitude: 1,000 m (3,300 ft) in 4 minutes to 4 minutes 15 seconds
- Power/mass: 0.12 kW/kg (0.07 hp/lb)

== See also ==
- RWD 13

Related development

- RWD 17

Aircraft of comparable role, configuration, and era

- Acme Sportsman
- de Havilland Tiger Moth
- Levente II

== Bibliography ==
- Gerdessen, Frederik. "Estonian Air Power 1918 – 1945". Air Enthusiast, No. 18, April – July 1982. pp. 61–76. ISSN 0143-5450.
