= PWS-23 =

1920s Polish bomber and transport aircraft design project

PWS-23 was a Polish heavy bomber and transport plane design created by Zbysław Ciołkosz and Antoni Uszacki of the Podlaska Wytwórnia Samolotów (PWS) factory in Biała Podlaska. Intended as a heavier, trimotor version of the PWS-22 and submitted along with it to the Polish Ministry of Military Affairs in 1929, it was intended as a possible replacement for outdated Farman Goliath and improvised Fokker F.VII bombers in use by the Polish Army at the time. It was created in two possible configurations: the PWS-23 B3N (B3N being an acronym for "bomber, trimotor, night") and PWS-23T (T for transport). However, both designs were rejected along with the PWS-22, and the PWS-23 remained on paper only.

== History ==
In the early 1920s the Polish Army was seeking home-made "retribution bombers", that is heavy bombers in modern terminology. However, all proposals by Polish aircraft manufacturers were rejected as none were deemed skilled and experienced enough to build large, complicated bombers. Because of that the newly created 2nd Destroyer Squadron of the 1st Air Regiment in 1926 was equipped with 32 Farman Goliath bombers bought in France. However soon it became clear that the French bomber, designed in 1918, was already obsolete. Furthermore, the Goliaths were seriously underpowered and could not fly on one engine only, a serious flaw in a bomber. Because of that the Department of Air of the Ministry of Military Affairs renewed interest in a home-produced heavy bomber.

As a stop-gap solution, the Polish state bought in February 1928 a license for Fokker F.VIIB/3m long-range passenger aircraft to be produced at the Lublin-based Plage i Laśkiewicz works. By the end of that year Jerzy Rudlicki of Plage i Laśkiewicz modified the design to build the plane in bomber configuration as well: windows were sealed, the passenger cabin replaced with bomb racks for up to 1,500 kilograms (3,300 lb) bombs and a single dorsal machine gun nest. The plane, while mechanically sound, was but a stop-gap solution and the Polish Ministry of Military Affairs continued to seek a full-featured replacement for the Goliaths.

Meanwhile the LOT Polish Airlines were seeking a modern passenger plane to replace its ageing fleet of Junkers F.13 and Fokker F.VIIB/3m, and PWS-23T was presented to the Department of Aeronautics to compete with the T-600 design by State Aviation Works in June 1928. PWS' design was more complicated than its competitor, but provided accommodation for up to 20 passengers and 400 kilograms (880 lb) of cargo, twice as much as the competitor. In the end however the T-600 was accepted and a single prototype was built for evaluation under the new PZL.4 designation.

The night bomber shared a similar fate. In 1929 Plage i Laśkiewicz presented the ministry with a much heavier "flying fortress" Lublin R-XVIII design, while PWS sent two projects: PWS-22 and PWS-23. Eventually all designs were rejected and the unsuccessful LWS-6 Żubr was chosen as an interim design before the modern PZL.37 Łoś could be introduced in the 1930s. The PWS-23 remained a project only.

== Technical description ==
The PWS-23 was a high parasol wing aircraft of mixed construction, with a fixed undercarriage. A geodetic airframe of welded steel or aluminium tubing was to be covered with plywood and canvas. The wooden parasol wings reinforced with two girders were attached to the fuselage with a pyramid-like mounting.

Defensive armament included 5 machine guns, including two in a double nose mount, 2 in a double dorsal mount and 1 in a ventral retractable turret. The bombload was to exceed 2,000 kilograms (4,400 lb). The avionics included a radio, electric installation for night flights and cabin heating for the crew.

Both the bomber and transport versions were to be powered by three Bristol Jupiter IV 9Asb engines of 309–331 kilowatts (414–444 hp), including two tractors and one pusher.
