= Lublin R-XX =

Polish torpedo bomber floatplane

General information
- Type: Torpedo bomber floatplane
- Manufacturer: Plage i Laśkiewicz
- Status: Prototype
- Primary user: Polish Navy
- Number built: 1

History
- First flight: 8 April 1935
- Retired: 1937

The Lublin R-XX was the Polish torpedo bomber floatplane, designed in the early 1930s in the Plage i Laśkiewicz factory in Lublin. It remained a prototype.

== Design and development ==
In 1930 the Polish Ministry of Defence announced a contest for a torpedo-bomber floatplane for the Polish Navy. Plage i Laśkiewicz works proposed first a floatplane variant F.VIIW of a licence-built bomber (developed from a passenger plane) Fokker F.VII, but it was not built. It also proposed a floatplane variant of single-engined Lublin R-VIII biplane bomber. In a course, three R-VIIIs were converted to floatplanes and given to the Navy, but they did not meet all demands, for they were obsolete, slow and could not carry torpedoes. Then Plage i Laśkiewicz proposed quite modern twin-engined plane Lublin R-XX, the main designer of which was Jerzy Rudlicki. The last design won the contest in 1932, besting PZL-18 and PWS-62 designs, and a prototype was ordered. It was initially planned to build a series of 9.

In 1934 the prototype was built and on 22 June transported to Puck-a base of the Naval Aviation Squadron (MDLot). It appeared there, that it was tail-heavy on water, and it demanded some modifications, like lengthening engine nacelles towards front. It first flew on 8 April 1935 (some sources: 10 April); Initially the plane was kept in secret. The design was found satisfactory, but it had also faults, like moving of centre of gravity during flight and low fuselage rigidity. The prototype was modified then and returned from the factory for further trials on 30 October 1935.

In early 1935 an improved variant R-XXA was developed. It had more streamlined fuselage, covered machine gun turrets with 6 machine guns, smaller span of 23.65 m and stronger engines 750 hp Pegasus III. The Polish Navy ordered 6 production aircraft in the beginning of 1935, with planned deliveries by April 1937, and Plage i Laśkiewicz prepared to build the R-XXA prototype. However, the factory at that time was about to bankrupt (caused by a policy of Ministry of Defence, refusing to buy Lublin R-XIIIf planes), and on 23 November 1935 the Navy Headquarters broke off an order for R-XXA due to long development.

After nationalization of the bankrupt Plage i Laśkiewicz works in 1936, as the LWS, the R-XXA design was taken over as the LWS-1. However, its development was soon canceled in mid-1936, because the factory proposed a floatplane variant LWS-5 of slightly more modern LWS-6 Żubr bomber. This design was not completed as well, and the Polish Navy remained without torpedo bombers (there were finally ordered six CANT Z.506 in Italy, but only one unarmed was delivered by the outbreak of the war).

The only R-XX prototype was used in the MDLot with a number 806 until September 1937, when it was written off, then scrapped in 1938. It was planned to use floats for LWS-5 prototype.

There was also a preliminary design of a medium bomber R-XXB, from 1934-1935. It was to have a streamlined fuselage and covered gun turrets, similar to R-XXA. Main difference was a fixed conventional landing gear with wide covers and a single tailfin. It was to carry 600 kg bombs (some sources - 1500 kg). It was less modern, than LWS-6 Żubr (PZL.30) and PZL.37 Łoś and the plane, redesignated later as LWS-1/II, was not built.

== Variants ==
R-XX
Prototype.
R-XXA
Improved version with streamlined fuselage, covered machine gun turrets, smaller span and stronger Pegasus III engines. Six were ordered, none built.
R-XXB
Preliminary design of a medium bomber.

== Operators ==
Poland

- Polish Navy

== Description ==
Mixed construction low-wing cantilever monoplane, two-engine, conventional in layout. A fuselage was square in cross-section, made of a steel frame, canvas-covered (duralumin-covered in front). Wings of wooden construction, two-spar, plywood-covered. Twin strutted tail. Crew of five: in a glazed nose a bombardier-gunner, then two pilots, sitting side by side in an open cockpit. In mid-fuselage a radio operator and an upper gunner. Two Short metal floats. Four-blade wooden propellers, later three-blade metal ones. Two fuel tanks 1680 L in wings. Armament: four 7.9 mm Vickers F machine guns on ring mountings in fuselage nose and in a dorsal position. According to some sources, also one underbelly machine gun. Bomb load: up to 1,000 kg (other sources - 600 kg) or 750 kg torpedo.

== Specifications (R-XXA factory data) ==
Data from Polish Aircraft 1893–1939

General characteristics

- Crew: 5
- Length: 16.64 m (54 ft 7 in)
- Wingspan: 23.65 m (77 ft 7 in)
- Height: 5.9 m (19 ft 4 in)
- Wing area: 76.5 m^{2} (823 sq ft)
- Aspect ratio: 7.32
- Empty weight: 4,500 kg (9,921 lb)
- Gross weight: 6,800 kg (14,991 lb)
- Powerplant: 2 × PZL Pegasus VIII 9-cylinder air-cooled radial piston engines, 490 kW (660 hp) each to 510 kW (680 hp)

or 560 kW (750 hp) Bristol Pegasus III engines in NACA cowlings

- Propellers: 3-bladed metal propellers

Performance

- Maximum speed: 261 km/h (162 mph, 141 kn) at sea level
- Cruise speed: 227 km/h (141 mph, 123 kn)
- Range: 950 km (590 mi, 510 nmi)
- Ferry range: 1,650 km (1,030 mi, 890 nmi)
- Service ceiling: 5,500 m (18,000 ft)
- Rate of climb: 5.217 m/s (1,027.0 ft/min)
- Wing loading: 88.9 kg/m^{2} (18.2 lb/sq ft)
- Power/mass: 0.091 hp/lb (0.150 kW/kg)

Armament

- Guns: (proposed production aircraft)
- 2x machine-guns in nose position
- 2x machine-guns in ventral position
- 1x 20 mm (0.787 in) cannon in a dorsal turret
- Bombs: up to 1,000 kg (2,200 lb) of bombs internally, or 1x 800 kg (1,800 lb) torpedo under-fuselage

== See also ==
Aircraft of comparable role, configuration, and era

- Heinkel He 59
- Fokker T.IV
- LWS-5
