= PWS-22 =

1920s Polish bomber aircraft design project

PWS-22, otherwise known as PWS-22BN_{3} was a Polish heavy bomber design created by Zbysław Ciołkosz and Antoni Uszacki of the Podlaska Wytwórnia Samolotów (PWS) factory in Biała Podlaska. Created in 1929 as a possible replacement for outdated Farman Goliath and improvised Fokker F.VII bombers in use by the Polish Army at the time, it was rejected along all other Polish designs.

== History ==
In early 1920s the Polish Army was seeking home-made "retribution bombers", that is heavy bombers in modern terminology. However, all proposals by Polish aircraft manufacturers were rejected as none were deemed skilled and experienced enough to build large, complicated bombers. Because of that the newly created 2nd Destroyer Squadron of the 1st Air Regiment in 1926 was equipped with 32 Farman Goliath bombers bought in France. However soon it became clear that the French bomber, designed in 1918, was already obsolete. Furthermore, the Goliaths were seriously underpowered and could not fly on one engine only, a serious flaw in a bomber. Because of that the Department of Air of the Ministry of Military Affairs renewed interest in a home-produced heavy bomber.

As a stop-gap solution, the Polish state bought in February 1928 a license for Fokker F.VIIB/3m long-range passenger aircraft to be produced at the Lublin-based Plage i Laśkiewicz works. By the end of that year Jerzy Rudlicki of Plage i Laśkiewicz modified the design to build the plane in bomber configuration as well: windows were sealed, the passenger cabin replaced with bomb racks for up to 1,500 kilograms (3,300 lb) bombs and a single dorsal machine gun nest. The plane, while mechanically sound, was but a stop-gap solution and the Polish Ministry of Military Affairs continued to seek a full-featured replacement for the Goliaths.

In 1929 Plage i Laśkiewicz presented the ministry with a much heavier "flying fortress" Lublin R-XVIII design, while PWS sent two projects: PWS-22 and PWS-23. Eventually all designs were rejected and the unsuccessful LWS-6 Żubr was chosen as an interim design before the modern PZL.37 Łoś could be introduced in the 1930s. The PWS-22 remained a project only.

== Technical description ==
The PWS-22BN_{3} was a high parasol wing aircraft of mixed construction, with a fixed undercarriage and a crew of either three or four, all seated in open cabins. The wooden wings reinforced with two girders were attached to the fuselage with a pyramid-like mounting. The fuselage was to be made of steel tubes welded together and covered with plywood and canvass.

Defensive armament included 5 machine guns, including two in a double nose mount, 2 in dorsal position and 1 in a ventral retractable turret. The bombload was to exceed 1,360 kilograms (3,000 lb).

== Specifications (PWS-22BN_{3} projected) ==
Data from Polish Aircraft 1893–1939

General characteristics

- Crew: 3
- Length: 19.5 m (64 ft 0 in)
- Wingspan: 28 m (91 ft 10 in)
- Height: 6 m (19 ft 8 in)
- Wing area: 112 m^{2} (1,210 sq ft)
- Airfoil: Bobeck-Zdaniewski No.4 (Göttingen 648)
- Empty weight: 2,993 kg (6,598 lb)
- Gross weight: 5,600 kg (12,346 lb)
- Useful load:' 2,607 kg (5,747.5 lb)
- Powerplant: 2 × Gnome-Rhône 9Ab 9-cyl. air-cooled radial piston engines 313.2–335.6 kW (420–450 hp)

Performance

- Maximum speed: 200 km/h (120 mph, 110 kn)
- Cruise speed: 160 km/h (99 mph, 86 kn)
- Stall speed: 73 km/h (45 mph, 39 kn)
- Wing loading: 50 kg/m^{2} (10 lb/sq ft)
- Power/mass: 0.115 kW/kg (0.07 hp/lb)

Armament

- Guns: 5 x machine gun (2 in nose mount, 2 in dorsal mount, 1 in a ventral retractable turret)
- Bombs: 1360 kg
