= Lublin (disambiguation) =

Lublin is a city in Poland.

Lublin may also refer to:

== Communities ==
- Lublin, Wisconsin, United States
- Lublin, Moldova, a Jewish agricultural colony founded in what is now Nimereuca (Niemirówka) in 1842

== Sports teams ==
- Bystrzyca Lublin, a women's handball team
- Start Lublin, a men's basketball team
- Motor Lublin, a men's football team
- Motor Lublin, a speedway club

== People ==
- Biernat of Lublin, 15th- and 16th-century Polish poet, fabulist and physician
- Lea Lublin (born 1929), Argentine artist
- Meir Lublin, Polish rabbi from the 16th and 17th century (also called "The Maharam")
- Yaakov Yitzchak of Lublin, Chassidic rabbi from the 18th and 19th centuries.

== Political divisions ==
- Union of Lublin, the 1569 act that united Poland and Lithuania as the Polish–Lithuanian Commonwealth
- Lublin Department, a 19th-century division of the Duchy of Warsaw
- Lublin District, in the General Governorate, 1939–1944
- Lublin Voivodeship, an administrative region of eastern modern Poland
- Lublin (European Parliament constituency)

== Vehicles ==
- Lublin truck, a 1950s Polish truck, built in Lublin
- Lublin van, made in Lublin by FSC Lublin Automotive Factory
- Lublin, an aircraft produced by Plage i Laśkiewicz, the first Polish aircraft manufacturer, including:
  - Lublin R-VIII, a 1920s aircraft
  - Lublin R-XIII, a 1930s aircraft

== Universities ==
- John Paul II Catholic University of Lublin
- Medical University of Lublin
- Maria Curie-Skłodowska University of Lublin

== History ==
- Polish Committee of National Liberation, often called the Lublin Committee
- Lublin Reservation, a concentration camp set up for Jews near Lublin by the Nazis during the Second World War

== Other uses ==
- Lublin (Hasidic dynasty)
