= Władysław Świątecki =

Władysław Świątecki may refer to:

- Władysław Świątecki (inventor), Polish inventor and airman
- Władysław Świątecki (physicist), Polish nuclear physicist
