= Lublin R-IX =

Polish airliner

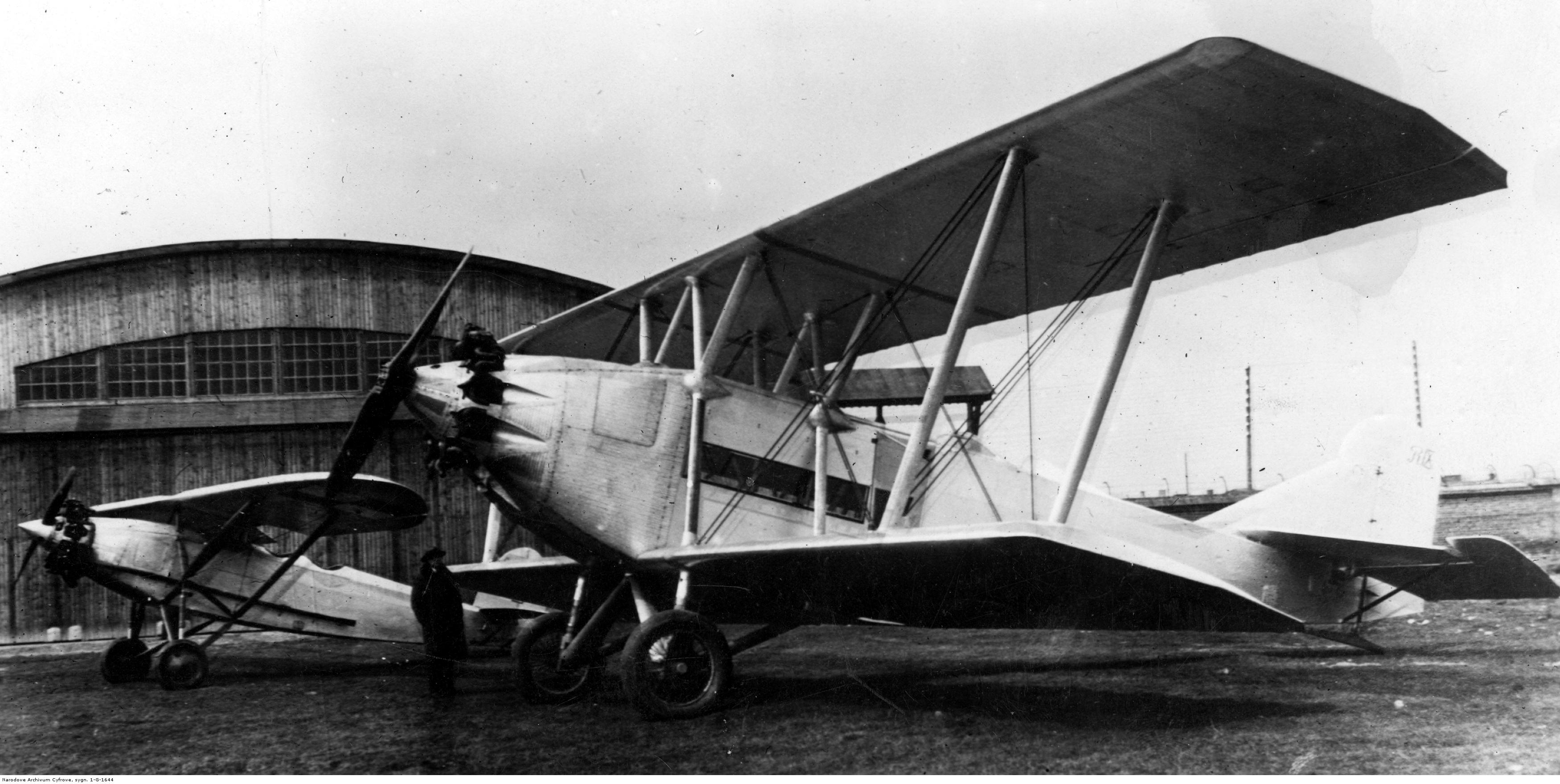
- Lublin R-IX (in the foreground)

General information
- Role: Airliner
- National origin: Poland
- Manufacturer: Plage i Laśkiewicz
- Designer: Jerzy Rudlicki
- Number built: 1

History
- First flight: April 18, 1929

The Lublin R-IX was a Polish eight-seat airliner biplane from the late 1920s, designed by engineer Jerzy Rudlicki and built by Plage i Laśkiewicz in Lublin. It was a civilian adaptation of the Lublin R-VIII military aircraft. The prototype had its flight test in April 1929; however, due to its poor performance, it was not accepted for service by LOT Polish Airlines, and serial production was not pursued.

== History ==
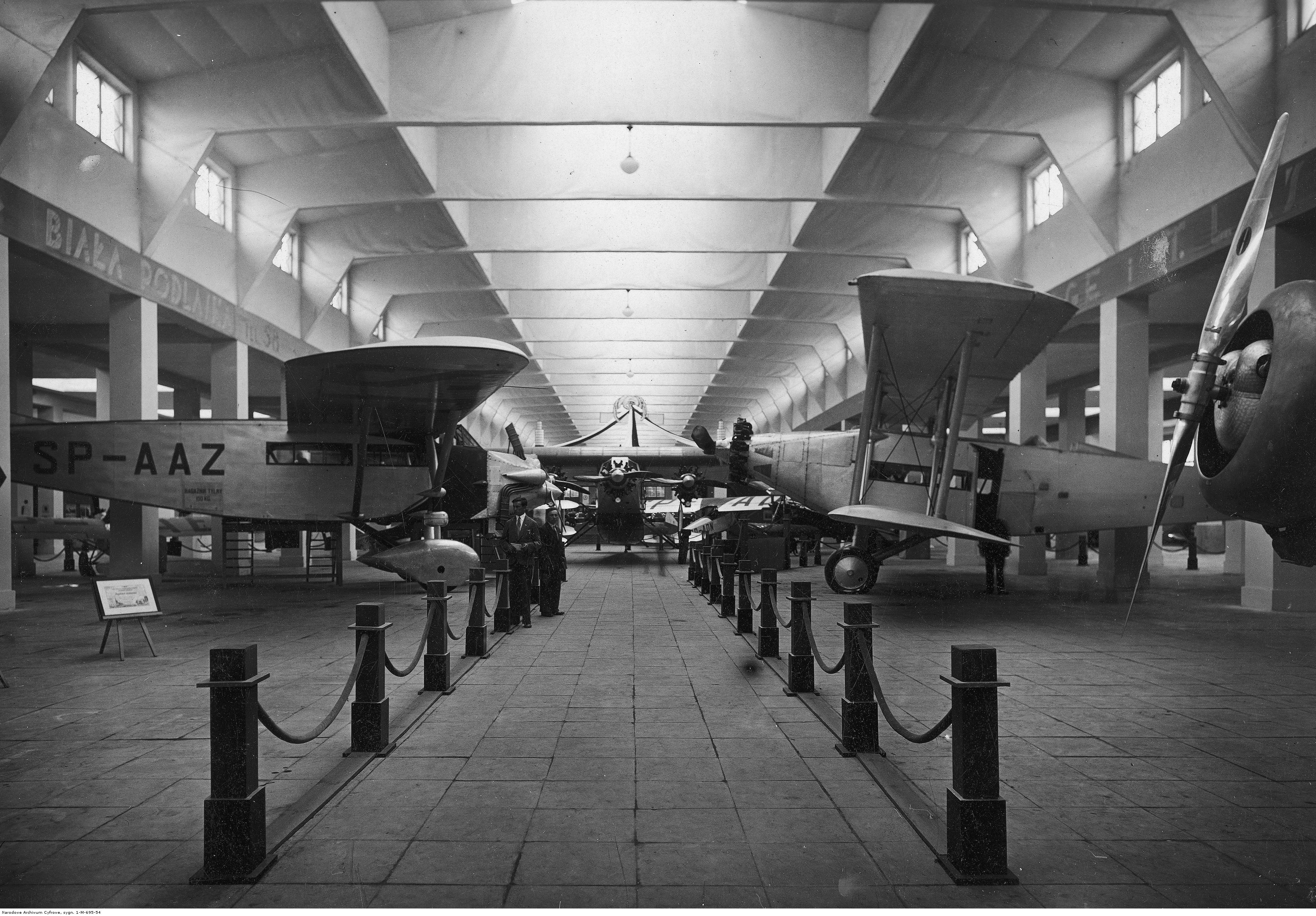
Lublin R-IX (on the right) and PWS-20 (on the left) at the International Exhibition of Communication and Tourism in Poznań

In the second half of 1927, the Ministry of Transport announced a competition for the design of an eight-seat airliner, accommodating six passengers and two crew members, intended for domestic air transport of people and goods. Eight projects were submitted to the competition, including four by Państwowe Zakłady Lotnicze (T.200, T.400, T.600, and Y), one by Podlaska Wytwórnia Samolotów (PWS-20), and one by Samolot (MN-2). The competition also attracted Plage i Laśkiewicz from Lublin, who, in late 1927 and early 1928, developed a design by engineer Jerzy Rudlicki, designated Lublin R-IX, a civilian adaptation of the Lublin R-VIII military aircraft.

The competition concluded on 10 December 1928, with engineer Zbysław Ciołkosz's PWS-20 achieving second place, the best result among the entries. Despite its poor evaluation by the competition committee, construction of the Lublin R-IX prototype began in 1928 at the order of the Airborne and Antigas Defence League, funded by a 100,000 PLN grant from the Ministry of Transport. (Note: Glass (2004, p. 196) and Cynk (1971, p. 280) state that the subsidy amounted to 50,000 PLN and came from the Airborne and Antigas Defence League.) Engineer Rudlicki collaborated with engineers Stanisław Gliński, Janusz Lange, Witold Grabowski, Marian Bartolewski, and Jerzy Teisseyre to prepare the aircraft's documentation. The prototype featured almost identical planforms and flight control surfaces to the R-VIII but introduced a new fuselage, welded from steel tubes, and a different propulsion system. The prototype made its flight test on 18 April 1929 at the factory airfield in Lublin.

From 16 May to 30 September 1929, the prototype was publicly displayed at the Polish General Exhibition in Poznań, alongside two other Lublin aircraft – R-X and R-XI. In July and August 1930, it was also exhibited at the International Exhibition of Communication and Tourism in the same city, alongside aircraft like the Lublin R-XI, PWS-20T, and Fokker F.VII.

However, the Lublin R-IX was not adopted for use by LOT Polish Airlines due to its inferior performance compared to the Fokker F.VII and Junkers F 13 aircraft already in service, particularly its lower cruising speed and more time-intensive maintenance requirements. Consequently, its serial production was not pursued, and the only prototype was stored in the airship hangar in Poznań, where it was eventually scrapped after several years.

== Design and technical specifications ==
The Lublin R-IX was a single-engine, eight-seat biplane airliner with a mixed construction design. Its fuselage consisted of a welded steel tube framework covered with fabric. The two-seat, open cockpit for the crew was located above and behind the heated and ventilated passenger cabin within the fuselage. The cabin had six seats arranged in two rows along the windows, with a door on the left side of the fuselage for access.

The rectangular wings were of wooden construction with plywood ribs. Up to the forward spar, they were covered with plywood; aft of it they were fabric covered. The upper wing, spanned 17.0 metres (55.8 ft) meters and the lower wing had a span of 14.0 m (45.9 ft). The interplane struts were made of duralumin tubes and steel tie rods with a lenticular cross-section. The lower wing's center section was braced to the fuselage with struts, while the upper wing's center section rested on a pyramid-like structure made of steel tubes. The wing chord was 2.60 metres (8.5 ft), and the total wing area was 76 m². The aircraft featured ailerons on the upper wing with Avro-type servo tabs. The wing loading was 40.8 kg/m², and the load factor was 8.5.

The aircraft was 12.10 metres (39.7 ft) long and 4.50 m (14.8 ft) high. Its empty weight was 1,814 kilograms (3,999 lb), with a useful load of 1,286 kg (2,835 lb), resulting in a maximum takeoff weight of 3,100 kg. The flight control surfaces were of classic design, made of wood and fabric-covered. They featured an adjustable vertical stabilizer and were reinforced with tie rods and struts. The control surfaces had aerodynamic balancing. The classic landing gear had a three-strut main assembly made of steel tubes, with Aerol oil-air shock absorbers. A wooden tail skid, cushioned with rubber cord, supported the rear of the aircraft.

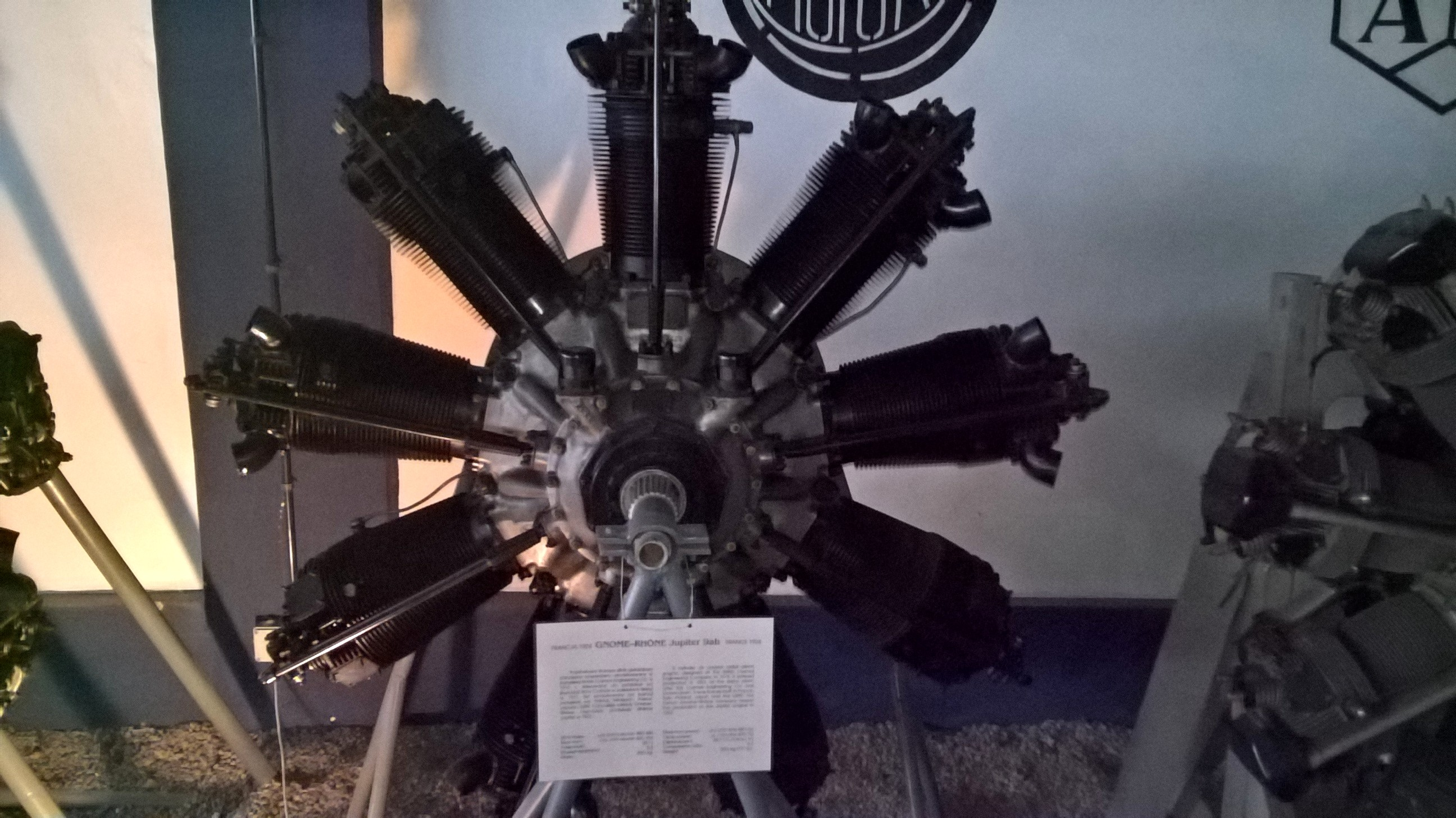
Gnome-Rhône Jupiter engine exhibited at the Polish Aviation Museum in Kraków

The aircraft was powered by a nine-cylinder, air-cooled, radial Gnome-Rhône Jupiter engine. This engine delivered a nominal power of 336 kW (450 hp) at 1,900 rpm, a takeoff power of 353 kW (480 hp), and weighed 380 kg. It drove a fixed, wooden, two-blade propeller with a diameter of 4.2 meters. The engine mount was made of steel tubes, and the front of the fuselage was covered with aluminum sheeting. The power loading was 6.4 kg/hp. A 600-liter fuel tank was located at the front of the fuselage behind the firewall, with an emergency release system available.

The aircraft's maximum speed at sea level was 175 km/h, with a cruising speed of 145 km/h and a minimum speed of 85 km/h. The fuel consumption during cruise was 120 liters per hour. It had a service ceiling of 4,000 meters and a climb rate of 3.5 m/s. The takeoff run was 100 meters, and the operational range was 700 km.

=== Paint scheme ===
The prototype Lublin R-IX was painted in a cream color.

== Specifications ==
Data from Polish Aircraft 1893–1939

General characteristics

- Crew: 2
- Capacity: 6 passengers
- Length: 12.1 m (39 ft 8 in)
- Wingspan: 17 m (55 ft 9 in)
- Height: 4.5 m (14 ft 9 in)
- Wing area: 76 m^{2} (820 sq ft)
- Empty weight: 1,814 kg (3,999 lb)
- Gross weight: 3,100 kg (6,834 lb)
- Powerplant: 1 × Gnome-Rhône Jupiter nine-cylinder air cooled radial engine, 360 kW (480 hp)

Performance

- Maximum speed: 175 km/h (109 mph, 94 kn) at sea level
- Cruise speed: 145 km/h (90 mph, 78 kn)
- Range: 700 km (430 mi, 380 nmi)
- Service ceiling: 4,000 m (13,000 ft)
- Rate of climb: 3.5 m/s (690 ft/min)

== Bibliography ==
- Cynk, Jerzy (1971). Polish aircraft 1893-1939. London: Putman & Company Limited. ISBN 0-370-00085-4.
- Glass, Andrzej (1976). Polskie konstrukcje lotnicze 1893 1939. Warsaw: Wydawnnictwa Komunikacji i Łączności.
- Glass, Andrzej (2004). Polskie konstrukcje lotnicze do 1939 r. [Polish Aviation Designs up to 1939] (in Polish). Sandomierz: Stratus. ISBN 83-916327-8-4.
