= Lublin R-XVIII =

R-XVIII

General information
- Type: Heavy bomber
- National origin: Poland
- Manufacturer: Plage i Laśkiewicz
- Designer: Jerzy Rudlicki
- Number built: 0

The Lublin R-XVIII (otherwise known as Lublin R.XVIII) was a Polish heavy bomber project, created by Jerzy Rudlicki of the Plage i Laśkiewicz factory in Lublin, based on the earlier unsuccessful Lublin R-VII Odwet design of 1924, following the specification for a "retribution bomber" by the Polish Ministry of Military Affairs.

== Design and development ==
The initial tri-motor R-VII was rejected along with all other proposals by Polish air manufacturers, as none were deemed skilled and experienced enough to build large, complicated bombers. Because of that the newly created 2nd Destroyer Squadron of the 1st Air Regiment in 1926 was equipped with 32 Farman Goliath bombers bought in France. However soon it became clear that the French bomber, designed in 1918, was already obsolete. Furthermore, the Goliaths were seriously underpowered and could not fly on one engine only, a serious flaw in a bomber. Because of that the Department of Air of the Ministry of Military Affairs renewed interest in a home-produced heavy bomber.

The Lublin-based Plage i Laśkiewicz works presented in 1929 the Lublin R–XVIII, while Podlaska Wytwórnia Samolotów submitted PWS-22 and PWS-23. The Lublin R-XVIII was in fact an upgraded and modified Lublin R-VII of 1924, utilising some of Rudlicki's concepts used in his 1922 "Project d'avion Ru - type chassis pliant" passenger plane design submitted as his doctoral thesis at the Ecole Nationale Supérieure d'Aéronautique in Paris in 1922.

A high-wing trimotor biplane of mixed construction, the aeroplane was to be powered by three radial engines of 485 kilowatts (650 hp) each and be able to deliver up to 1,500 kilograms (3,300 lb) of bombs. One of the major modifications was the Rudlicki's own patented v-tail and a possibility to use a retractable landing gear, a novelty in the 1920s. Like its predecessor, the new plane was to have strong defensive armament and a crew of 6. In line with Giulio Douhet's theories, the plane was to be a "flying fortress", able to defend itself without the need for escort fighters. Because of that the machine gun field of fire covered 98% of the sphere around the bomber.

While superior to contemporary French-made bombers, the project was far from ready and the ministry decided that before serial production could commence, the design would already be outdated. Because of that in 1928 it ordered a Fokker F–VII B/3m bomber to be produced at Plage i Laśkiewicz works instead. As an alternative to the Fokkers, in 1930 Jerzy Rudlicki restarted works on his design and by 1932 created a modified version, with only two radial engines and a payload of 1,000 kilograms (2,200 lb) of bombs. However, the redesigned Lublin R-XVIII was rejected as well and none were ever built. Likewise the PWS-22 and PWS-23 were also rejected and eventually the unsuccessful LWS-6 Żubr was chosen as an interim design before the modern PZL.37 Łoś could be introduced in the 1930s.

== Specifications (R-XVIII - trimotor version - estimated) ==
Data from

General characteristics

- Crew: 6
- Length: 13 m (42 ft 8 in)
- Wingspan: 18 m (59 ft 1 in)
- Height: 4.2 m (13 ft 9 in)
- Wing area: 170 m^{2} (1,800 sq ft)
- Max takeoff weight: 4,000 kg (8,818 lb)
- Powerplant: 3 × radial engines , 480 kW (650 hp) each

Performance

- Maximum speed: 260 km/h (160 mph, 140 kn)
- Range: 1,050 km (650 mi, 570 nmi)

Armament

- Guns: 9 x machine guns (2x2 in nose and tail turrets, 1 in each engine gondola and 2 in ventral mount)
- Bombs: 1,000 kilograms (2,200 lb) of bombs

== See also ==
Related development

- Lublin R-VII Odwet
- PWS-22 & PWS-23

Aircraft of comparable role, configuration, and era

- Vickers Virginia
- Bloch MB.200
- Farman F.160
- Lioré et Olivier LeO 25
- Dornier Do P

Related lists

- List of Interwar military aircraft
