= Lublin R-VII =

Lublin R.VII Odwet

General information
- Type: Heavy bomber
- Manufacturer: Plage i Laśkiewicz
- Designer: Jerzy Rudlicki
- Status: design only

History
- Variant: Lublin R-XVIII

Lublin R-VII Odwet (English: Revenge) was a Polish heavy bomber design created by the Plage i Laśkiewicz factory in Lublin. One of the first heavy aircraft under the Lublin brand, it was designed following a 1924 specification for a "retribution bomber" by the Polish Ministry of Military Affairs. The project, led by Jerzy Rudlicki was a trimotor high-wing mixed-construction aeroplane with heavy defensive armament. The design was submitted to the ministry in 1924, but it was lost by the mail service. As no Polish aircraft factory was deemed experienced enough to build large, complicated bombers, the newly created 2nd Destroyer Squadron of the 1st Air Regiment was equipped with 32 Farman Goliath bombers bought in France. No drawings of the R-VII have survived, but it is known that the later Lublin R-XVIII was based on it.

This aircraft should not be confused with Lublin R-XI and Lublin R-XVI, both based on Fokker F.VII passenger plane, license-built in Poland by the same manufacturer.

== See also ==
Related development

- Lublin R-XVIII

Aircraft of comparable role, configuration, and era

- Farman Goliath
