= PZL.4 =

Polish three-engine passenger aircraft

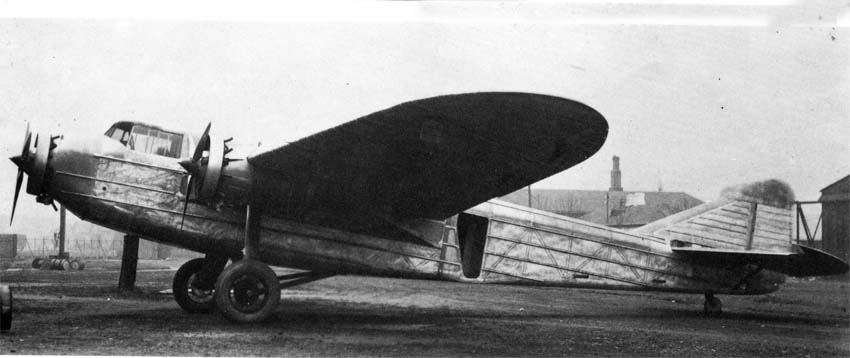

General information
- Type: Passenger aircraft
- Manufacturer: PZL
- Status: prototype
- Primary user: Polish civilian aviation (LOT Polish Airlines)
- Number built: 1

History
- Introduction date: 1933
- First flight: 8 January 1932
- Retired: 1936

The PZL.4 was a Polish three-engine passenger aircraft for 10 passengers, built in PZL factory in 1932, which remained a prototype. It was the first Polish-designed and produced multi-engine plane.

== Development ==
Despite purchasing a number of three-engine Fokker F.VIIb/3m passenger aircraft, LOT Polish Airlines soon started looking for a more modern design and organized a design contest in 1928. The contest was won by the Polish engineer Zygmunt Bruner, working in the French Bernard works, with his design T-600. It was an all-metal high-wing three-engine monoplane, similar to Ford Trimotor. The State Aviation Works (PZL) decided to take over its development, and a group of engineers was sent to Paris and worked the design in 1929, under direction of Zygmunt Bruner. There were also carried out aerodynamic trials of a model. Detailed technical drawings were worked in the PZL in Warsaw in 1930, under direction of Stanisław Prauss, and a prototype was built, designated PZL.4 (this designation had been already used before for a single-engine design worked out for a passenger plane contest in 1928, won by PWS-20, which was not built).

The PZL.4 was a high-wing cantilever monoplane of metal construction, with a closed cab and three engines. A fuselage was rectangular in cross-section, made of duralumin and covered with duralumin sheet. Two-spar wings and tailfins were covered with Wibault-pattern ribbed duralumin sheet. The wings had squared-off wingtips. A crew of two (pilot and mechanic), were accommodated in front, before the wing, and equipped with twin controls. Behind and slightly below under the wing, there was a cabin for 10 passengers in three compartments in the fuselage. The cabin had wide rectangular windows, sloped outwards for a better view, and a door on the left side. The cabin had places for a baggage behind it and below a floor.

Three 9-cylinder Polish-Skoda J-5a Whirlwind radial engines mounted in the fuselage nose and in wing nacelles provided (180 kW (240 hp) takeoff power and 160 kW (220 hp) nominal power. The engines were fitted with Townend rings and three-blade metal propellers, later changed to two-blade wooden propellers of a fixed pitch. A conventional fixed landing gear, with a rear wheel, main gear wheels' diameter 1.15 m (3 ft 9 in) was fitted. The fuel tank capacity of 915 L (242 US gal; 201 imp gal) in wing centre-section tanks, providing (cruise fuel consumption 180 L/h (48 gal/h; 40 imp gal/h)).

== Operational history ==
The prototype was first flown on 8 January 1932 in Warsaw by Bolesław Orliński (markings SP-AGY). In June 1932 it took part in an international air meeting in Warsaw. From autumn 1932 to 1935 it was evaluated by LOT Polish Airlines, but it was found unsatisfactory. The empty weight was larger by 730 kg, over the design specification, which decreased performance. As a result, its performance was inferior to Fokker F.VIIb/3m, with the same engines. Proposals to use 220 kW (300 hp) Gnome-Rhône 7K or 340 kW (450 hp) Pratt & Whitney R-1340 Wasp engines were rejected by LOT (the latter engines would demand strengthening of construction).

The prototype cost was 1,416,110 złoty and it brought the manufacturer 663,000 złoty loss. The prototype was withdrawn from service in 1936 and scrapped in 1937.

== Specifications ==
Data from Polish Aircraft 1893–1939

General characteristics

- Capacity: 10-14 passengers
- Length: 16.5 m (54 ft 2 in)
- Wingspan: 24.4 m (80 ft 1 in)
- Height: 3.3 m (10 ft 10 in)
- Wing area: 77 m^{2} (830 sq ft)
- Empty weight: 4,081 kg (8,997 lb)
- Gross weight: 5,586 kg (12,315 lb)
- Fuel capacity: 915 L (242 US gal; 201 imp gal)
- Powerplant: 3 × Polish-Skoda J-5a Whirlwind 9-cylinder air-cooled radial piston engines, 160 kW (220 hp) each
- Propellers: 3-bladed Heddernheimer Kupferwerke adjustable-pitch metal propellers

Performance

- Maximum speed: 190 km/h (120 mph, 100 kn) at sea level

179 km/h (111 mph; 97 kn) at 2,000 m (6,600 ft)

- Range: 800 km (500 mi, 430 nmi)
- Service ceiling: 2,800 m (9,200 ft)
- Time to altitude:

1,000 m (3,300 ft) 8 minutes 58 seconds
2,000 m (6,600 ft) 22 minutes

- Wing loading: 72.6 kg/m^{2} (14.9 lb/sq ft)
- Power/mass: 0.0535 hp/lb (0.0880 kW/kg)

== See also ==
Aircraft of comparable role, configuration, and era

- Fokker F.VIIb/3m
- Ford Trimotor
