= Lublin R-X =

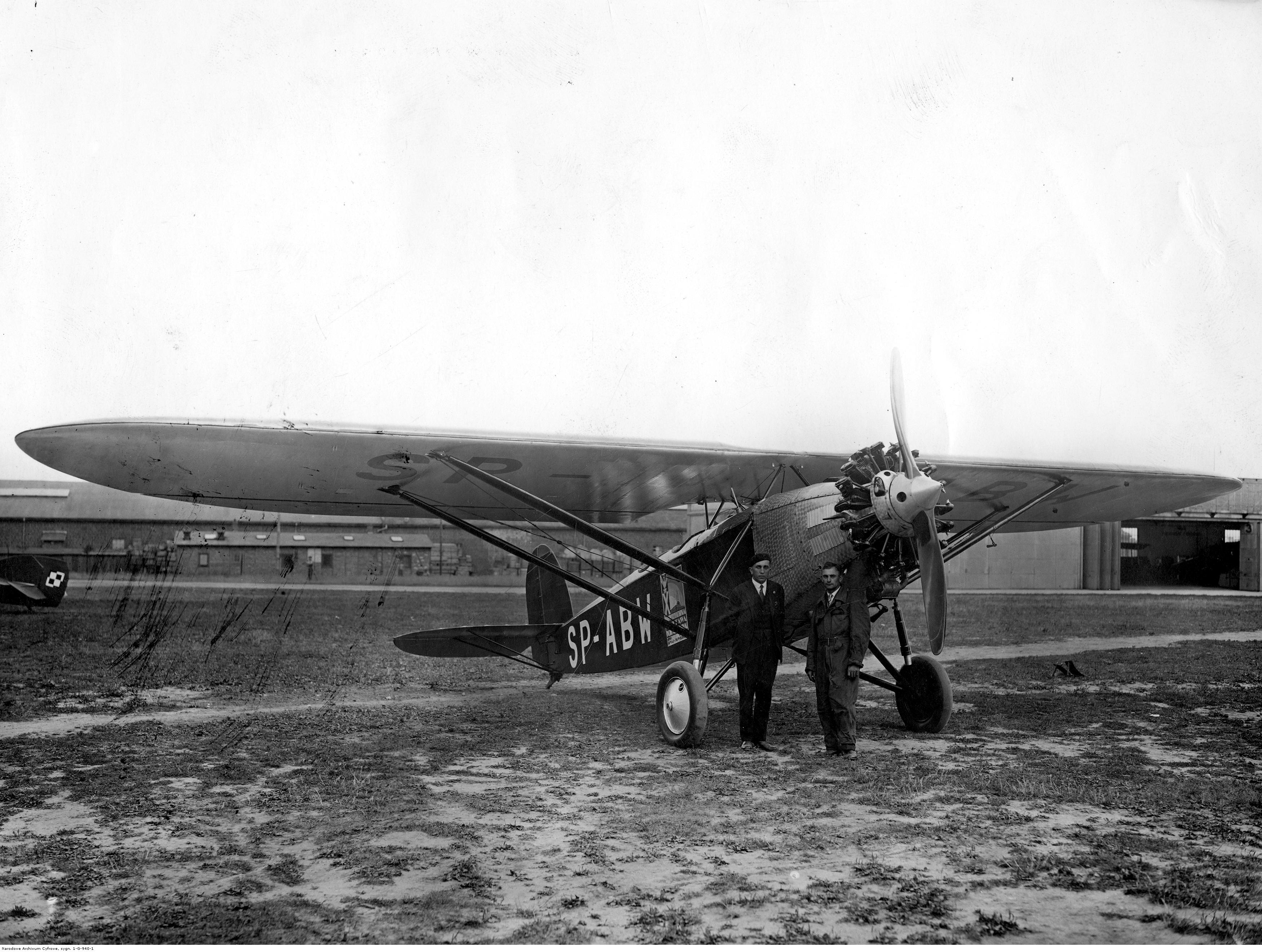

General information
- Type: Liaison aircraft
- Manufacturer: Plage i Laśkiewicz
- Designer: Jerzy Rudlicki
- Primary user: Polish Air Force
- Number built: 7

History
- Manufactured: 1929
- Introduction date: 1929
- First flight: 8 February 1929
- Retired: 1939
- Developed into: Lublin R-XIII

The Lublin R-X was a Polish single-engined, two seat liaison aircraft, built in 1929 in the Plage i Laśkiewicz factory in Lublin. Seven were completed, two of them prototypes. Four served with Polish air regiments and another made several notable long flights and tours.

== Development ==
In 1927, the Polish War Ministry opened a contest for a military liaison and observation plane for use by Army land units operating from casual airfields. The private factory Plage i Laśkiewicz in Lublin proposed the Lublin R-X, designed in 1928 by Jerzy Rudlicki. Fitted with skis, the prototype was first flown, off snow, on 8 February 1929, followed by a second prototype in the spring. They were extensively tested and handled very well. During these tests, both prototypes became the first Polish aircraft to be fitted with Townend rings around their normally uncowled radial engines. Five pre-series aircraft followed 1929, the first four differing from the prototypes in having a detachable ring mounting for a 7.7 mm (0.30 in) Lewis gun in the rear cockpit. The fifth, designated the R-Xa, was built as a strengthened, unarmed, long-distance tourer with a modified exhaust system and a fuel capacity of 1,000 L (220 imp gal; 260 US gal) that gave it an endurance of 18 hours.

== Design ==
The R-X was a braced parasol wing design of mixed construction (steel and wood) and conventional in layout. Its wing was built in two parts based on two wooden spars, with plywood around the leading edge and fabric covered elsewhere. In plan the wing was rectangular centrally, with semi-elliptical tips. It was braced by a pair of parallel steel struts to the lower fuselage and held over the fuselage by an inverted-V cabane.

Structurally its fuselage was a rectangular section frame formed with welded steel tubes. The forward part was covered with duralumin sheet and the rest with fabric. It was powered by a 220 hp (160 kW) Wright Whirlwind J-5Ab, an air-cooled, nine-cylinder radial engine licence built in Poland by Skoda. This was usually uncowled, though Townend rings were fitted to some examples from time to time. Both wood and metal propellers of 3.0 m (9 ft 10 in) diameter were used. There was a droppable fuel tank in the forward fuselage. The R-X had two open cockpits in tandem, fitted with dual controls; the rear cockpit had a gun-mounting ring.

Its empennage was conventional and structurally similar to the fuselage, with steel tube frames and fabric covering. The tailplane was mounted on top of the fuselage and braced from below by a pair of parallel struts on each side. In plan the tailplane and elevator had constant chord out to semi-elliptical tips. Fin and rudder were more rounded, the latter extended down to the keel, operating in an elevator cut-out.

The R-X had a divided undercarriage with a track of 3.0 m (9 ft 10 in). Each mainwheel was on a half-axle and a radius rod, each hinged on the lower fuselage longeron, with a shock-absorbing oleo strut attached to the forward wing strut at a point where it was strengthened by a strut to the rear wing strut base and another to the upper longeron.

For ease of transport, the R-X's wings could be folded back flat alongside the fuselage, leading edges down, once the tailplanes had been folded upwards.

== Operational service ==
The pre-series R-Xs were used by the Polish Air Force from 1929 as liaison aircraft and staff transports.

The R-Xa, registered as SP-ABW and named "Srebrny Ptak" (Silver Bird) was used for several long-distance flights. In summer 1929 there were international exhibitions in both Poznań and Barcelona which included the aviation industry. On August 25, 1929, the R-Xa flew non-stop between the cities, piloted by Waclaw Makovskia. He and his passenger covered 1,700 km (1,100 mi; 920 nmi) in 12 hr 15 min. In October it took part in the 1st Tour of Southwestern Poland.

In 1931 Stanisław Karpiński was planning a long flight to the Middle East. To test the suitability of the R-Xa he made three tours of Poland and then made a five-day round trip from Warsaw via Bucharest, Istanbul, Rome, Turin and London, a distance of 6,450 km (4,010 mi; 3,480 nmi). This experience led to modifications to his aircraft, including fuel distribution, a strengthening of the undercarriage, together with aerodynamic refinements including a Townend ring and spatted wheels. After the changes the type was sometimes referred to as the R-Xa bis.

IStarting on 2 October 1932 he began his planned journey from Warsaw to Kabul through Istanbul, Baghdad, Teheran and Herat. He returned the same way as far as Baghdad, then flew to Cairo, Jerusalem, Aleppo and Istanbul, reaching Warsaw on 24 October via Lublin. This was a journey of 14,390 km (8,940 mi; 7,770 nmi), with a flight time of 108 hr 50 m.

Although the R-X never reached series production, a descendant, the Lublin R-XIII, was built in large numbers.

== Operators ==
Poland

- Polish Air Force

== Specifications (R-X) ==
Data from Jane's all the World's Aircraft 1931, Polish Aircraft 1893–1939

General characteristics

- Crew: 2
- Length: 8.33 m (27 ft 4 in)
- Wingspan: 13.5 m (44 ft 3 in)
- Height: 2.98 m (9 ft 9 in)
- Wing area: 26 m^{2} (280 sq ft)
- Airfoil: Clark Y (modified)
- Empty weight: 900 kg (1,984 lb)
- Gross weight: 1,300 kg (2,866 lb)
- Fuel capacity: Approx. 300 L (79 US gal; 66 imp gal) jettisonable fuel tank in the fwd. fuselage; R-Xa Long-range record attempt aircraft had a 1,000 L (260 US gal; 220 imp gal) fuel tank
- Powerplant: 1 × Polish-Skoda J-5 Whirlwind 9-cylinder air-cooled radial piston engine, 170 kW (230 hp)
- Propellers: 2-bladed fixed-pitch wooden propeller

Performance

- Maximum speed: 180 km/h (110 mph, 97 kn)
- Stall speed: 65 km/h (40 mph, 35 kn)
- Range: 750 km (470 mi, 400 nmi)
- Endurance: 5 hours; R-Xa 18 hours
- Service ceiling: 6,000 m (20,000 ft)
- Wing loading: 50 kg/m^{2} (10 lb/sq ft)
- Power/mass: 0.1325 kW/kg (0.0806 hp/lb)

Armament

- Guns: 1x flexibly mounted 7.7 mm (0.303 in) Lewis gun in the rear cockpit

== See also ==
Aircraft of comparable role, configuration, and era

- PZL Ł.2
