= Swiatecki bomb slip =

Slip bomb device invented by Władysław Świątecki

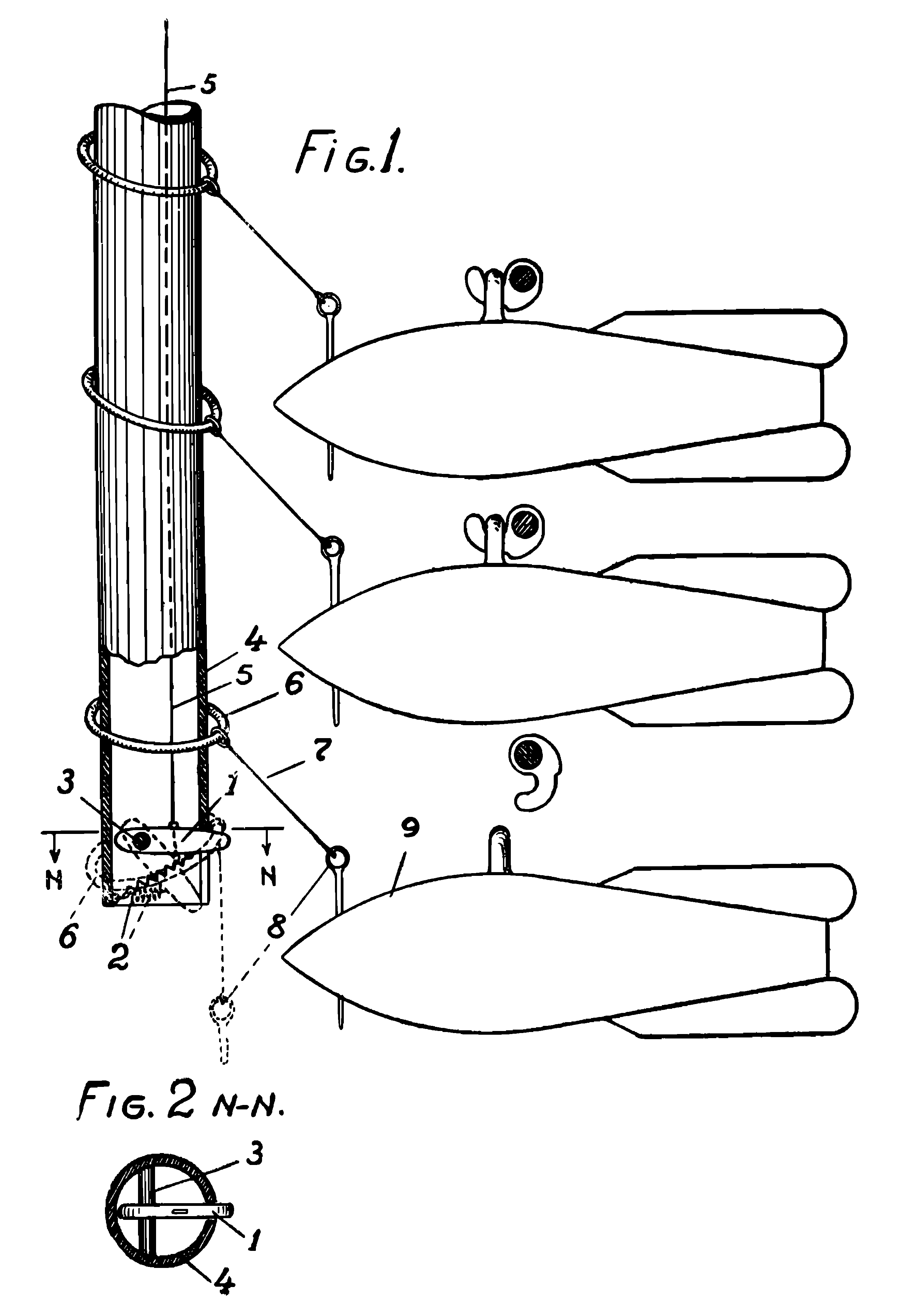
Drawing from the patent application.

The Swiatecki bomb slip was a slip bomb device of Polish inventor Władysław Świątecki used in many Allied bombers during World War II.

== History ==
Świątecki designed a bomb-release system in 1923. His invention was patented in 1926 in Poland and abroad. The first use was planned for the Karaś P.23 light bomber and for Łoś bomber but not used. From 1930 the inventor produced the "Swiatecki bomb slip" in own branch in Lublin. First use of his invention took place in 1925 when the Polish Navy mounted it in imported aircraft - CANT Z.506B. Świątecki sold licences from 1937 to France - Gardy, and Italy - Caproni.

After the Invasion of Poland in 1939 Świątecki evacuated to Hungary and via Yugoslavia and Italy to France (Paris) where he worked as engineer in military industry. Then, when France collapsed in June 1940, he escaped again, with his family, travelling to North Africa and then by ship to England. There he demonstrated his device to the Ministry of Aircraft Production. He went on to serve in the Royal Air Force as a Flight Lieutenant.

The slip device was modified for use in the Lancasters of 9, 12 and 617 Squadrons of the Royal Air Force for the use of the Tallboy and Grand Slam giant aerial bombs. The Boeing B-29 was modified to carry Grand Slam and Tallboy and the giant 42,000 lb (19 t) T-12 bomb, the slip device (The D-9 carrier) was a modification of the Swiatecki bomb slip. These weapons were the largest air-dropped bombs before the atomic bomb. In Project Harken and Project Ruby the Swiatecki devices performed flawlessly.

His slip device was the subject of debate at the Royal Commission on Awards to Inventors from 1946 to 1955. The Ministry claimed the device was invented at the Royal Aircraft Establishment, Farnborough and developed by Vickers Armstrongs. The family received an ex gratia award of £350.

In 1943, an updated version of Świątecki invention was created by Jerzy Rudlicki for the American Boeing B-17 Flying Fortress.
