= PWS-20 =

First Polish passenger plane

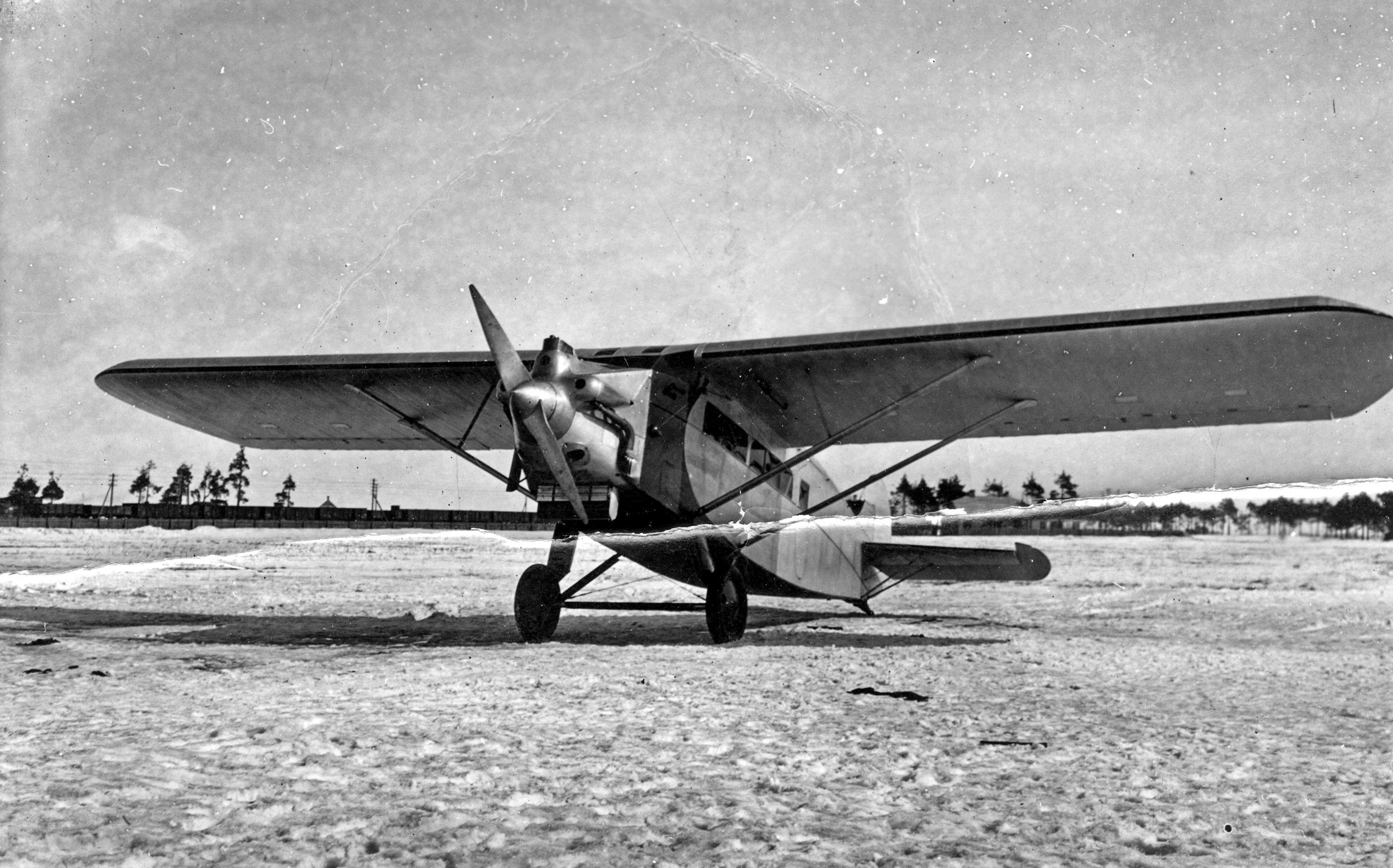

General information
- Type: Passenger aircraft
- Manufacturer: PWS
- Designer: Zbysław Ciołkosz
- Status: retired
- Primary user: Polish civilian aviation (LOT Polish Airlines)
- Number built: 3

History
- Manufactured: 1929-1930
- Introduction date: 1929
- First flight: 12 March 1929
- Retired: 1933

The PWS-20 was a Polish single-engine high-wing 8 passenger airliner, built in the PWS factory and when it made its first flight in 1929 it became the first Polish-designed transport aircraft to fly.

== Development ==
The aircraft was developed by Zbysław Ciołkosz in response to a request announced by the Polish Ministry of Communication in 1927 for an airliner to be used by LOT Polish Airlines, and was competing against a sizable number of other designs from other Polish designers, including the Stemal VII, 4 unbuilt proposals from PZL, the Lublin R-IX, and the Medwecki M.N.2. Of the designs submitted, the PWS-20 was selected as being the best design. A prototype was built and first flew on 12 March 1929 from Biała Podlaska. After brief flight testing it was bought by the Ministry of Communication for evaluation as the PWS-20T, with the T signifying transport.

In 1930, following testing by LOT, the aircraft was modified with a wider undercarriage, improved windscreen, engine cooling and exhaust systems, and the passenger cabin was rearranged with permanent seating for 8 passengers, having initially been designed for 6 fixed seats, and two folding seats that could be replaced with a bunk bed. The modifications resulted in the first aircraft being redesignated as the PWS-20bis, which was named Zula and registered as SP-AAZ. In the same year a second PWS-20bis was built, named Yaga and registered as SP-AAY.

PWS had started a construction of a third airframe for LOT, to have been SP-AAX, but it was never delivered and the registration was reassigned. Plans for an around the world flight resulted in the third airframe being modified, with additional fuel tanks in the fuselage which extended the range to 6,450 km (4,010 mi), while the crew compartment was rearranged to seat a navigator along with a pilot and co-pilot, along with a radio and other navigational aids. It was test flown but the proposed flight was abandoned when sufficient money could not be raised.

A floatplane variant, the PWS-20ter was also planned, for Denmark and Sweden, but it was not completed.

== Operational service ==
When first introduced into LOT service in 1930, the type briefly carried passengers between Warsaw and Bucharest, before being transferred in 1930 to the domestic route between Warsaw and Lwów, primarily carrying express freight including pastries, and E. Wedel confectioneries, which they did until 1931.

LOT had already ordered a batch of single-engine Fokker F.VIIa/1m aircraft from the Netherlands, and while the performance and flight characteristics of PWS-20 were similar to the Fokkers, LOT's focus was moving toward longer international routes, which required a larger aircraft, such as the tri-motored version of the F.VII, and the need for either single engine type was shrinking, and worse, with only two in service, the PWS-20 was a maintenance problem. In 1933 one aircraft was written off in Warsaw while the second was withdrawn from use after having been stored.

== Description ==
The PWS-20 was a high-wing braced monoplane with an enclosed cabin and a single engine mounted in the nose.

The constant chord wings had rounded wingtips and were built up around two wood spars, with plywood ribs and a doped linen covering. Fuel tanks were located in the wing roots, between the spars. The empennage was built up as a frame and also covered in linen. The forward fuselage was a metal framework skinned with plywood, while the rear fuselage was a wooden framework covered with plywood and doped linen.

The crew of two, a pilot and a mechanic, sat in a cabin ahead of the wing, and were provided with dual controls. Behind them and under the wing, there was a 3.15 m (10.3 ft) long cabin with seating for six passengers. Wide rectangular windows were provided, along with a door on the left side. Two additional passengers could be carried on folding seats and there was a toilet, as well as room for 220 kg (490 lb) of baggage in two compartments.

The PWS-20 was powered with a 450 hp (340 kW) (nominal) or 487 hp (363 kW) (take-off power) Lorraine-Dietrich LD 12Eb W12 engine produced under licence by the Polish Skoda Works, driving a 3.2 m (10 ft) diameter two-blade fixed pitch metal propeller. Cooling was provided by a radiator mounted under the fuselage near the firewall, and the engine was faired into the fuselage with a duralumin cowling. Fuel consumption at cruising speed and altitude was 100–110 L (22–24 imp gal; 26–29 US gal) per hour.

A conventional fixed landing gear, with a tail skid was fitted. Initially this was formed from two vees, attached to the lower fuselage longerons and to each other with a spreader bar, with a wheelbase of 2.5 m (8 ft 2 in), this was replaced by individual legs, with a vee connected to the fuselage, and a vertical strut connected to the upper longeron, through one of the wing struts, with a wider 3.54 m (11.6 ft) wheelbase. For initial tests, skis were used.

== Specifications (PWS-20bis) ==
Data from Polish aircraft 1893-1939

General characteristics

- Crew: 2 (pilot and engineer/mechanic)
- Capacity: 8
- Length: 12.67 m (41 ft 7 in)
- Wingspan: 17.6 m (57 ft 9 in)
- Height: 3.71 m (12 ft 2 in)
- Wing area: 52.9 m^{2} (569 sq ft)
- Airfoil: Bobek-Zdaniewski No.4 (Göttingen 648)
- Empty weight: 1,850 kg (4,079 lb)
- Gross weight: 3,200 kg (7,055 lb)
- Fuel capacity: 600 L (160 US gal; 130 imp gal) in two wing tanks, with a supplementary 80 L (21 US gal; 18 imp gal) tank in the rear fuselage
- Powerplant: 1 × Lorraine-Dietrich 12E W-12 water-cooled piston engine, 340 kW (450 hp)
- Propellers: 2-bladed fixed-pitch Duralumin propeller, 3.2 m (10 ft 6 in) diameter

Performance

- Maximum speed: 200 km/h (120 mph, 110 kn) at sea level
- Cruise speed: 160 km/h (99 mph, 86 kn)
- Landing speed: 93 km/h (58 mph; 50 kn)
- Range: 800 km (500 mi, 430 nmi)
- Service ceiling: 3,800 m (12,500 ft)
- Wing loading: 60.5 kg/m^{2} (12.4 lb/sq ft)
- Power/mass: .106 kW/kg (0.064 hp/lb)

== See also ==
Aircraft of comparable role, configuration, and era

- Fairchild 100 Pilgrim
- Farman F.300
- Focke-Wulf A 17 Möwe
- Fokker F.VIIa/1m
- Latécoère 28
- Messerschmitt M 18
- Stinson Detroiter
