= Lublin R-VIII =

Polish bomber, reconnaissance aircraft and seaplane

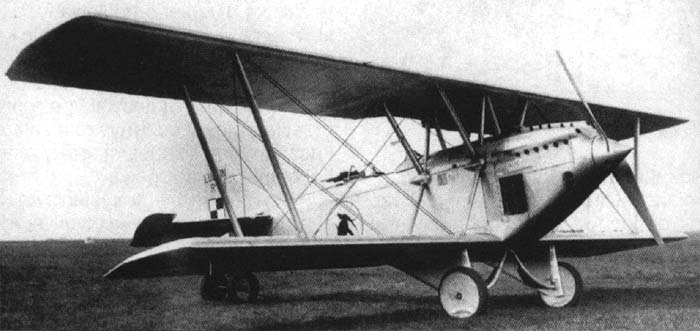

General information
- Type: Bomber and reconnaissance aircraft
- Manufacturer: Plage i Laśkiewicz
- Primary user: Polish Air Force and Polish Navy
- Number built: 6

History
- Manufactured: 1928-1930
- Introduction date: 1930
- First flight: March, 1928
- Retired: 1939

The Lublin R-VIII was a Polish bomber, reconnaissance aircraft and seaplane designed in the late 1920s by the Plage i Laśkiewicz factory in Lublin. It was the first in-house design of Plage i Laśkiewicz, and the first with the name Lublin.

== Development ==
The aircraft was designed in answer to a request of the Polish Air Force for a heavy single-engine reconnaissance and bomber airplane. Work started in 1926. The main designer was Jerzy Rudlicki (the letter "R" in the designation for his name). The prototype R-VIII was flown in March 1928. It was fitted with a 550 hp (410 kW) Farman 12We W-12 engine, but in tests proved to be underpowered. In July 1928 the second prototype was completed with a more powerful 740 hp (550 kW) Lorraine-Dietrich 18Kd engine. In August 1928 it flew in the Aviation Contest of the Little Entente and Poland. It achieved the best result in trials of carrying a payload (1,024 kg (2,258 lb) to an altitude of 5,000 m (16,000 ft).

In 1929, the Polish Aviation Department of War Ministry ordered four aircraft with the designation R-VIIIa. They were built in early 1930. One was fitted with a Lorraine-Dietrich engine, the rest with the 760 hp (570 kW) Hispano-Suiza 12Lb. More were not ordered, as the aircraft had good performance when carrying only a limited payload and fuel reserve (which limited its range), when it carried more bombs, or maximum fuel load, its performance was poor.

The prototypes and serial production aircraft were used by the Polish Air Force only for a short time. In August–September 1930, three R-VIIIa flew in the Aviation Contest of the Little Entente and Poland, taking a mediocre 7th and 9th places. In service, both Lorraine-Dietrich-powered aircraft crashed - in 1930 and 1931.

In 1932, the existing R-VIIIs were converted to floatplanes for the Polish Navy. The first prototype was fitted with Lorraine-Dietrich engine and was designated R-VIII bis (Aircraft number 801). Two aircraft with Hispano-Suiza engines were designated R-VIII ter (numbers 802 and 803). The fourth aircraft was broken into spare parts. The maximum speed of the floatplane variant was lowered to 200 km/h. They were also called R-VIII/hydro.

A six-seat passenger aircraft, the R-IX, was developed in 1929, based on the R-VIII, but it remained a prototype.

== Operational service ==
The R-VIII floatplanes were used by the Polish Naval Aviation Squadron (MDLot) in Puck from 1933, in a long reconnaissance escadre. From 1938, they were assigned to training, and were scheduled for withdrawal from service. They survived until the Invasion of Poland in 1939, but the R-VIII bis had its engine removed by then. After the first German air raid on naval aviation base in Puck on September 1, all floatplanes were evacuated from Puck to the Hel Peninsula (the bulk were Lublin R-XIIIs). Since R-VIIIs were quite obsolete by then, they were not used in combat. They were anchored on Puck Bay by Chalupy on Hel Peninsula, near the base of the peninsula, where they were bombed by Stukas on September 8.

== Description ==
Wooden construction biplane, conventional in layout. A fuselage was rectangular in cross-section, plywood covered. Wings canvas and plywood covered, upper wing of greater span. Crew of two, sitting in tandem in an open cockpit, with twin controls (three crewmen could be carried as well, with radio operator). Conventional fixed landing gear, with a rear skid, or two Short floats.

=== Powerplants ===
- W-12 Farman12We 550 hp (410 kW), fitted to the first prototype, but proved under-powered.
- W-18 Lorraine-Dietrich 18Kd 650 hp (480 kW) power, 740 hp (550 kW) take-off power, water-cooled (second prototype, one serial R-VIIIa, R-VIIIbis)
- V-12 Hispano-Suiza 12Lb 650 hp (480 kW) power, 760 hp (570 kW) take-off power, water-cooled (three serial R-VIIIa, R-VIIIter)

== Operators ==
Poland

- Polish Air Force
- Polish Navy

== Specifications (R-VIIIa, Lorraine-Dietrich 18Kd engine) ==
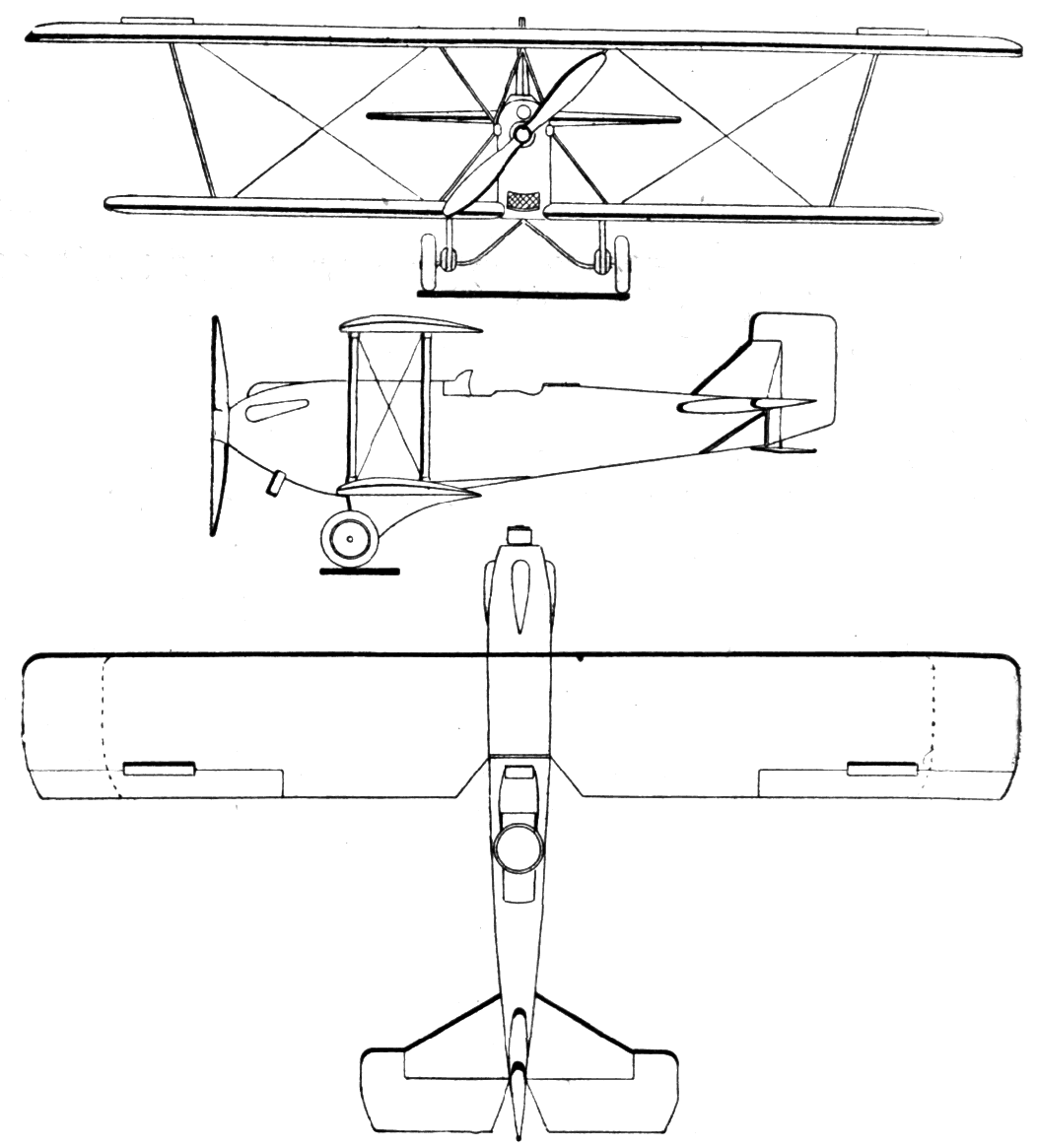
Lublin R-VIII 3-view drawing from Les Ailes May 24, 1928

General characteristics

- Crew: 2
- Length: 11.125 m (36 ft 6 in)
- Wingspan: 17 m (55 ft 9 in)
- Height: 4.5 m (14 ft 9 in)
- Wing area: 76.4 m^{2} (822 sq ft)
- Empty weight: 2,457 kg (5,417 lb)
- Gross weight: 4,300 kg (9,480 lb)
- Max takeoff weight: 5,000 kg (11,023 lb)
- Fuel capacity: 1,200 L (320 US gal; 260 imp gal) + optional auxiliary tanks
- Powerplant: 1 × Lorraine-Dietrich 18Kd W-18 water-cooled piston engine, 552 kW (740 hp) for take-off

484 kW (649 hp) rated power

- Propellers: Levasseur No.704
- Propellers: 4.4 m (14 ft 5 in) diameter fixed-pitch metal propeller

Performance

- Maximum speed: 230 km/h (140 mph, 120 kn) at sea level
- Cruise speed: 195 km/h (121 mph, 105 kn)
- Stall speed: 85 km/h (53 mph, 46 kn)
- Range: 1,490–1,720 km (930–1,070 mi, 800–930 nmi)
- Service ceiling: 5,700 m (18,700 ft)
- Rate of climb: 5.25 m/s (1,000 ft/min)
- Time to altitude: 1,000 m (3,300 ft) in 3 minutes 43 seconds
- Wing loading: 56.6 kg/m^{2} (11.6 lb/sq ft)
- Power/mass: 0.07 kW/kg (0.043 hp/lb)
- Take-off run: 40–60 m (130–200 ft)

Armament

- Guns: 1 × fixed front-firing 7.7 mm Vickers E machine gun and 2 × movable 7.7 mm Lewis machine guns
- Bombs: 1,000 kg (2,200 lb) bombs (300 kg (660 lb) in floatplane variant)

== See also ==
Related development

- Lublin R-IX

Aircraft of comparable role, configuration, and era

- Amiot 122
- Levasseur PL 7
- Avro Aldershot
- Heinkel He 60
