= Władysław Świątecki (physicist) =

Polish physicist

Władysław J. Świątecki
- Born: 22 April 1926; Paris, France
- Died: 30 September 2009 (aged 83); Berkeley, California
- Known for: Pioneering research in nuclear physics, including the nuclear shell model and the theory of the "island of stability"
- Awards: Marian Smoluchowski Medal (1989)
- Scientific career
- Fields: Theoretical physics Nuclear physics
- Institutions: Lawrence Berkeley National Laboratory, University of California, Berkeley

Władysław J. (Wladek) Świątecki (22 April 1926 – 30 September 2009) was a Polish theoretical and nuclear physicist. He was one of the first proponents of the island of stability for superheavy elements, showing that it appears in a mass formula influenced by the presence of closed nuclear shells; he is also known for several other contributions in nuclear structure research.

== Biography ==
Świątecki was born in Paris on 22 April 1926. His father, also named Władysław Świątecki, was an inventor and aeronautical engineer. Świątecki lived in Poland with his family until September 1939, when they escaped to France following the invasion of Poland and start of World War II, only to flee again to England in May 1940.

Świątecki continued his education in England. In 1945 and 1946 respectively, Świątecki completed Bachelor's degrees in physics and mathematics. In 1950, under the guidance of Rudolf Peierls, he received his Ph.D. in physics for his thesis entitled "The Surface Energy of Nuclei".

Having completed his education, Świątecki went on to work in various nuclear physics laboratories in Scandinavia before settling at the Lawrence Berkeley National Laboratory in 1957. He worked at the Niels Bohr Institute in Copenhagen for three years, then spent another three in Uppsala at the Gustav Werner Institute, and finally one year at the University of Aarhus. At Berkeley, Świątecki did extensive work in nuclear physics, and continued to do so even after his formal retirement in 1991.

Świątecki died peacefully in his home on 30 September 2009 from pancreatic cancer. He has 5 children and 8 grandchildren.

== Research ==
Świątecki was a pioneer in several areas of nuclear physics, including studies of nuclear fission of superheavy elements, the nuclear shell model, and the development of a semi-empirical mass formula. Although the original formulation of the nuclear shell model predates Świątecki, he and Gertrude Scharff-Goldhaber from Brookhaven National Laboratory calculated that "magic numbers" of protons and neutrons may exist for some superheavy elements and confer additional stability, whose estimated half-lives ranged from minutes to millions of years. In 1966, Świątecki, along with William Myers and Heiner Meldner, developed a model that revealed an increase in fission barrier height for nuclei centered around atomic number 114, suggesting the possibility of stabilizing shell effects in that region. Although several other such regions were proposed, including one around element 126 as early as 1957, Świątecki and Myers determined that the Coulomb force would shift the proton shell closure to Z = 114. With this work, the theory of an "island of stability" for superheavy nuclides gained popularity, and motivated experiments seeking such nuclides in subsequent decades.

In addition to his prediction of the island of stability, Świątecki's contributions led to further developments in the nuclear shell model, most notably the macroscopic-microscopic method for calculating various properties of nuclei and extrapolating to unknown nuclei. The 1994 Thomas-Fermi model of Myers and Świątecki offered several new developments, namely a solution to an anomaly in nuclear curvature.

Świątecki also did some research in chaos theory and its implications for nuclear dynamics.

== Honors and awards ==
In 1973, Świątecki became a member of the Royal Danish Academy of Sciences and Letters. He was also a member of the Polish Academy of Arts and Sciences. In recognition for his work, he won the 1990 Marian Smoluchowski Medal of the Polish Physical Society (for which he was a laureate in 1989), and received an honorary degree from the Jagiellonian University in Kraków in 2000.

== See also ==
- Dmitri Ivanenko
- J. Hans D. Jensen
- Maria Goeppert Mayer
- Yuri Oganessian
- Glenn T. Seaborg
