= Władysław Świątecki (inventor) =

Polish inventor and airman (1895–1944)

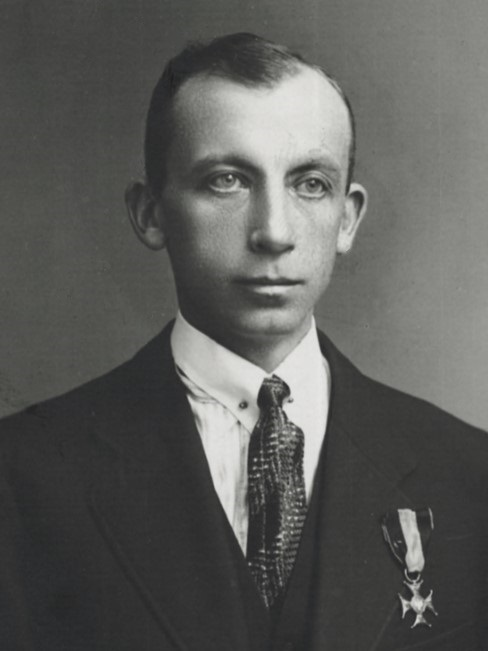
- Świątecki, ca. 1933
- Born: 20 December 1895; Warsaw, Congress Poland
- Died: 28 April 1944 (aged 48); Edinburgh, United Kingdom
- Education: Peter the Great St. Petersburg Polytechnic University
- Occupations: airman, engineer, inventor
- Known for: Swiatecki bomb slip
- Awards: Virtuti Militari

Władysław J. Świątecki (20 December 1895 – 28 April 1944) was a Polish inventor and airman of the Polish Air Force. He is known for designing the Swiatecki bomb slip. In 1924, he was awarded Poland's highest military decoration, the Order of Virtuti Militari.

== Biography ==
=== Early life ===
Świątecki was born 1895 in Russian Poland. His father, Jan Świątecki, was a General Practitioner in St Petersburg, and his mother was Josefa Papiewska. He flew in the War of Liberation for Poland 1918 - 1920. Decorated with the order Virtuti Militari, a high Polish decoration for bravery.

=== Career ===
In 1926, Świątecki joined the Institute of Aviation Technology Research in Warsaw. He invented the slip bomb device, which he patented in the same year. The device was planned for the Karas light bomber and for Łoś bomber but not used, though the device was handed over to the Polish Air Force before the war and used by other European air forces. Escaped from Poland in 1939 through Hungary, Yugoslavia and Italy to France (Paris) where he worked as engineer in military industry. Then, when France collapsed in June 1940, he escaped again, with his family, travelling to North Africa and then by ship to England. There he demonstrated his device to the Ministry of Aircraft Production. He went on to serve in the Royal Air Force as a Flight Lieutenant at Blackpool. There he used his technical skills to translate British technical documents into Polish.

The slip device was modified for use in the Lancasters of 9, 12 and 617 Squadrons of the Royal Air Force for the use of Grand Slam and Tallboy giant aerial bombs. The Boeing B-29 was modified to carry Grand Slam and Tallboy and the giant 42000 lb T-12 bomb, the slip device (The D-9 carrier) was a modification of the Swiatecki bomb slip. These weapons were the most successful air dropped bombs before the atomic bomb. In Project Harken and Project Ruby the Swiatecki devices performed flawlessly.

=== Death and afterward ===
Died on 28 April 1944 at the Paderewski Hospital, Edinburgh, of kidney failure and is buried in Edinburgh.

His slip device was the subject of debate at the Royal Commission on Awards to Inventors from 1946 to 1955. The Ministry claimed the device was invented at the Royal Aircraft Establishment, Farnborough and developed by Vickers Armstrongs. The family received an ex gratia award of £350. The basis of the family claim was a letter written to the Ministry of Aircraft Production by Władysław Świątecki in 1944, just before he died. On a visit to Farnborough he noticed that Lancaster aircraft were being fitted with his bomb slip device. In his letter he claimed patent infringement which the Ministry denied. The family claim was put forward by his sons, the eldest son also called Władysław Świątecki and Tad Świątecki. The former was an eminent physicist who died in 2009.

== Bibliography ==
- (Polish) Jerzy B. Cynk "Samolot bombowy PZL P-37 Łoś" (Monography about Łoś bomber) Wydawnictwa Komunikacji i Łączności, Warsaw 1990. ISBN 83-206-0836-8
- (Polish) Jerzy B. Cynk, "Tajemnica wyrzutników Świąteckiego", "Skrzydlata Polska" nr. 5/6, 1973
- Modelski Tadeusz (1986). The Polish Contribution to The Ultimate Allied Victory in The Second World War
- Transactions of the Royal Commission on Awards to Inventors 1946 - 1955 LONDON ND, Air Pictorial, September 1964
- Gerald Pawle The Secret War, Harrap-London 1956
- N. Kemp The Devices of War, London 1956
- Cynk, Jerzy B. Polish Aircraft, 1893-1939. London: Putnam & Company Ltd., 1971. ISBN 0-370-00085-4
- Cynk, Jerzy B. The P.Z.L. P-23 Karas (Aircraft in Profile number 104). Leatherhead, Surrey, UK: Profile Publications, 1966
- Project 1-46-7 Anglo American Bomb Tests Project Ruby V 68319 31 October 1946

== Sources ==
- The Devices of War N. Kemp, London 1956: Project 1-46-7 Anglo American Bomb Tests Project Ruby V 68319 31 October 1946: The Secret War, Gerald Pawle, Harrap-London 1956, Transactions of the Royal Commission on Awards to Inventors 1946 - 1955 LONDON ND, Air Pictorial, September 1964, "The Polish Karas" J.B. Cynk
