= Lublin R-XIII =

Polish military plane (1932–1940s)

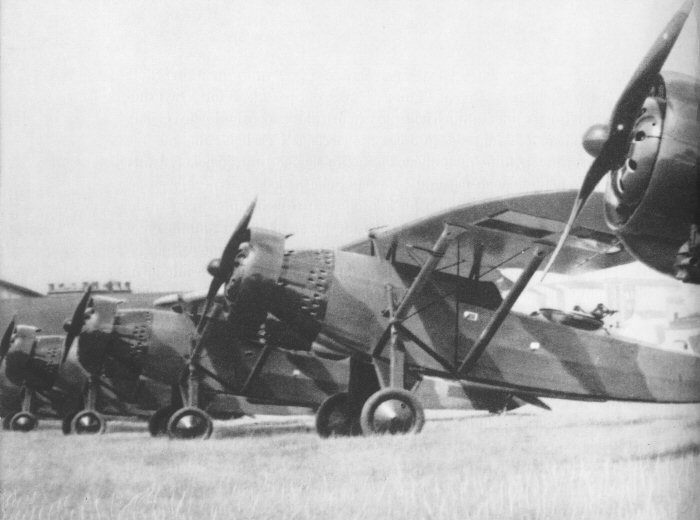
- Lublin R-XIIID

General information
- Type: Army-cooperation plane
- Manufacturer: Plage i Laśkiewicz, LWS
- Primary users: Polish Air Force Royal Romanian Air Force
- Number built: 273

History
- Manufactured: 1932-1938
- Introduction date: 1932
- First flight: 1931
- Retired: 1940s (Romania)

The Lublin R-XIII was the Polish army cooperation plane (observation and liaison plane), designed in the early-1930s in the Plage i Laśkiewicz factory in Lublin. It was the main army cooperation plane in the Invasion of Poland. Its variant Lublin R-XIV was a military trainer aircraft.

== Design and development ==
In 1927, the Polish aviation authorities announced a contest for an army-cooperation plane (in Polish: samolot towarzyszący, literally: "accompanying plane"). In Polish doctrine it was a close reconnaissance, observation and liaison aircraft, operating from casual airfields, providing big Army land units with information about the enemy. The PZL state factory proposed the PZL Ł-2, built in a series of 25 aircraft, while private factory Plage i Laśkiewicz in Lublin proposed the Lublin R-X, designed by Jerzy Rudlicki. It was flown on February 1, 1929. Five aircraft were built for the Air Force as R-Xa, and one was built as a long-distance sports plane. The third competitor was the PWS-5t2.

The contest was won by the R-Xa, having the shortest take-off and landing, and good performance, but the factory was ordered to develop design further. At that time, Rudlicki was working upon an unarmed trainer aircraft R-XIV and an observation aircraft R-XV. Both were new designs, basing upon the R-X construction. Number XIII was initially omitted in designations as "unlucky". In February 1930, the Polish Air Force ordered 15 of R-XIV. The first serial plane was built in June 1930, without an earlier prototype, and all were delivered by July 1931. The R-XIV was a two-seater, parasol wing aircraft, with a 220 hp radial engine and fixed landing gear. The crewman sat in open cabs in tandem. The R-XV was not ordered, but the Air Force demanded instead, that two R-XIV should be armed with an observer's machine gun, for testing. Thus armed, the R-XIV, fitted also with other minor modifications, most notably a changed shape of a tail fin, became the first prototype of the army-cooperation plane, that eventually received a designation Lublin R-XIII. One more prototype was newly built (no. 56.1).

On July 21, 1931, 50 aircraft R-XIII were ordered. The first couple of aircraft were designated R-XIIIA, and were distinguished by flat fuselage top. They were superseded by improved R-XIIIB variant, with oval fuselage top, newer machine gun ring mounting, and longer ailerons. R-XIIIA were later converted to R-XIIIB standard, and 49 were made in total (numbers 56.2 to 56.50). The first serial R-XIII was built on June 7, 1932. By March 11, 1933, all were given to the Air Force. In older sources, numbers of 30 R-XIIIA and 20 R-XIIIB could be found.

In 1932, next 170 aircraft were ordered. 48 were built in R-XIIIC variant with minor modifications, then 95 were built in a most numerous R-XIIID variant. It introduced visible changes, like a Townend ring on a radial engine, and a new engine cowling. It also had new type of a machine gun ring mounting. The first R-XIIID was tested in February, 1933. All aircraft were given to the Air Force by March 2, 1935. During repairs, older models A, B and C were modified to R-XIIID standard as well.

In 1933, Jerzy Rudlicki proposed a new design R-XXI, for a new contest for R-XIII successor, but it was not accepted (the contest was won by the RWD-14 Czapla). However, some of R-XXI features, like higher and rounded in cross-section fuselage and changed shape of a tail fin, were found in latest R-XIII variants. Single prototype of the R-XIIIE was built in 1934, fitted with a stronger 360 hp engine Gnome-Rhone 7K Titan, but it was not produced. Another variant R-XIIIF introduced new, Polish-designed 340 hp engine Skoda G-1620A Mors-I. It had no Townend ring on cylinders of the radial engine. After one prototype (no. 56.101), a series of 50 R-XIIIF were ordered in 1934. After seven aircraft had been delivered, the Polish aviation authorities refused to buy nearly completed further 18 aircraft, planning to nationalize all aviation industry in Poland. As a result, Plage i Laśkiewicz factory went bankrupt in late 1935, and it was next nationalized under a name LWS (Lubelska Wytwórnia Samolotów - Lublin Aircraft Works). Then, 18 R-XIIIF, bought by scrap price, were completed, and next series of 32 was built. All R-XIIIF were delivered to the Air Force by 1938. However, only 26 of them were completed with Mors engines (and mostly used for training or staff liaison), while 32 had standard 220 hp Wright engines, lowering their performance to R-XIIID level.

In 1931, one R-XIV was tested on floats, as a seaplane. Since tests came out well, the Polish Navy designated it R-XIII bis/hydro and ordered the next three (nos. 700-703). In 1933, the Navy ordered 10 R-XIII ter/hydro, which was a seaplane variant of R-XIIID (nos. 704-713). Finally, in 1934 the Navy bought 6 R-XIIIG seaplanes, differing in details from a previous variant - among others, a metal propeller (nos. 714-720). They were delivered by April 1935. All variants could also be easily converted to wheeled landing gear.

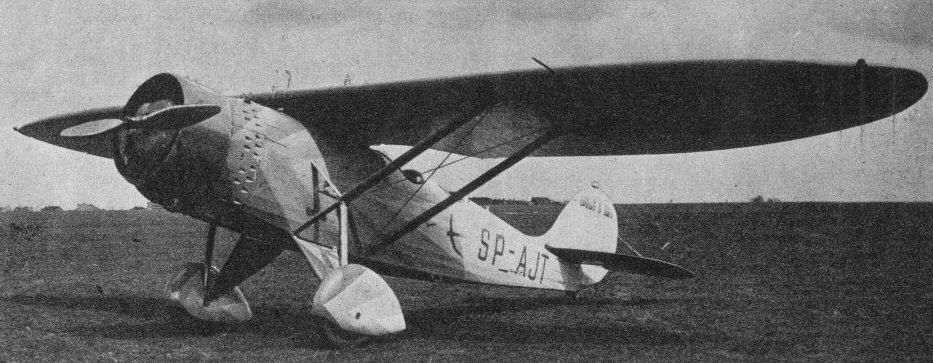
Lublin R-XIIIDr

In 1933, one R-XIIIB was converted to a long-distance sport plane R-XIIIDr, named Błękitny Ptak (the Blue Bird), meant for a flight to Australia, however it was crashed in 1935 in Siam by Stanisław Karpiński. Several aircraft were converted to civilian sport ones, used in Polish Aero Clubs.

12 R-XIII's were converted to blind flying trainers R-XIIIt in 1934, with higher closed trainee cab. Some were converted to simple liaison aircraft, removing armament and mounting a windscreen in the second cab. Several R-XIII were used to tow gliders, using a special frame with a hook, attached to a fuselage.

The R-XIII prototype was converted in 1932 to an experimental variant R-XIX, with V-tail of Rudlicki's design, but it was not accepted by the authorities, despite it had better field of machine gun fire.

In total, 15 R-XIV and 273 R-XIII were built, including 20 seaplanes.

== Combat use ==
In the early 1930s the R-XIII was quite a successful plane for its purpose. It had a very short take-off (68 m for R-XIIIA) and landing, enabling it to operate from fields and meadows. However, only some of R-XIIIs were equipped with a radio and a camera, which lowered their usefulness. In 1932-1936 they were used in three-aircraft liaison platoons, being a basic Polish army-cooperation plane. In 1937 they were formed into army-cooperation escadres (eskadra towarzysząca), in 1939 reformed into observation escadres (eskadra obserwacyjna). Only in 1939, part of R-XIII were replaced by the RWD-14b Czapla, which was not much more modern. A planned replacement was a modern LWS-3 Mewa, but it was not introduced due to war outbreak.

On the eve of the Invasion of Poland in 1939, the Polish Air Force had about 150 R-XIII. Of them, 49 were in combat units, 30 in reserve, about 30 in training units and about 40 in repairs. In combat units, R-XIII were used in 7 observation escadres (out of 12): numbers 16, 26, 36, 43, 46, 56 and 66. Each escadre had 7 aircraft. The 16th Escadre was in C-in-C reserve, while the others were distributed among the field Armies. The R-XIII was no match for any of the Luftwaffe fighters, bombers or even reconnaissance aircraft, being much slower, and armed with only one machine gun, but they were actively used for close reconnaissance and liaison tasks.

About 40 R-XIII from combat units were destroyed during the campaign, but only part of those were shot down by the German aircraft or flak. During the campaign, 9 aircraft were given to observation escadres as replenishment. Some planes were also used in a wartime improvised units in air bases. About 10 combat aircraft and 7 from other units were withdrawn to Romania. A number of aircraft were bombed by the Germans in air bases or burned by withdrawing Poles. None have survived to today.

In the Naval Air Squadron, 11 R-XIIIter and R-XIIIG floatplanes were used in 1939. The aircraft No. 714 was sent on September 7 at night to search for Schleswig-Holstein battleship in Danzig, but did not find it there. The crew claimed to have bombed civilian victory parade in Danzig, celebrating capturing of Westerplatte instead, but there has been no confirmation of such attack found in German sources. On September 8 all planes were bombed, while stationed on the sea near Hel on the Hel Peninsula.

== Variants ==
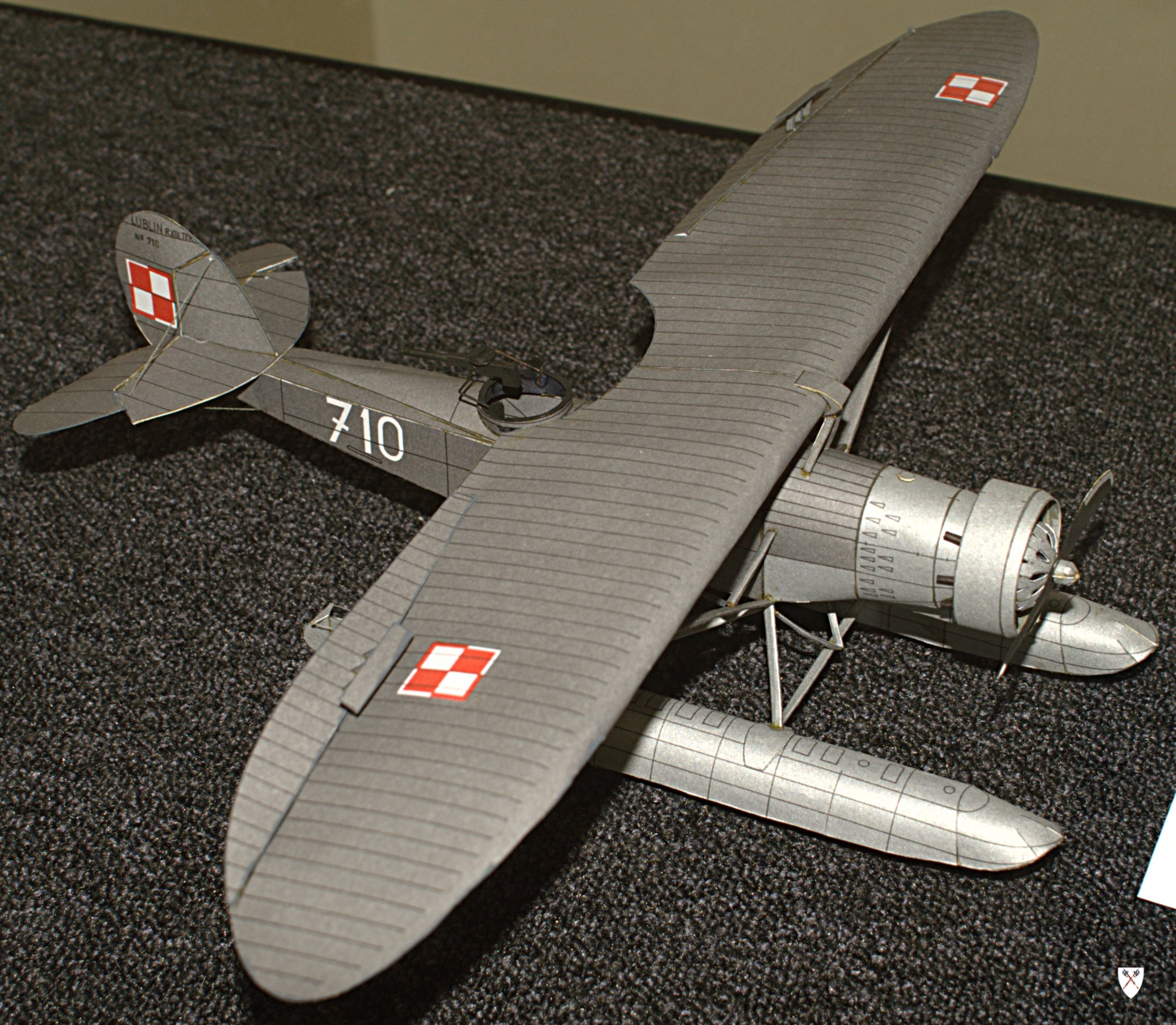
Lublin R-XIII ter/hydro

- R-XIII prototype (no. 56.1)
- R-XIII second prototype (conversion of R-XIV, no. 54.15)
- R-XIIIA - army cooperation aircraft from 1931, then converted to R-XIIIB
- R-XIIIB - army cooperation aircraft, 49 produced or converted from 1931 (nos 56.2-56.50)
- R-XIIIC - army cooperation aircraft, 48 produced from 1933 (nos. 56.52-56.99)
- R-XIIID - standard variant of army cooperation aircraft, 95 produced from 1933 (nos 56.102-56.196)
- R-XIIIE - one prototype of 1934 with 360 hp Gnome-Rhone 7K Titan engine (no. 56.100)
- R-XIIIF - army cooperation aircraft with modified fuselage, part with 340 hp Skoda G-1620A Mors-I engine, 58 produced from 1934 (nos. 56.101, 58.01-58.57)
- R-XIII bis/hydro - seaplane, 4 produced from 1931 (nos. 700-703)
- R-XIII ter/hydro - seaplane, 10 produced from 1934 (nos. 704-713)
- R-XIIIG - seaplane, 6 produced from 1934 (nos. 714-720)
- R-XIIIDr - long-distance sport conversion, 1 made (no. 56.51)
- R-XIIIt - trainer conversion, at least 12 made
- R-XIV - trainer, 15 produced from 1930 (nos. 54.1-54.15)
- R-XV - army cooperation variant of R-XIV, not built
- R-XIX - one prototype with V-tail of 1932 (no. 56.1)
- R-XXIII - This was the original designation of the R-XIIIDr.

== Description ==
Mixed construction (steel and wood) monoplane, conventional in layout, with braced high wings, canvas and plywood covered (front part of fuselage was metal covered). Conventional fixed landing gear, with a tailskid. Crew of two, sitting in tandem in an open cockpit, with twin controls. The observer had a 7.92 mm Vickers machine gun on a ring mounting (rarely, 2 machine guns). A 9-cylinder air-cooled radial engine Wright Whirlwind J-5 (produced in Poland) with 162 kW (220 hp) nominal power and 176 kW (240 hp) take-off power (on 22 aircraft R-XIIIF, 250 kW (340 hp) engine Skoda G-1620A Mors-I). Two-blade wooden or metal propeller. Fuel tank 200 liters in the fuselage, could be dropped in case of fire emergency (R-XIV - 135 liter tank).

== Operators ==
Poland

- Polish Air Force
- Polish Navy

Romania

- Royal Romanian Air Force

== Specification (R-XIIIB) ==
Data from Cynk, 1971

General characteristics

- Crew: Two, pilot and observer
- Length: 8.2 m (26 ft 11 in)
- Wingspan: 13.25 m (43 ft 6 in)
- Height: 2.76 m (9 ft 1 in)
- Wing area: 24.5 m^{2} (264 sq ft)
- Empty weight: 891 kg (1,964 lb) equipped
- Gross weight: 1,330 kg (2,932 lb)
- Fuel capacity: 200 L (44 imp gal; 53 US gal)
- Powerplant: 1 × Wright Whirlwind J-5 9-cylinder radial engine, 160 kW (220 hp)
- Propellers: 2-bladed Somanski fixed pitch, wooden

Performance

- Maximum speed: 177 km/h (110 mph, 96 kn) at sea level
- Range: 600 km (370 mi, 320 nmi)
- Service ceiling: 4,100 m (13,500 ft)
- Time to altitude: 22 min 35 s to 3,000 m (9,800 ft)
- Take-off distance: 68 m (223 ft)

Armament

- Guns: 1× 7.7 mm (0.303 in) machine gun on Scarff ring in rear cockpit

== See also ==
Related development:

- Lublin R-X
- Lublin R-XXI

Comparable aircraft:

- Heinkel He 46
- Henschel Hs 126
- Breguet 270
- Potez 390
