= Plage i Laśkiewicz =

Polish aerospace manufacturer

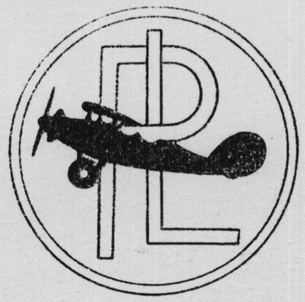
- Logo used from 1930 to 1935
- Formerly: Fabryka Wyrobów Miedziowych
- Industry: Aerospace
- Founded: 1860
- Defunct: 1935
- Fate: Nationalized
- Successor: Lubelska Wytwórnia Samolotów
- Headquarters: Lublin, Poland
- Key people: Jerzy Rudlicki

Plage i Laśkiewicz (Plage & Laśkiewicz) was the first Polish aerospace manufacturer, located in Lublin and manufacturing aircraft under Lublin name. Full name was: Zakłady Mechaniczne E. Plage i T. Laśkiewicz – Mechanical Works E. Plage & T. Laśkiewicz. The factory produced aircraft between 1920 and 1935, when it was nationalized as the Lubelska Wytwórnia Samolotów.

== History ==
=== Beginnings and license production ===
The company was founded in 1860 as Fabryka Wyrobów Miedziowych, a mechanical workshop specializing in the manufacture of copper products. However, by 1919 it had been renamed Plage i Laśkiewicz and that year it started producing aircraft. On February 17, 1920, the Polish government ordered a licence production of Italian fighters Ansaldo A.1 Balilla and light bombers Ansaldo A.300 in Plage & Laśkiewicz. The first Polish A.300 was flown on June 14, 1921. However, due to the lack of experience, the quality of produced aircraft was low, and there were numerous crashes. As a result, the order was limited to 70 A.300 and 50 A.1 only, produced by 1924.

Despite its unsuccessful beginning the factory gained experience, and there were no major problems with future aircraft series. In 1924, the Polish government ordered a licence production of French light bombers Potez XV, and in 1925–1926, there were built 100 of them in Plage & Laśkiewicz. In 1928–1931 the works produced 150 of more modern Potez 25. In 1929–1930 the works produced 11 passenger planes Fokker F-VIIb/3m on Fokker licence, and 20 of own Fokker F-VIIb/3m bomber modification.

=== Own designs ===
In the mid-1920s the factory management was changed, and Jerzy Rudlicki became lead designer. Then, apart from licence production, the plant started to produce its own aircraft, under the name Lublin, designated "R" for Rudlicki.

The first own design was a biplane bomber Lublin R-VIII, flown in 1928. Six were produced by 1930, three of them were later converted to seaplanes and used in the Polish naval aviation until 1939. Prototype light passenger planes: biplane R-IX, and high-wing R-XI were not ordered by the Polish Airlines. Also sport high-wing plane Lublin R-XII was not produced in series.

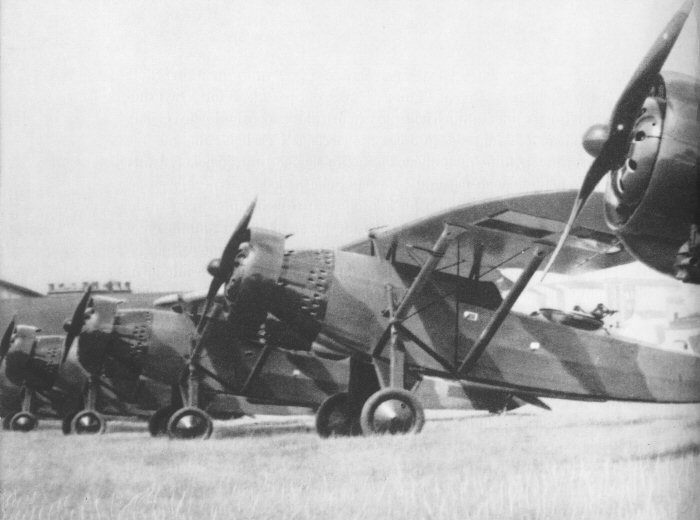
Lublin R-XIIID

Another design was a parasol wing liaison aircraft Lublin R-X, flown in 1929. It won a contest for a Polish Air Force liaison plane, but only 7 were produced. Instead, Rudlicki developed it further and designed trainer aircraft R-XIV and an army liaison plane Lublin R-XIII, which became Poland's main army liaison aircraft (and the only mass-produced Lublin). 15 of R-XIV were built in 1930–31, and 223 of R-XIII were built in 1932–1935 (further 50 after nationalization). Its experimental variant R-XIX introduced the V-tail, invented by Rudlicki.

The light passenger plane Lublin R-XVI of 1932 was not ordered by the airlines, but six were produced as air ambulance R-XVIb. The last construction was a two-engine torpedo seaplane Lublin R-XX, flown in 1935, but it was not produced either. Apart from these, some other designs did not reach prototype stage.

In 1924–1933 the works also produced car bodies, mainly for Somua (imported) and Ursus buses, but also for luxury imported cars and the Ralf-Stetysz cars.

Due to plans of Polish aviation authorities (mainly Ludomił Rayski) to gather all aviation industry in state-owned factories, Plage & Laśkiewicz works were forced to bankruptcy. After delivering seven of the ordered 50 R-XIIIF aircraft in late 1935, the Polish Ministry of War broke the contract under a pretext. As a result, the factory went bankrupt and then was nationalized under the name LWS (Lubelska Wytwórnia Samolotów – Lublin Aircraft Works). Then, 18 almost ready R-XIIIF, bought by scrap price, were completed, and the next series of 32 was built.

== Aircraft ==
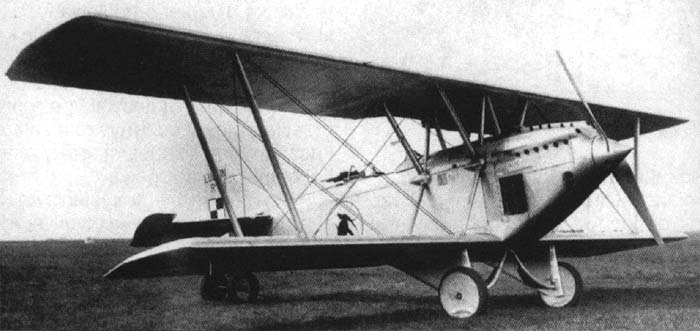
R-VIII

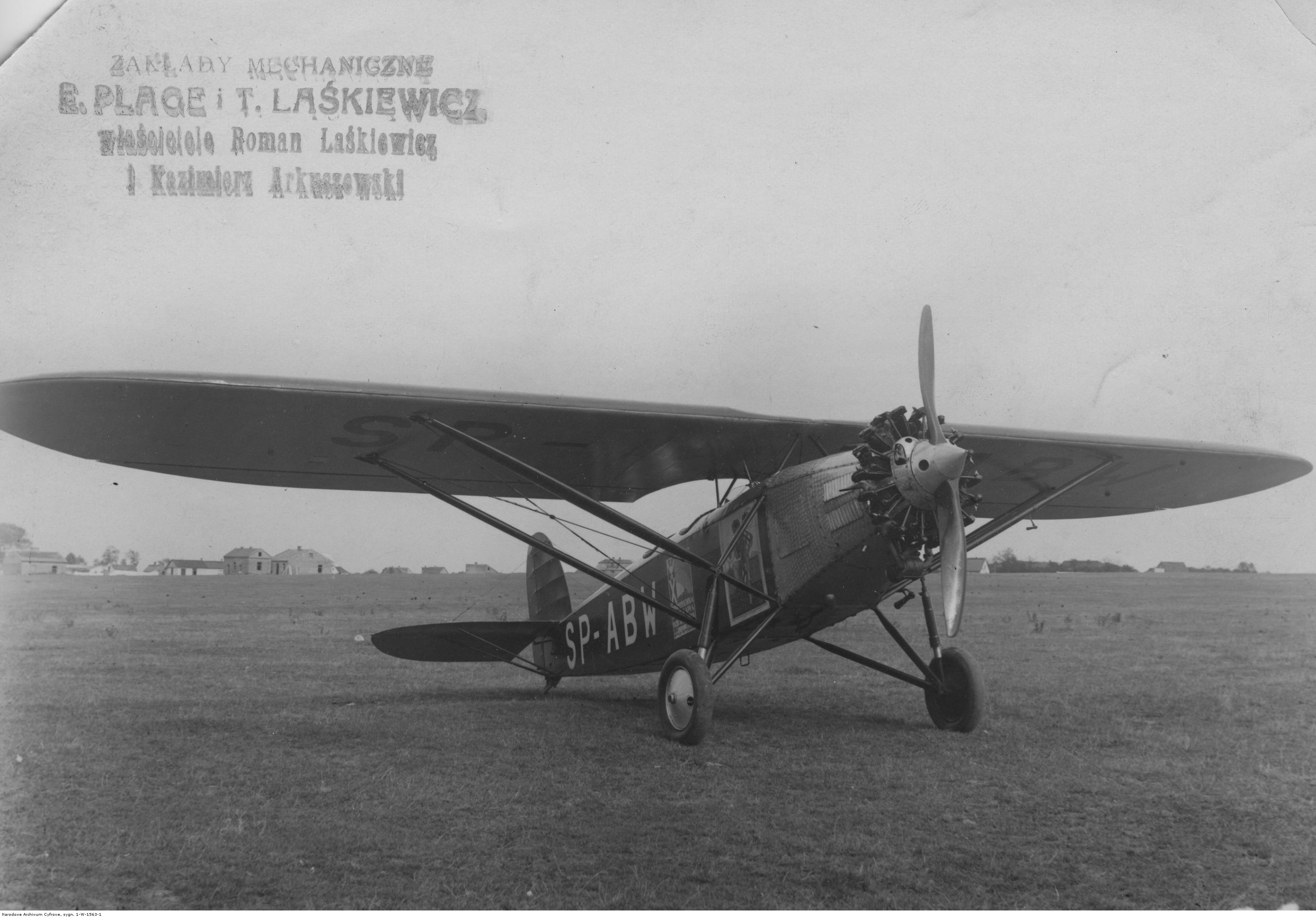
R-X

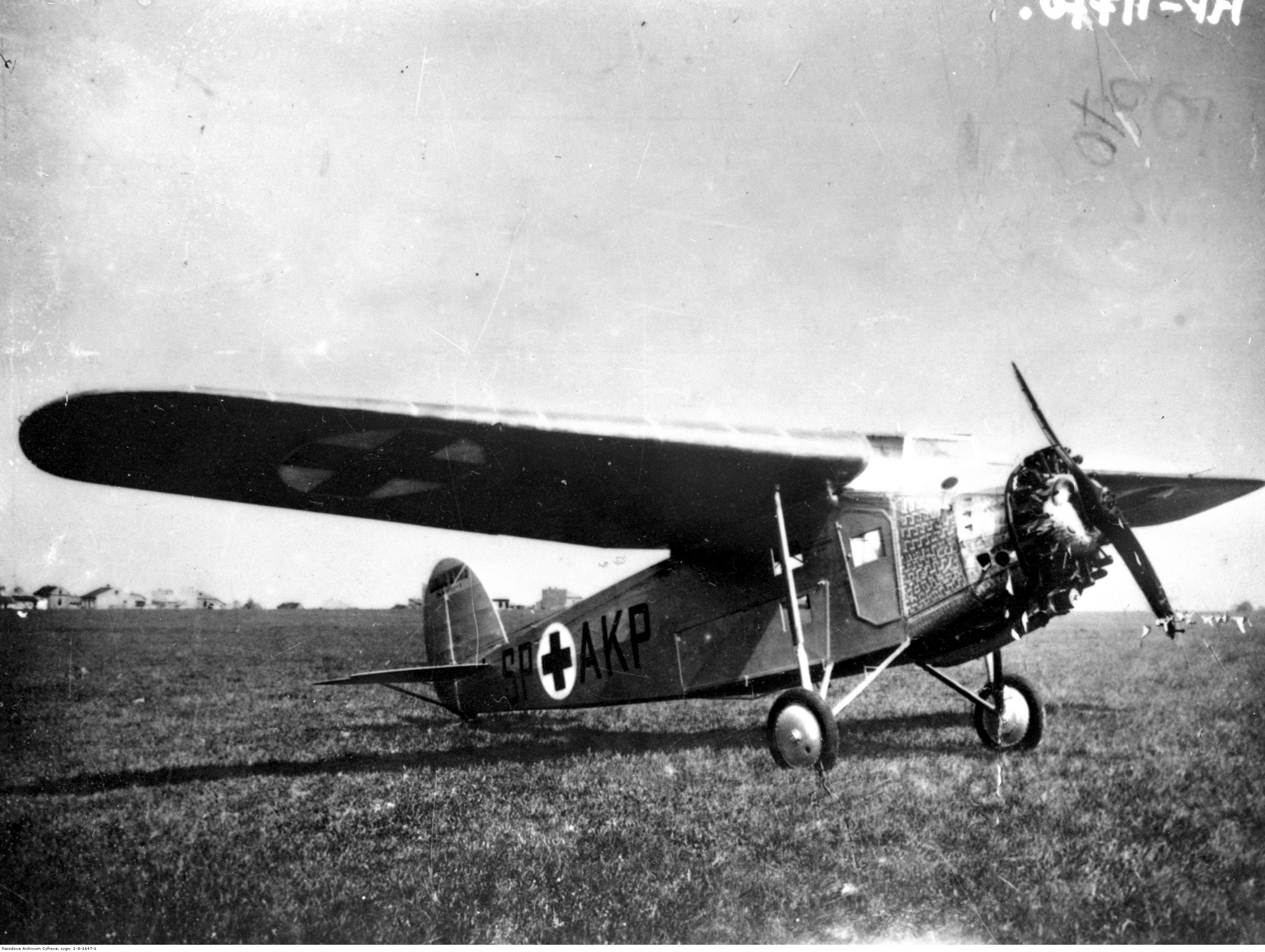
R-XVI

Model name	First flight	Number built	Type
Plage i Laśkiewicz A.1	1921	57	License built single engine biplane fighter
Plage i Laśkiewicz A.300	1921	79	License built single engine biplane reconnaissance airplane
Plage i Laśkiewicz XV		100	License built single engine biplane light bomber
Plage i Laśkiewicz XXV		150	License built single engine biplane light bomber
Plage i Laśkiewicz F.VII/m3		11	License built three engine monoplane airliner
Plage i Laśkiewicz F.VII/m3W		20	License built three engine monoplane bomber
Lublin R-VII	N/A	0	
Lublin R-VIII	1928	6	Single engine biplane light bomber
Lublin R-IX	1929	1	Single engine biplane airliner
Lublin R-X	1929	7	Single engine monoplane liaison airplane
Lublin R-XI	1930	1	Single engine monoplane airliner
Lublin R-XII	1930	1	Single engine monoplane sport airplane
Lublin R-XIII	1931	273	Single engine monoplane liaison airplane
Lublin R-XIV	1930	15	Single engine monoplane trainer
Lublin R-XV	N/A	0	Single engine monoplane observation airplane
Lublin R-XVI	1932	7	Single engine monoplane ambulance airplane
Lublin R-XVII	N/A	0	Single engine biplane experimental airplane
Lublin R-XVIII	N/A	0	Three engine biplane heavy bomber
Lublin R-XIX		1	Single engine monoplane experimental airplane
Lublin R-XX	1935	1	Two engine monoplane torpedo bomber seaplane
Lublin R-XXI	N/A	0	Single engine monoplane liaison airplane
Lublin R-XXII	N/A	0	Single engine biplane torpedo bomber seaplane
