= LWS-6 Żubr =

Polish medium bomber of WW2

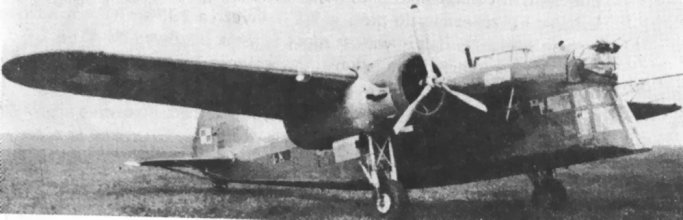
- PZL.30 Żubr

General information
- Type: Medium bomber
- Manufacturer: LWS
- Primary users: Polish Air Force Luftwaffe; Soviet Air Forces
- Number built: 17

History
- Manufactured: 1938
- Introduction date: 1938
- First flight: March 1936
- Retired: 1940s

The LWS-6 Żubr (PZL.30, wisent) was a twin-engined medium bomber designed and produced by the Polish aircraft manufacturer LWS. It was only produced in limited numbers and was used for training purposes as it proved to be inferior to the contemporary PZL.37 Łoś medium bomber.

The LWS-6 was originally designed as a 12-passenger airliner in the early 1930s, but was reconfigured into a bomber instead. In March 1936, the first prototype, designated PZL.30 (or PZL.30BI), performed its maiden flight. The aircraft was accepted for a limited production run by the LWS state factory in Lublin for the Polish Air Force. During 1937, work commenced on a floatplane torpedo bomber variant, designated the LWS-5, for the Polish Navy, but work on the prototype was abandoned following setbacks. Export sales were also sought, the Romanian Air Force were reportedly considering buying up to 24 aircraft, however, following the loss of one of the prototypes on 7 November 1936 due to a mid-air structural failure, Romania ordered the rival PZL.37 Łoś instead.

In 1938 the LWS-6 was introduced to service with the Polish Air Force, which immediately assigned the type to its training units rather than frontline squadrons. Even so, its service life would be relatively brief due to the outbreak of the Second World War in September 1939. Many aircraft were destroyed on the ground, none would be used in combat against Nazi Germany. Several would be captured by both the Soviet Union and Germany, leading to the type being used in secondary roles, such as training and communication, by the Luftwaffe and the Soviet Air Forces. None would survive the conflict.

== Development ==
=== Origins ===
Work on what would become the LWS-6 originally started in 1932 as the PZL.30, a 12-passenger airliner. It had been conceived of, and primarily developed by, the Polish aeronautical engineer Zbysław Ciołkosz shortly after having joined the aircraft manufacturer PZL. It had been hoped that the Polish national flag carrier Polskie Linje Lotnicze LOT would procure the PZL.30, particularly as it had been seeking a replacement to its aging Fokker F.VII fleet at that time. While the airline did not outwardly indicate interest in the project, Polish aviation authorities opted to sponsor its development in the hope that LOT would change its mind as it neared completion. Such hopes were in vain, however, as in 1935, LOT opted to purchase American-built Douglas DC-2 airliners instead.

Another avenue for the project had presented itself in the form of an official requirement for a new medium bomber for the Polish Air Force; Ciołkosz himself proposed producing a bomber derivative of his airliner project. This derivative attracted favourable attention not only from industry but also Polish Air Force officers; in late 1933, a special commission selected the design study for further investigation over several rival proposals. Accordingly, greater resources were promptly directed towards the project. As the detailed design took form, it became clear that the performance of the PZL.30 was unlikely to match that of a more advanced alternative medium bomber already in development at that time, the PZL.37 Łoś. However, the Department of Aeronautics identified that, as a result of the substantial differences between the Łoś and preceding aircraft, operational conversion would require extensive training, a capacity in which a more affordable auxiliary bomber would likely play a valuable role. Continuing the PZL.30's development also enabled the project to act as a fallback option in the eventuality that the more advanced bomber encountered insurmountable technical issues. Thus, the company was instructed to proceed with constructing a single prototype. The design showed influence by French bombers, with spacious flat-sided fuselage with rich glazing.

During March 1936, the first prototype of PZL.30, designated PZL.30BI, performed its maiden flight; it was piloted by the Polish test pilot Bolesław Orliński. The occasion, which made the aircraft the first Polish twin engined bomber to take flight, occurred only three months prior to the first flight of the prototype Łoś. The manufacturer's trials were completed by mid-1936, after which the prototype was dispatched to conduct certification and utilisation trials. While these were reportedly trouble-free, the aircraft continue to demonstrate unimpressive performance throughout; it was praised for its spacious interior amongst other things. Despite the PZL.30's development having occurred within virtually the same timeframe as the PZL.37, the performance of the PZL.30 was noticeably inferior to its counterpart, being both slower and possessing a considerably smaller bomb load than the Łoś, yet incurring a similar per unit cost to produce.

The PZL.30 prototype had been initially powered by a pair of American Pratt & Whitney Wasp Junior radial engines, each capable of producing 420 hp. At the urging of the Department of Aeronautics, the company refitted the aircraft with the more powerful Bristol Pegasus VIII radial engines, sourced from the United Kingdom. To reflect this change, which became a condition for the awarding of a production contract, the prototype was redesignated as the PZL.30BII. It was flown in September 1936. The aircraft was accepted for a limited production run by the LWS state factory in Lublin, for which Ciołkosz was appointed the technical director and project lead. In older publications there could be found a designation LWS-4, but it does not appear in any documents and the aircraft's correct designation was LWS-6.

=== Design changes ===
It was planned to produce 16 aircraft for the Polish Air Force, with the designation: LWS-6 Żubr. The Żubr was given a military code number 71 and the series was to have factory numbers 71.1 to 71.17, but the aircraft were given different code numbers eventually due to secrecy. The production aircraft incorporated further changes, such as a new means of undercarriage retraction; instead of the uncommon arrangement of retracting into the fuselage sides, a more conventional approach of retracting into the engine nacelles was implemented.

Development was hit by the loss of a prototype on 7 November 1936, having crashed at Michałowice shortly following a mid-air structural failure during a demonstration flight. Comprehensive static testing and other investigative techniques were applied to the design to identify the cause, which was determined to have been the de-lamination of the wing's plywood skin. Substantial lobbying was also employed, as the aircraft was LWS's only active project at the time and its cancellation would have had severe consequences for the company. To remedy the issue, the wing was redesigned with greater reinforcement, but this measure increased the aircraft's overall weight, which in turn meant that the LWS-6 had a smaller bomb load than expected while other performance areas were also hampered. The factory proposed to develop new steel construction wing, 300 kg lighter, but it was not implemented.

During 1937, the factory proposed to build a floatplane torpedo bomber variant, designated the LWS-5, instead of pursuing development of the LWS-1 (R-XXA) that had been designed by Jerzy Rudlicki. It was supposed to be fitted with two Short floats of the Lublin R-XX prototype. Initially, the Polish Navy exhibited interest in the proposal, and work on the LWS-1 was cancelled despite the progress made; however, numerous problems were encountered in the LWS-5's development, leading to work on the prototype being canceled as well. It was evident that the underpowered LWS-5 could not carry an effective offensive load. (Note: The factory continued design work on the Żubr, and, during 1939, developed a lighter wing of steel construction and a refined fuselage, but these changes were not incorporated due to the outbreak of the Second World War.)

As one part of several measures explored to improve the aircraft's performance, a modified prototype was produced that featured a double tail fin; it conducted an initial flight near the end of 1937. However, the definitive model that would attain quantity production would only ever use a single tail fin configuration, albeit enlarged from earlier counterparts. During 1938, a series of 15 aircraft were constructed, while deliveries to the Polish Air Force commenced in early 1939.

Aside from the Polish Air Force, the Romanian Air Force showed an interest in the Żubr prototype during 1936 and, at one point, was reportedly considering the purchase of up to 24 aircraft that could have been powered by French-supplied engines. Following the fatal loss of the Pegasus-powered prototype on 7 November 1936, which had resulted the deaths of all on board, including two Romanian officers, Romania placed an order for the rival PZL.37 Łoś instead. (Note: The factory published a cover-up story, that the crash was caused by one of Romanians opening the door during flight.)

== Design ==
The LWS-6 Żubr was a conventional high-wing cantilever twin-engined monoplane. It featured an unorthodox mixed construction approach, being largely composed of both metal and wood. The fuselage, which had a rectangular cross-section, was divided into two sections; the forward section had a duralumin structure while the remainder of the structure used welded tubular steel. The upper fuselage had a metallic exterior while a canvas covering was present on both the sides and the bottom. The wings were of wooden construction and had a plywood covering. The main undercarriage retracted into the engine nacelles, only the wheels themselves fully retracted, the legs remaining exposed and thus generating drag event in the retracted position; the aviation author Jerzy Cynk describes the arrangement as "crude" and of "doubtful advantage". The aircraft was powered by a pair of Bristol Pegasus VIII radial engines, that typically generated up to 670 hp (500 kW), but provide additional power for take-offs of 680 hp (520 kW). These engines drove three-bladed Hamilton Standard metal propellers. The engines were license-manufactured as PZL Pegaz 8.

The LWS-6 was operated by a crew of four: a pilot, commander-bombardier, radio operator and a rear gunner. The bombardier was accommodated in the aircraft's glazed nose, the position being provisioned with a forward-facing turret armed with twin machine guns that had a distinctive pointed "beard" directly beneath it. The pilot was seated underneath a sizable canopy in a forward position on the upper fuselage, which was also somewhat offset to the left. Full night-flying instrumentation was provided, along with direction-finding radio and detachable dual controls. The radio operator was seated inside the fuselege. In training role, additional crew member took place in the pilot's cockpit on folding seat. The rear gunner operated a semi-retractable upper dorsal turret armed with twin machine guns that elevated to a working position, along with a "trap" ventral position that operated in an identical manner. The bombload was intended to be primarily carried within an internal bomb bay on multi-storey racks; external racks were also tested for an expanded bombing capacity. The aircraft was designed to carry 1200 kg of bombs in the bomb bay (8 bombs 50 or 100 kg), under the fuselage (4 bombs 50 or 100 kg) and under wings (4 bombs 50 kg), but maximum take-off weight limited the load to 440-660 kg.

== Operational history ==
Between 1938 and 1939, a total of 15 LWS-6 bombers were delivered to the Polish Air Force. From the outset, the type was considered to be obsolete; instead of being assigned to frontline combat squadrons, the newly-delivered aircraft were allocated to training units, primarily to the 213th Training Bomber Escadrille in Małaszewicze and a training escadrille of the 1st Air Regiment. In Polish service, several shortcomings were identified on the LWS-6, such as the occasional uncommanded retraction of the undercarriage during landing. As a result, some crews would reportedly choose to fly with the undercarriage permanently locked down.

The type was exclusively used for training. Production model of the Żubr was considered safe aircraft, with good flight characteristics, and only one crashed before the war due to pilot's error, however, without fatal injuries.

During the Invasion of Poland in September 1939, no Żubrs were recorded as having been used in actual combat. They were largely grounded, being unsuitable for operations at full-loaded weight from the temporary operational landing fields commonly being used, while flying in a lightened condition would have provided virtually no payload capacity. Several aircraft were destroyed while on the ground, most of them in Małaszewicze, a fate shared with many other training aircraft of the Polish Air Force. The Germans captured several intact LWS-6s, including the twin-tailfin prototype. These aircraft were flown by the Luftwaffe, where the type was used for blind flying training until at least 1942 (among others, in Blindflugschule Schleissheim). As a result, the LWS-6 lasted longer in Luftwaffe service than it did with the Polish Air Force.

The Soviet Union also captured four aircraft during their own invasion of Poland. These were subsequently operated by the Soviet Air Forces for a time as communication aircraft.

== Operators ==
Germany

- Luftwaffe — operated captured aircraft for training purposes.

Poland

- Polish Air Force — used in non-combat roles, primarily training.

Soviet Union

- Soviet Air Force — used four captured aircraft for communication.

== Specifications (LWS-4) ==
Data from Polish Aircraft 1893–1939

General characteristics

- Crew: 4 (pilot, commander-bombardier, radio operator, rear gunner)
- Length: 15.4 m (50 ft 6 in)
- Wingspan: 18.5 m (60 ft 8 in)
- Height: 3.5 m (11 ft 6 in)
- Wing area: 49.5 m^{2} (533 sq ft)
- Empty weight: 4,788 kg (10,556 lb)
- Gross weight: 6,747 kg (14,875 lb)
- Max takeoff weight: 6,876 kg (15,159 lb)
- Powerplant: 2 × PZL Pegasus VIII nine-cylinder air-cooled radial piston engines, 490–510 kW (660–680 hp) each
- Propellers: 3-bladed Hamilton/PZL variable-pitch propellers

Performance

- Maximum speed: 380 km/h (240 mph, 210 kn) at 4,500 m (14,800 ft)
- Cruise speed: 300 km/h (190 mph, 160 kn) at 4,500 m (14,800 ft)
- Range: 1,250 km (780 mi, 670 nmi)
- Service ceiling: 8,000 m (26,000 ft)
- Rate of climb: 6.8 m/s (1,340 ft/min)
- Wing loading: 138.9 kg/m^{2} (28.4 lb/sq ft)
- Power/mass: 0.15 kW/kg (0.09 hp/lb)

Armament

- 2 × 7.7 mm Vickers F machine guns in nose turret
- 2 × 7.7 mm Vickers F machine guns in upper dorsal rear turret
- 1 × 7.7 mm Vickers F machine gun in ventral underbelly position
- 660 kg (1,450 lb) of bombs

== See also ==
Aircraft of comparable role, configuration, and era

- Amiot 143
- Bloch MB.131
- Bristol Blenheim
- Dornier Do 17
- Fokker T.V
- Junkers Ju 86
- Lockheed Hudson
- Martin B-10
- Potez 540
- PZL.37 Łoś
- Tupolev SB

Related lists

- List of aircraft of World War II
