= Jerzy Rudlicki =

Polish aerospace engineer

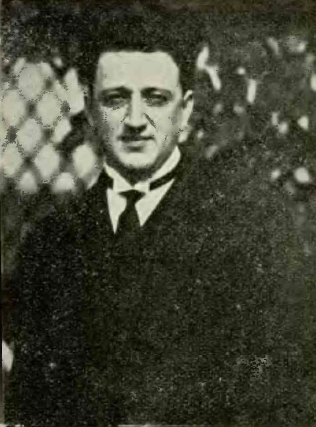
- Rudlicki in 1930.
- Born: Jerzy Stanisław Rudlicki; March 14, 1893; Odessa, Russian Empire
- Died: August 18, 1977 (aged 84); Fort Lauderdale, United States
- Education: Institut supérieur de l'aéronautique et de l'espace
- Occupations: Engineer, inventor, pilot
- Known for: V-tail
- Awards: Gold Cross of Merit; Legion of Honour; Order of Saint Vladimir

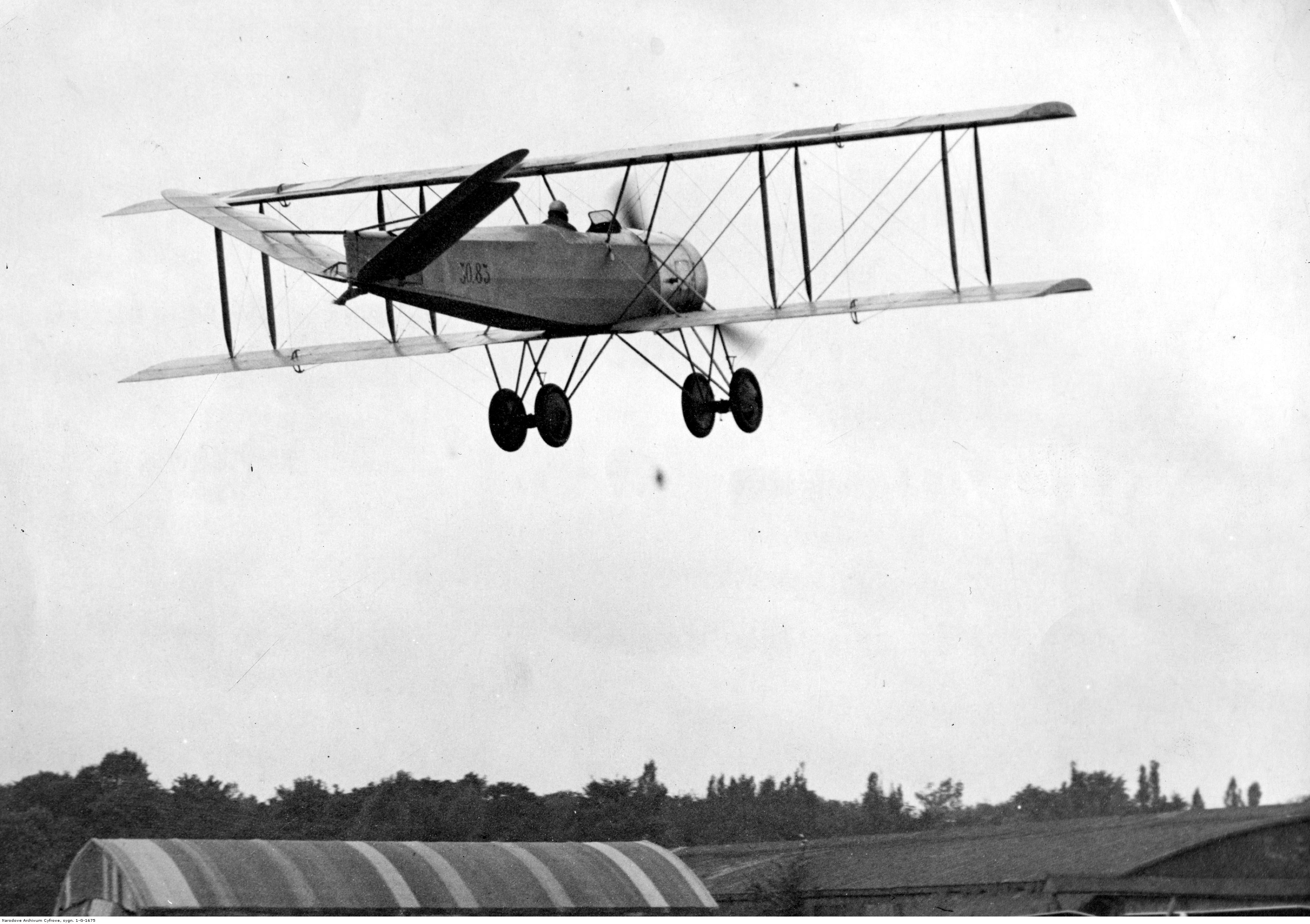
Hanriot H.28

Jerzy Rudlicki (Polish pronunciation: [ˈjɛʐɨ rudˈlit͡skʲi]; 14 March 1893 – 18 August 1977) was a Polish pilot and aerospace engineer. Best known for his inventing and patenting of the V-tail, which is an aircraft tail configuration that combines the rudder and elevators into one system.

Rudlicki was also the Chief Engineer of the Polish Plage i Laśkiewicz works, later known as LWS in Interwar Poland.

== Early life and military career ==
Rudlicki was born on 14 March 1893 in Odessa. In the years (1909-1911) he constructed seven gliders which resulted in Rudlicki receiving a diploma with honors from the Odessa National Polytechnic University. In 1914, Rudlicki competed officer school and pilot school in Simferopol. Rudlicki served as pilot in the Russian Air Force and in 1917 fought for the Blue Army (Poland) in France under General Józef Haller. Rudlicki also fought in the Polish–Soviet War in 1920 which resulted in Rudlicki being awarded the Cross of Valor in 1921 for his heroics as a pilot during World War I.

== Interwar Period in Poland ==
In the years (1921-1922), Rudlicki studied at the École nationale supérieure de l'aéronautique et de l'espace, from which Rudlicki received his Engineering degree. From (1922-1925), Rudlicki worked at the Institute of Aviation, Warsaw as head of the experimental laboratory. In 1926, Rudlicki became the Chief Engineer for Polish Aerospace Manufacturer Plage i Laśkiewicz located in Lublin, Poland. Throughout his career as Chief Engineer of Plage i Laśkiewicz, he supervised the construction of both civilian and military aircraft most notably the: Lublin R-VIII, and R IX Torpedo Bomber.

During the Interwar Period, Rudlicki was also credited for creating the first retractable landing gear in Poland. In the years (1928-1931) he worked on perfecting the V-tail design which was patented in 1930 as (Polish Patent #15938) and tested on a modified Hanriot HD.28 in 1931. One of the most notable examples of the V-tail design can be seen on the F-117 Nighthawk.

== WWII Period and Post WWII Period ==
After the outbreak of World War II, Rudlicki relocated to the France and began work at SNCASO. While working at SNCASO Rudlicki and 74 of his former workers fixed and upgraded 200 Curtiss Hawk and Martin Maryland but after the Battle of France Rudlicki and his workers escaped to Great Britain.

In 1943, Rudlicki started work at a Lockheed modification center near Belfast, Northern Ireland. While working at Lockheed, Rudlicki created an updated version of the Swiatecki bomb slip, which was originally constructed by fellow Polish aerospace engineer Władysław Świątecki. The updated bomb slip was created for the American Boeing B-17 Flying Fortress.

After the end of World War II, Rudlicki immigrated to the United States where he began work with Republic Aviation. While at Republic Aviation, Rudlicki constructed a controlled discharge nozzles for jet engine General Electric J85, allowing the engine thrust vector deflection for vertical take-off jet aircraft. After 16 years with Republic Aviation, Rudlicki retired and at the time of his death was awarded with the Gold Cross of Merit, Cross of Valor and, the French Legion of Honor.

== See also ==
- Timeline of Polish science and technology
- List of Polish inventors and discoverers
