= PZL.16 =

Polish passenger aircraft

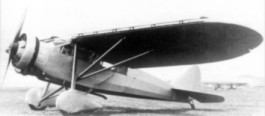

General information
- Type: Passenger plane
- Manufacturer: Państwowe Zakłady Lotnicze
- Status: Prototype
- Primary user: Poland
- Number built: 1 (prototype)

History
- First flight: 1932

The PZL.16 was a Polish passenger aircraft, designed in the early 1930s in the PZL in Warsaw. It remained a prototype.

== Development ==
The plane was designed in 1931 as a small passenger plane for 4 passengers, ordered by the Polish Ministry of Communications. The main designer was Stanisław Prauss of the PZL works. The new plane utilized parts of PZL Ł.2 liaison plane, including the wing, tail, landing gear and engine (the factory manufactured more PZL Ł.2 parts, than aircraft ordered). The only prototype was flown in the beginning of 1932.

== Design ==
PZL.16 was a high-wing braced monoplane, conventional in layout, of all-metal construction. It had a steel framed, canvas covered fuselage (engine part covered with duralumin). The elliptical wing was two-spar, of duralumin construction, canvas-covered, fitted with slats and flaps. The tail was made of duralumin. It had a conventional fixed landing gear with a rear wheel, main gear had teardrop covers. The closed cabin had a capacity of five: a pilot in front and 4 passengers in two rows, with doors on the left.

It had a 9-cylinder air-cooled Polish Skoda Works Wright Whirlwind J-5A radial engine delivering 240 hp (179 kW) take-off power and 220 hp (164 kW) nominal power, in a Townend ring, driving a two-blade metal propeller. 280-litre fuel tanks were in wings. The cruise fuel consumption was 50-60 L/h.

== Operational history ==
The plane was to take part in a contest for a successor of Junkers F.13 planes in LOT Polish Airlines, along with PWS-24 and Lublin R-XVI, but it crashed in April 1932 during tests. The reason was error in assembly of ailerons. After crash, further works upon PZL.16 ceased; available publications do not mention reasons. It was lighter, faster and of more modern construction, than counterparts, with a similar payload, but the crew was 1 instead of 2.

Stanisław Prauss next designed a preliminary design of a fast mail plane PZL.17, a counterpart of PWS-54. It was based on the PZL.16, differing in aerodynamically refined fuselage and cantilever wing, but it remained in sketches.

== Specifications (PZL 16 estimated) ==
Data from Polish Aircraft 1893–1939

General characteristics

- Crew: 1
- Capacity: 4
- Length: 7.95 m (26 ft 1 in)
- Wingspan: 14.1 m (46 ft 3 in)
- Height: 2.59 m (8 ft 6 in)
- Empty weight: 780 kg (1,720 lb)
- Gross weight: 1,450 kg (3,197 lb)
- Powerplant: 1 × Polish-Skoda J-5 Whirlwind 9-cylinder air-cooled radial piston engine, 160 kW (220 hp)
- Propellers: 2-bladed fixed-pitch propeller

Performance

- Maximum speed: 200 km/h (120 mph, 110 kn)
- Range: 800 km (500 mi, 430 nmi)
- g limits: +7 ultimate
- Wing loading: 56 kg/m^{2} (11 lb/sq ft)
- Power/mass: 0.069 hp/lb (0.113 kW/kg)

== See also ==
Related development

- PZL Ł.2

Aircraft of comparable role, configuration, and era

- PWS-24
- Lublin R-XVI
