= RX2 =

RX2 or variants may refer to:

- Mazda RX-2 midsized car
- .rx2 file format
- RX II sailing yacht
- Lublin R-XII airplane
- RX2 minor planet notation
  - 1983 RX2, see 4199 Andreev
  - 1985 RX2, see (20993) 1985 RX2
  - 1986 RX2, see 7925 Shelus
  - 1991 RX2, see 6157 Prey
- RX-2, a character from Garfield
- RX2, a product from iZotope
- RX-2, a grand piano from Kawai Musical Instruments
- RX2, the differential from the Renault Captur
- RX02, a pharmaceutical from Rib-X Pharmaceuticals
- DEC RX02, 8"-floppy system, see List of floppy disk formats
- RX2, FIA rallycross racing category
