= PWS-21 =

Polish passenger aircraft

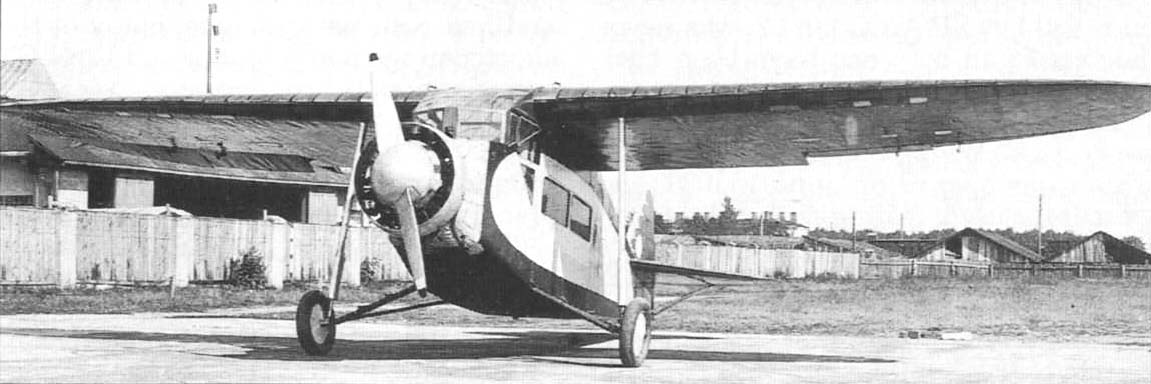

General information
- Type: Passenger aircraft
- Manufacturer: PWS
- Status: prototype
- Primary user: Polish civilian aviation (LOT Polish Airlines)
- Number built: 1

History
- First flight: April 1930

The PWS-21 was a Polish passenger aircraft for 4 passengers, built in PWS factory in 1930, that remained a prototype.

== Development ==
The aircraft was developed for a contest for a successor of Junkers F-13 in LOT Polish Airlines. The first design of 1929, named PWS-21, developed by Stanisław Cywiński and Jarosław Naleszkiewicz, was a braced high-wing plane, but it was not realized because LOT demanded bigger passenger cab.

The next design, named PWS-21bis, was a cantilever high-wing plane, similar to Fokker F.VIIa/1m design. The only prototype (markings SP-AEC) first flew in the spring, probably April 1930 in Biała Podlaska. Its counterpart was Lublin R-XI.

The plane appeared not successful. It was too heavy, what resulted in poor speed, ceiling and range, and long take off. In 1931 it was evaluated in LOT airlines, but after a test flight it was returned to the factory. However, at that time there was its development, PWS-24 built, sharing the same lightweight wing, which was ordered by LOT.

== Description (PWS-21bis) ==
High-wing cantilever monoplane of mixed construction, with closed cab and single engine. A fuselage made of a steel frame, covered with canvas. Straight one-piece wooden wing, with elliptical endings, plywood covered, two-spar. Crew of two (pilot and mechanic), in a cabin before the wing, with twin controls. The cabin had a vertical front windshield and doors on both sides. Next and slightly below in a fuselage, under the wing, there was a cabin for 4 passengers, with a door on the left. The cabin had a toilet. The fifth passenger could be taken instead of the mechanic. 9 cylinder radial engine Skoda Wright Whirlwind J-5 (240 hp take-off power, 220 hp nominal power) in the fuselage front, fitted with a Townend ring. Two-blade metal propeller of a fixed pitch. Conventional landing gear, with a rear skid; struts with shock absorbers joined the main gear with wings. Fuel tanks 250 L in central wing section.

== Specifications (PWS-21bis) ==
Data from Polish aircraft 1893-1939

General characteristics

- Crew: 1 (optionally 2)
- Capacity: 4 pax / 683 kg (1,505.8 lb)
- Length: 9.65 m (31 ft 8 in)
- Wingspan: 15 m (49 ft 3 in)
- Height: 3.2 m (10 ft 6 in)
- Wing area: 31.75 m^{2} (341.8 sq ft)
- Empty weight: 1,300 kg (2,866 lb)
- Gross weight: 2,000 kg (4,409 lb)
- Powerplant: 1 × Skoda-Wright Whirlwind J-5 9-cylinder air-cooled radial piston engine, 160 kW (220 hp)
- Propellers: 2-bladed AWK Type C fixed-pitch metal propeller

Performance

- Maximum speed: 167 km/h (104 mph, 90 kn) at sea level

136 km/h (85 mph; 73 kn) at 1,000 m (3,300 ft)

- Stall speed: 93 km/h (58 mph, 50 kn)
- Service ceiling: 1,300 m (4,300 ft)
- Rate of climb: 1.3 m/s (260 ft/min)
- Wing loading: 63.2 kg/m^{2} (12.9 lb/sq ft)
- Power/mass: 0.82 kW/kg (0.5 hp/lb)

== See also ==
Related development

- PWS-24

Aircraft of comparable role, configuration, and era

- Fokker F.VIIa/1m
- Lublin R-XI
