= Jerry Cartwright =

Jerry Cartwright may refer to:

- Jerry Cartwright, designer of RX II
- Jerry Cartwright, character in 31 North 62 East
