= Lublin R-XI =

Polish passenger plane for 4 passengers

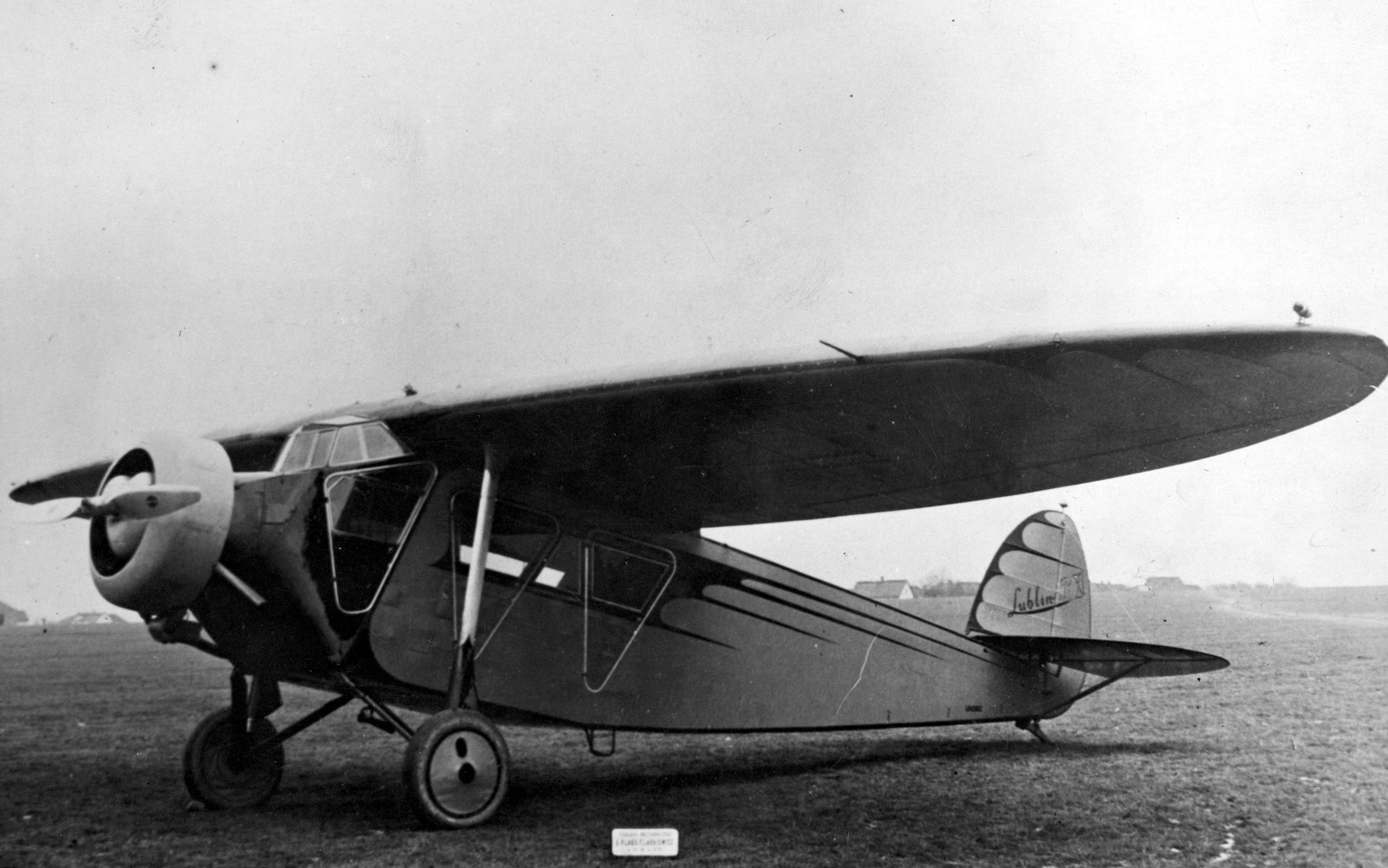

General information
- Type: Passenger plane
- National origin: Poland
- Manufacturer: Plage i Laśkiewicz
- Status: prototype
- Number built: 1

History
- First flight: 8 February 1930

The Lublin R-XI was the Polish passenger plane for 4 passengers, designed in 1930 in the Plage i Laśkiewicz factory in Lublin, that remained a prototype.

== Development ==
The aircraft was developed for a contest for a successor of Junkers F-13 as a light passenger and mail plane in LOT Polish Airlines, announced by the Ministry of Communication. The design was partly modeled on a construction of Fokker F.VII, produced under license by Plage i Laśkiewicz, especially in a wing design. The main designer was Jerzy Rudlicki. The prototype was first flown on 8 February 1930 in Lublin (registration: SP-ACC). From June 1930 it was evaluated by the LOT Airlines. The prototype was damaged during take-off in July 1931, and was not repaired.

The aircraft was not successful, because its weight appeared 250 kg more, than designed, it also had worse speed, range and ceiling, than expected (its competitor, the PWS-21, was not successful either). Its improved development became Lublin R-XVI, built in a small series, although not as a passenger plane.

== Description ==
The R-XI was a mixed construction cantilever high-wing monoplane, single-engine, conventional in layout. It had a steel-framed, canvas-covered fuselage (engine part covered with duralumin) and a single-piece, plywood-covered, three-spar elliptical wing of wooden construction. The empennage was of steel construction, canvas covered. It had a conventional fixed landing gear, with a rear skid, base 2.7 m. The main gear was joined with a wing by struts. The closed cabin had a capacity of six: a pilot, a mechanic and 4 passengers. Two crewmen had twin controls and individual doors on either side, the fifth passenger could be carried instead of the mechanic. The passenger cabin had height 1.5 m and width 1.3 m and two triangular doors on the left side. Behind it there was a place for a baggage.

Single engine in front: 9-cylinder air-cooled Polish Skoda Works Wright Whirlwind J-5 radial engine delivering 240 hp (179 kW) take-off power and 220 hp (164 kW) nominal power, with a NACA cowling, driving a two-blade metal propeller of a fixed pitch. A 300-litre fuel tank was fitted in wing and 150-litre under the cab (normal capacity was 200 L). The cruise fuel consumption was 40–50 L/h.

== Specifications ==
Data from Jane's all the World's Aircraft 1931, Polish Aircraft 1893–1939, Polskie konstrukcje lotnicze 1893-1939

General characteristics

- Crew: 1-2
- Capacity: 4-5 pax / 733 kg (1,616 lb) payload
- Length: 9.8 m (32 ft 2 in)
- Wingspan: 15 m (49 ft 3 in)
- Height: 2.4 m (7 ft 10 in)
- Wing area: 30 m^{2} (320 sq ft)
- Aspect ratio: 7
- Empty weight: 1,033 kg (2,277 lb)
- Gross weight: 1,943 kg (4,284 lb)
- Powerplant: 1 × Polish-Skoda J-5 Whirlwind 9-cylinder air-cooled radial piston engine, 170 kW (230 hp)
- Propellers: 2-bladed Standard Steel fixed-pitch metal propeller

Performance

- Maximum speed: 210 km/h (130 mph, 110 kn) at sea level
- Cruise speed: 168 km/h (104 mph, 91 kn)
- Landing speed: 85–90 km/h (53–56 mph; 46–49 kn)
- Stall speed: 90 km/h (56 mph, 49 kn)
- Range: 730 km (450 mi, 390 nmi)
- Ferry range: 900 km (560 mi, 490 nmi)
- Endurance: 6 hours with wing tanks; 3 hours 30 minutes with jettisonable fuselage tank only
- Service ceiling: 6,000 m (20,000 ft)
- Rate of climb: 1.8 m/s (350 ft/min)
- Time to altitude: 4,000 m (13,000 ft) in 22 minutes
- Wing loading: 65 kg/m^{2} (13 lb/sq ft)
- Power/mass: 0.05155 hp/lb (0.08475 kW/kg)

== See also ==
Related development

- Lublin R-XII
- Lublin R-XVI

Aircraft of comparable role, configuration, and era

- PWS-21
- Fokker F.VIIa/1m
