= PWS-24 =

1930s Polish passenger aircraft

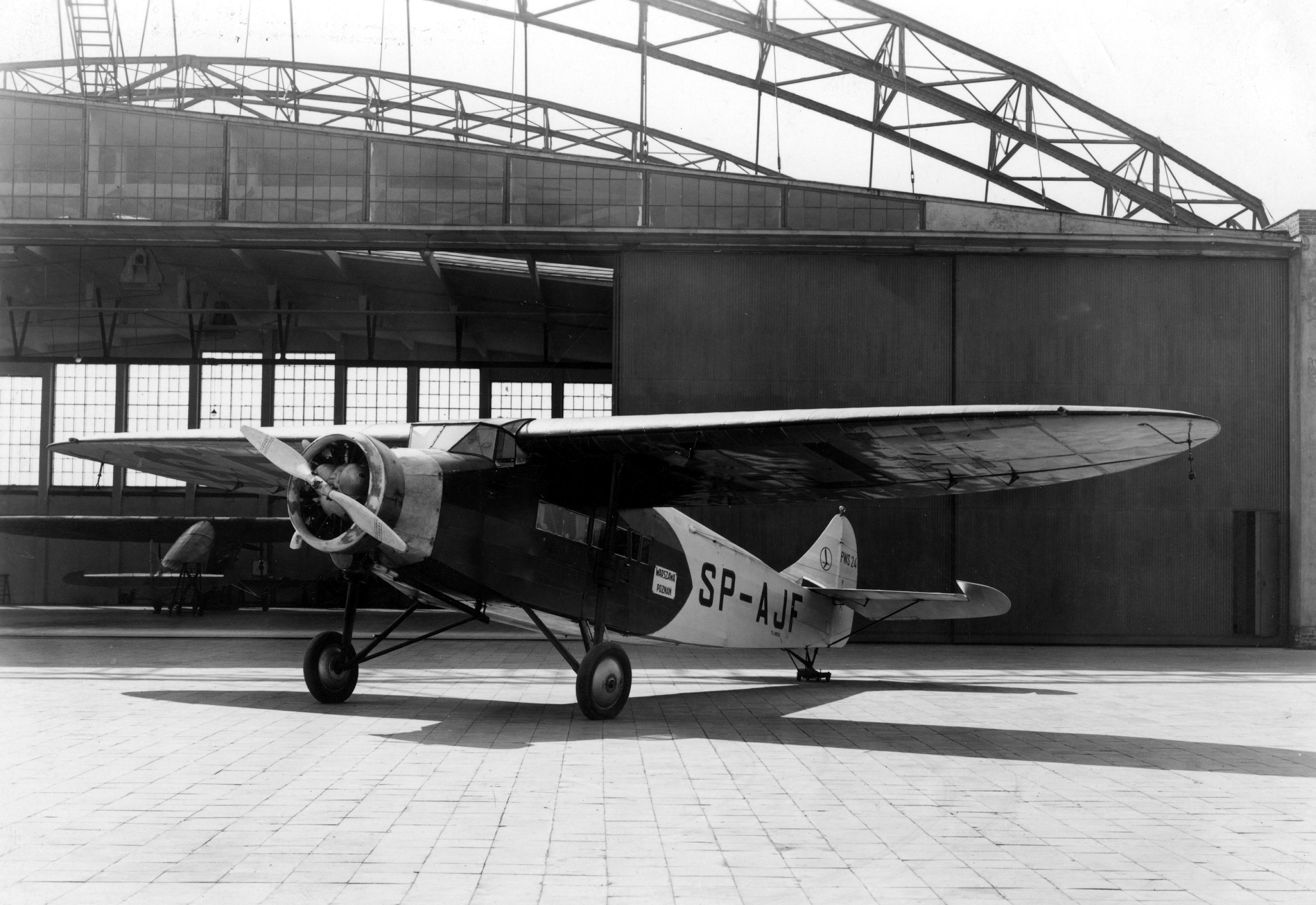

General information
- Type: Passenger aircraft
- Manufacturer: PWS
- Primary user: Polish civilian aviation (LOT Polish Airlines)
- Number built: 11

History
- Manufactured: 1933-1935
- Introduction date: 1933
- First flight: August 1931

The PWS-24 was a Polish single-engine passenger aircraft for 4 passengers, built in PWS factory, used from 1933 to 1936 by LOT Polish Airlines. In spite of its limited capacity, it was the only series-built airliner of domestic design ever used by the LOT.

== Development ==
The aircraft was a development of an unsuccessful PWS-21, utilizing its lightweight construction wing (weight 300 kg). A fuselage and stabilizers were new. The main designer was Stanisław Cywiński. The prototype (markings SP-AGR) first flew in August 1931 in Biała Podlaska. After trials and some modifications, it won a Ministry of Communication's contest for a successor of Junkers F-13 in LOT airlines, against Lublin R-XVI. In June 1932 it took the first place in a passenger aircraft race at the international air meeting in Warsaw.

Polish Ministry of Communication ordered a series of 5 aircraft for LOT airlines, built in 1933 (markings: SP-AJF, -AJG, -AJH, -AJJ, -AJK). In 1932, the prototype SP-AGR was fitted with a more powerful engine, the 300 hp Lorraine Algol, instead of the 240 hp Wright Whirlwind J-5. It was later tested with a 400 hp Pratt & Whitney Wasp Junior engine. Maximum speed improved from 185 to 225 km/h, comparing with the basic variant.

In 1934 a production of further 5 aircraft started, with Wasp Junior engines, designated PWS-24bis (markings: SP-AMN, -AMO, -AMP, -AMR, -AMS). Also one PWS-24 was converted to PWS-24bis (SP-ASY, ex. SP-AJH).

== Usage ==
PWS-24 were put into use in LOT Polish Airlines from May 1, 1933 on domestic lines. Their flight characteristics and durability proved however worse, than of single-engined Fokker F.VIIa/1m, used by LOT, so their service was not long. In 1935 three PWS-24 (SP-AGR, -AJF, -AJJ) were converted to aerial photography variant, but in 1936 four PWS-24s were broken up. The last, SP-AJJ, was broken up in 1938.

PWS-24bis entered service in LOT in 1935. They were used there however only until 1936. PWS-24bis SP-AMR was sold in April 1935 to the Polish Air Force and used as a staff machine. It had a slight accident and compulsory landing on 27 April 1935, its further fate is not known. SP-ASY and -AMN were broken up in 1936-1937. SP-AMO was sold in 1936 to Maritime and Colonial League paramilitary organization and soon crashed in July 1936 during testing of a new variable-pitch propeller.

The remaining two PWS-24bis (SP-AMP and-AMS) were converted to aerial photography in 1936 and used until the outbreak of World War II in September 1939. After the German invasion, SP-AMP was damaged during bombing, while SP-AMS was evacuated to Romania, where it was seized by Romanian government in February 1940 and later used by the LARES line to aerial photography. It was broken up after an accident 8 September 1940.

== Operators ==
Poland

- LOT Polish Airlines
- Polish Air Force
- Maritime and Colonial League

Romania

- LARES

== Description ==
High-wing cantilever monoplane of mixed construction, with closed cab and single engine. A fuselage of a steel frame, covered with canvas on a wooden frame. Straight one-piece wooden wing, with elliptical endings, two-spar, plywood covered. Tailfins of steel frame, canvas covered. Crew of two (pilot and mechanic), in a cab before the wing, with twin controls. Next and below in a fuselage, under the wing, there was a cabin for 4 passengers, with wide rectangular windows and a door on the left side. Radial engine in fuselage front, fitted with a Townend ring. Two-blade metal propeller of variable pitch. Conventional fixed landing gear, with a rear skid; struts with shock absorbers joined the main gear with wings. Fuel tanks 260 L in central wing section (cruise consumption 50-58 L/h in PWS-24, 95 L/h in PWS-24bis).

Engine:

- PWS-24 - 9-cylinder air-cooled radial engine Wright Whirlwind J-5 (240 hp take-off power, 220 hp nominal power)
- PWS-24bis - 9-cylinder air-cooled radial engine Pratt and Whitney Wasp Junior TB (420 hp take-off power, 400 hp nominal power)

== Specifications (PWS-24bis) ==

Data from

General characteristics

- Crew: 2
- Capacity: 4
- Length: 9.65 m (31 ft 8 in)
- Wingspan: 15 m (49 ft 3 in)
- Height: 2.95 m (9 ft 8 in)
- Wing area: 31.75 m^{2} (341.8 sq ft)
- Empty weight: 1,220 kg (2,690 lb)
- Gross weight: 2,000 kg (4,409 lb)
- Powerplant: 1 × Pratt and Whitney Wasp Junior TB 9-cylinder air-cooled radial piston engine, 310 kW (420 hp)
- Propellers: 2-bladed variable-pitch propeller

Performance

- Maximum speed: 225 km/h (140 mph, 121 kn)
- Cruise speed: 180 km/h (110 mph, 97 kn)
- Stall speed: 90 km/h (56 mph, 49 kn) ~
- Range: 700 km (430 mi, 380 nmi)
- Service ceiling: 5,000 m (16,000 ft)
- Rate of climb: 4.2 m/s (830 ft/min)
- Wing loading: 63 kg/m^{2} (13 lb/sq ft)

== See also ==
Related development

- PWS-21

Aircraft of comparable role, configuration, and era

- Fokker F.VIIa/1m
- ICAR Comercial
- Lockheed Vega
- Lublin R-XVI
- PWS-54
