= PWS-54 =

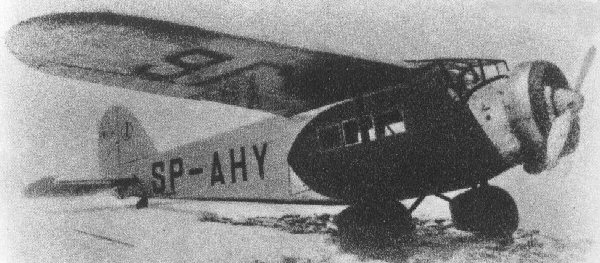

General information
- Type: Passenger and mail plane
- Manufacturer: PWS
- Designer: Zbysław Ciołkosz
- Status: prototype
- Primary user: LOT Polish Airlines
- Number built: 1

History
- Introduction date: 1933
- First flight: 1933

The PWS-54 was a Polish single-engine passenger and mail plane for three passengers; one alone was built in 1932 in the PWS factory.

== Development ==
The aircraft was designed by Zbysław Ciołkosz for an order of the Ministry of Communication for a fast plane with higher performance than the PWS-24 airliner, for carrying mail or four passengers. Much attention was given to aerodynamics and the PWS-54 was 40 km/h (25 mph) faster than PWS-24, which used the same engine. A prototype, built in 1932, was first flown in early 1933 at Biała Podlaska.

The PWS-54 was evaluated by LOT Polish Airlines from 1933 but after few years it was withdrawn from use and returned to the factory. The design was not quite successful; the main fault was too small a payload, which limited either its capacity or range. It was intended to carry four passengers but at this weight the range was too small (311 mi; 270 nmi (500 km)) to be useful, so it was completed with only three passenger seats. However, because of not too good handling it was not used to carry passengers at all but only for cargo and mail transport. It also had quite long landing run despite air brakes in landing gear covers. A modernized PWS-24bis with a more powerful engine offered the same performance.

== Description ==
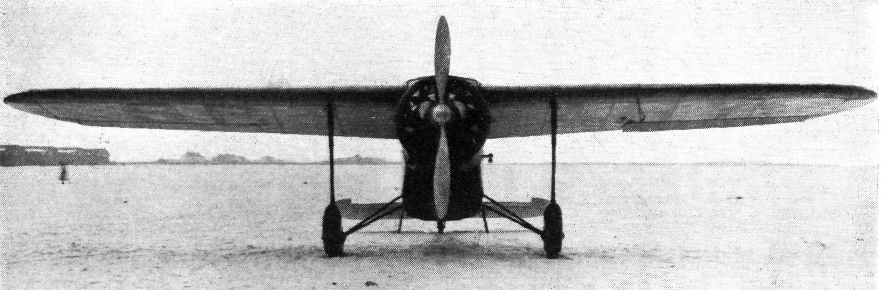
Front view

The PWS-57 was a high wing cantilever monoplane of mixed construction with an enclosed cockpit and single engine. Its fuselage was steel framed and fabric covered. Its one-piece wing, tapered with elliptical tips in plan, was built around two wooden box spars and covered with stressed plywood. The tail unit, like the fuselage, was steel framed and ply covered, with split, balanced elevators. Fin and tailplane were externally braced together.

The single pilot was housed in a cockpit ahead of the wing, well glazed and with a pointed front windshield. Behind and slightly below the cockpit the passengers' cabin was accessed by a door on either side of the fuselage under the wing. Cockpit and cabin were separated but there was a sliding door, accessed by moving one of the forward passenger seats, to allow the pilot to get to the cockpit. The original plan was for two rearward- and two forward-facing passenger seats in the 1,041 mm (41 in) × 1,803 mm (71 in) × 1,245 mm (49 in) high cabin. Between the doors the underside of the wing was cut away, increasing the headroom locally by 152 mm (6 in) for ease of access.

It was powered by a Wright Whirlwind J-5 of 240 hp (179 kW) take-off power and 220 hp (164 kW) nominal power, produced in the Polish Skoda Works as the Skoda-Wright J-5. This drove a two-blade metal propeller and was fitted with a Townend ring cowling. The PWS-54 had a conventional fixed undercarriage with a rear wheel. Each mainwheel was mounted on a V-form, steel tube strut hinged to the lower fuselage, with long, vertical shock absorber legs to the wings. The wheels were enclosed with spats that split into fore and aft sections for servicing.

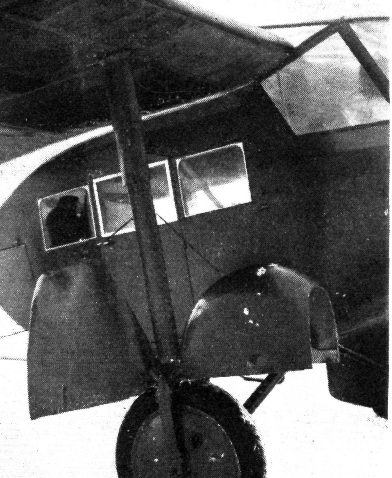
Wheel fairing open, passenger door detail

== Specifications ==
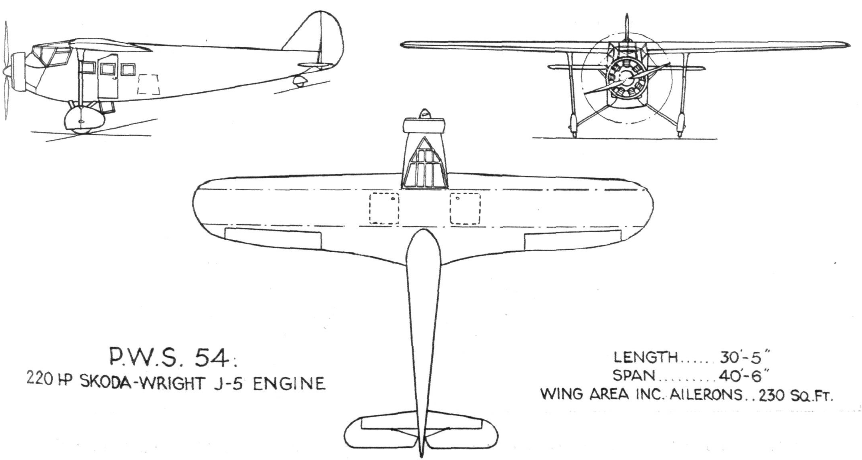

Data from Flight 31 August 1933, p. 886

General characteristics

- Crew: One
- Capacity: Three
- Length: 30 ft 5 in (9.27 m)
- Wingspan: 40 ft 6 in (12.34 m)
- Height: 8 ft 4 in (2.54 m)
- Wing area: 230 sq ft (21 m^{2}) including ailerons
- Empty weight: 2,070 lb (939 kg) fully equipped
- Gross weight: 3,370 lb (1,529 kg) maximum
- Fuel capacity: 85 imp gal (386 L; 102 US gal)
- Powerplant: 1 × Skoda-Wright J-5 9 cylinder air cooled radial, 220 hp (160 kW)

Performance

- Maximum speed: 145 mph (233 km/h, 126 kn)
- Cruise speed: 124 mph (200 km/h, 108 kn)
- Minimum control speed: 63 mph (101 km/h, 55 kn)
- Range: 500 mi (800 km, 430 nmi) ± 50 mi (80 km; 43 nmi) depending on load, with 440 lb (200 kg)
- Service ceiling: 14,800 ft (4,500 m) absolute
- Time to altitude: 4 minutes to 1,000 m
- Wing loading: 14.65 lb/sq ft (71.5 kg/m^{2})
- Take off distance:460 ft (140 m)
- Landing distance, no brakes: 790 ft (241 m)

== See also ==
Aircraft of comparable role, configuration, and era

- PWS-24
