= Nieuport-Delage NiD 640 =

NiD 640
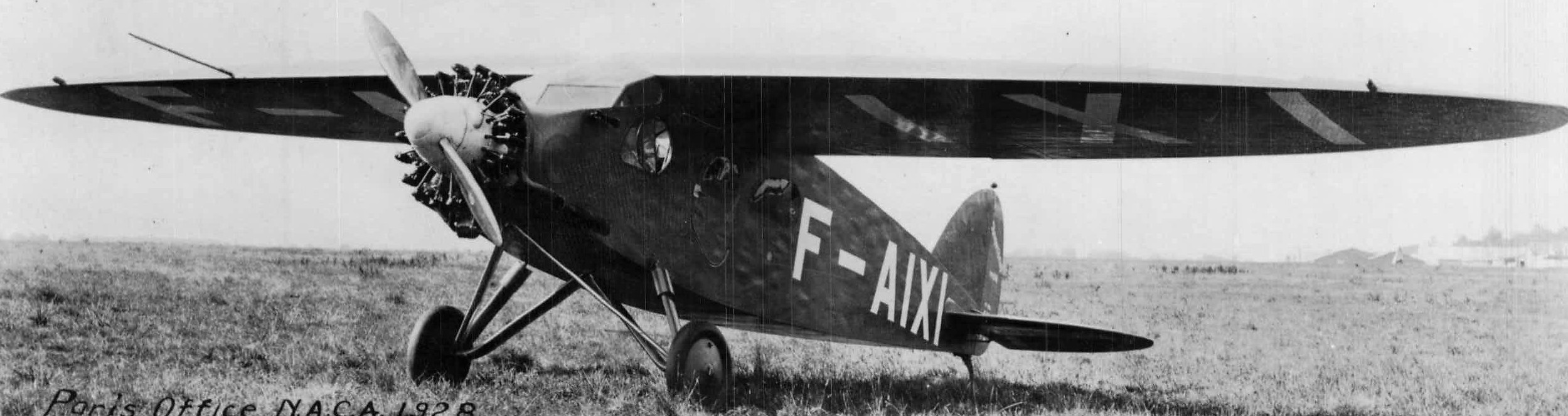

General information
- Type: four-seat cabin monoplane
- National origin: France
- Manufacturer: Nieuport-Delage
- Primary user: Société des Transports Aériens Rapides
- Number built: 14

History
- Introduction date: 1930
- First flight: 1927

The Nieuport-Delage NiD 640 was a four-passenger transport monoplane designed and produced by the French aircraft manufacturer Nieuport-Delage.

It was developed during the late 1920s primarily for use a civil aircraft, although some provisions were made towards its use in a military capacity as well. The NiD 640 was designed with a highly-efficient elliptical wing, a readily swappable engine arrangement, and made copious use of metal throughout its construction. It was outfitted with dual flying controls and other provisions that enabled the effective tuition of up to four trainees during a single flight. The baggage hold could also be adapted to accommodate wounded personnel when used in the air ambulance role.

First flown in 1927 and introduced during 1930, the sole NiD 640 was soon joined by a batch of twelve NiD 641 production standard aircraft, the majority of which were operated on the civil routes of Société des Transports Aériens Rapides. Further production batches did not occur, save for a single NiD 642 that went unsold and was ultimately scrapped.

== Development ==
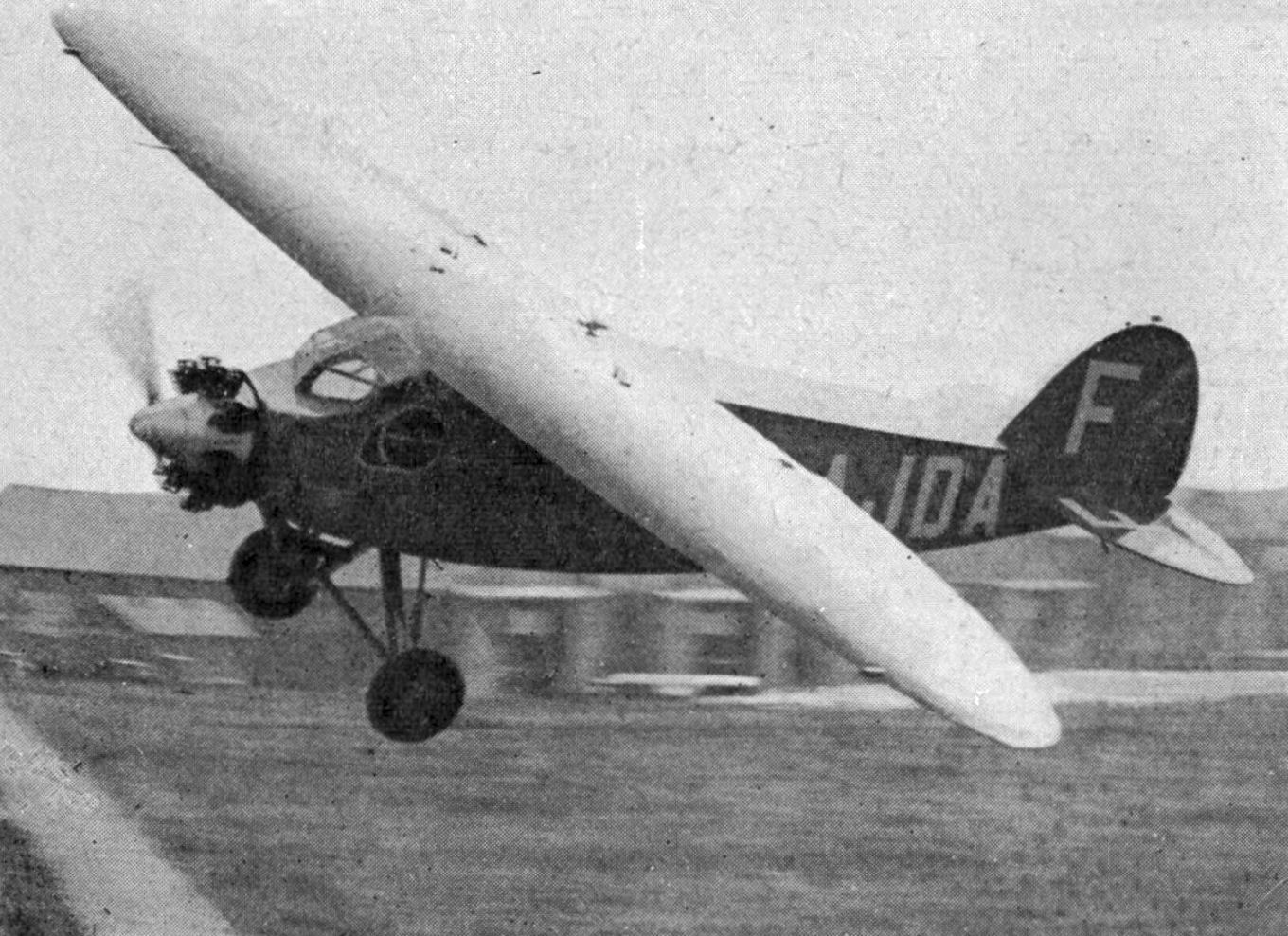
NiD 640 in flight, 1929

The NiD 640 was a commercial high-wing cantilever monoplane of mostly-metal construction. It was marketed towards a variety of roles in addition to its primary use as a passenger transport; it could be readily used as a trainer aircraft, carrying up to four trainees that could be rotated through the cockpit throughout a single flight. While mainly envisioned for civilian purposes, it was also promoted for use during times of war as an air ambulance, being able to carry up to two wounded personnel upon stretchers.

The nose of the NiD 640 accommodated a single radial engine. It was specifically designed to be facilitate accessibility, to the extent that the engine could be entirely removed with relatively high speed and ease, as well as to enable the installation of alternative engines simply by changing the engine support, which in turn was only attached at four points to the front end of the fuselage. The oil tank for the engine was located directly behind it. The engine bay was separated from the cockpit directly behind it via a firewall.

The center section of the fuselage accommodated an enclosed cockpit that was located forward of the wing. This cockpit accommodated a two-person crew and was furnished with dual flying controls, which could be switched on and off at the pilot's discretion; this function was desirable for the aircraft's potential use as a trainer. The ailerons were actuated via torsion cables while both the rudder and the elevator were controlled using a combination of cables and tubes. Directly behind the cockpit and underneath the wing was the passenger cabin, which could comfortably accommodate up to four travellers, one of the seats for which would typically removed during boarding to better facilitate entry and egress. The cabin was lit via multiple large windows and was relatively well ventilated. To the aft of the passenger cockpit was the baggage hold; in an air ambulance configuration, this space could accommodate a single patient on a stretcher.

The wing of the NiD 640 was elliptical and had a relatively large aspect ratio, which provided favourable aerodynamic efficiency. This wing was entirely made of wood, the variable width spars being composed of spruce; the four largest spars were used as attachment girders for other elements. Both the leading edge and trailing edge of the wing were also spruce, while the wing covering comprised varying thicknesses of birch and plywood. The wing also accommodated a pair of fuel tanks which, due to their positioning in relation to the aircraft's centre of gravity, made no impact upon the flying controls no matter who much or little fuel they contained. In an emergency situation, the pilot could rapidly release the majority of the fuel left in the tanks.

The empennage of the aircraft was integrated with the fuselage and the stabiliser was embedded into the planking. The horizontal surface was elliptical and could be adjusted on the ground; it shared a similar structure to that of the wing, comprising spruce, poplar, and plywood elements. The vertical surface consisted of a parabolic fin and a near-elliptical rudder. The landing gear consisted a pair of independent triangular structural members hinged to the fuselage. The forwards struts were made of streamlined duralumin tubing, while other elements were made of steel tubing. A pair of shock absorbers that used rubber washers under compression was set on either side of the fuselage.

== Operational history ==
A single NiD 640, powered by a 160 kW (220 hp) Wright J-5C radial engine, was produced during the late 1920s. It was promptly followed by 12 production aircraft, designated NiD 641, that were powered by a 180 kW (240 hp) Lorraine 7M Mizar radial engine instead. The sole 640 was converted to an ambulance aircraft and was later refitted with a Mizar engine to bring it up to 641 standard. One aircraft was powered by a 175 kW (235 hp) Armstrong Siddeley Lynx Major engine and designated the NiD 642 but it did not find a buyer and was ultimately scrapped. Seven NiD 641s were flown by Société des Transports Aériens Rapides (STAR), a subsidiary of Nieport-Delage, on cargo and passenger services from Paris.

== Variants ==
NiD 640
Prototype with a 160 kW (220 hp) Wright J-5C radial engine, one built later converted to a 641.
NiD 641
Production aircraft with a 180 kW (240 hp) Lorraine 7M Mizar radial engine, 12 built.
NiD 642
Powered by a 175 kW (235 hp) Armstrong Siddeley Lynx Major engine, one built.

== Operators ==
Brazil

- Varig

France

- Société des Transports Aériens Rapides

== Specifications (NiD 641) ==
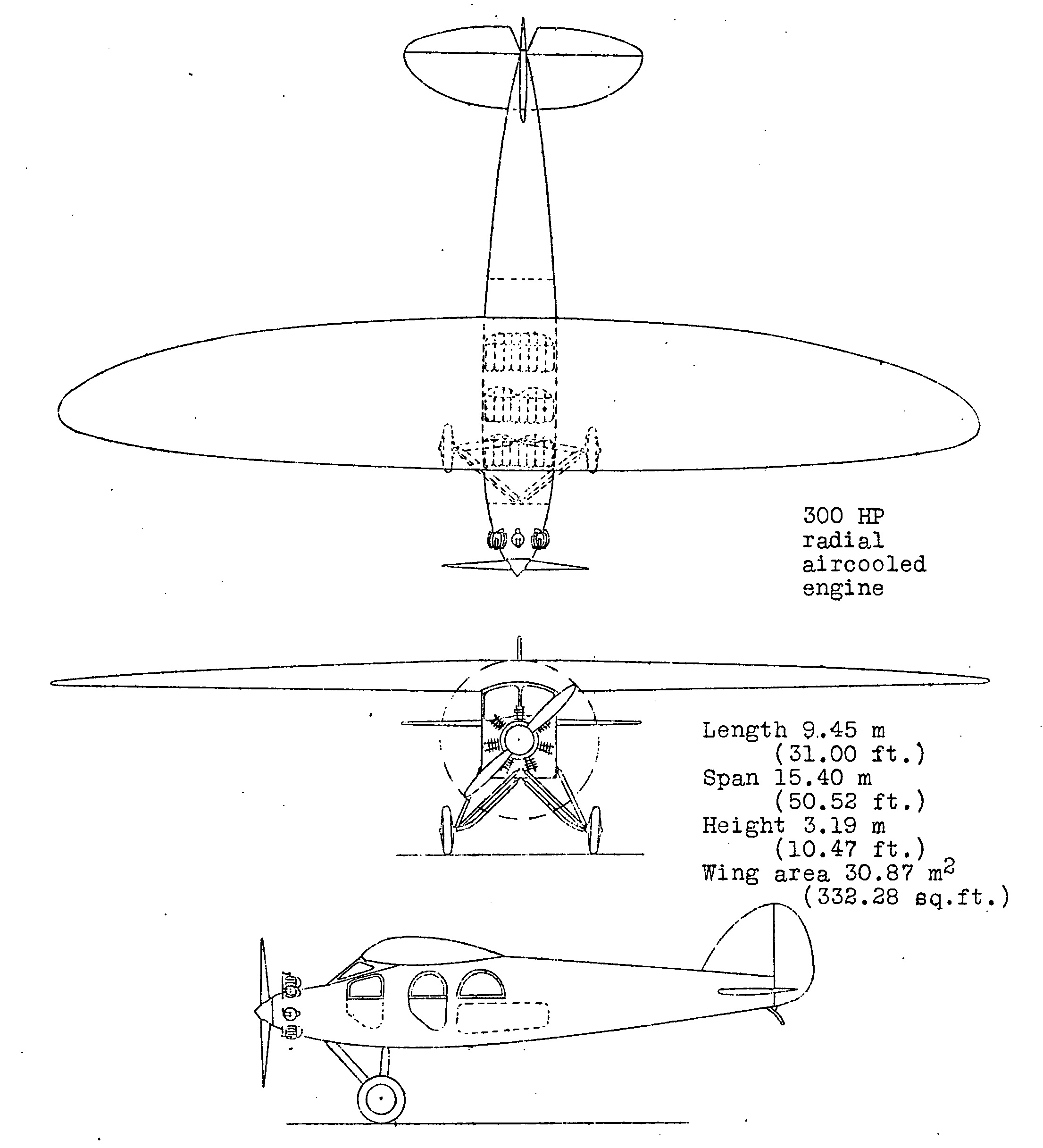
Nieuport-Delage NiD 640 3-view drawing from NACA Aircraft Circular No.92

Data from L'Aéronautique, Jane's all the World's Aircraft 1928

General characteristics

- Crew: Two
- Capacity: Four passengers or up to 700 kg (1,500 lb) of disposable loads, such as mail
- Length: 9.45 m (31 ft 0 in)
- Wingspan: 15.40 m (50 ft 6 in)
- Height: 3.19 m (10 ft 6 in)
- Wing area: 30.9 m^{2} (333 sq ft)
- Empty weight: 1,050 kg (2,315 lb)
- Gross weight: 1,750 kg (3,858 lb)
- Powerplant: 1 × Lorraine 7M Mizar 7-cylinder radial, 170 kW (230 hp)

Performance

- Maximum speed: 205 km/h (127 mph, 111 kn) at ground level
- Service ceiling: 5,500 m (18,000 ft) absolute
- Time to altitude: 1,000 m (3,300 ft) in five minutes and 30 seconds; 2,000 m (6,600 ft) in 12 minutes and 30 seconds
- Wing loading: 56.6 kg/m^{2} (11.6 lb/sq ft)
- Power/mass: 0.099 kW/kg (0.06 hp/lb)
- Landing speed: 88 km/h (55 mph)
