= Vought FU =

1920's US Navy biplane fighter aircraft

FU
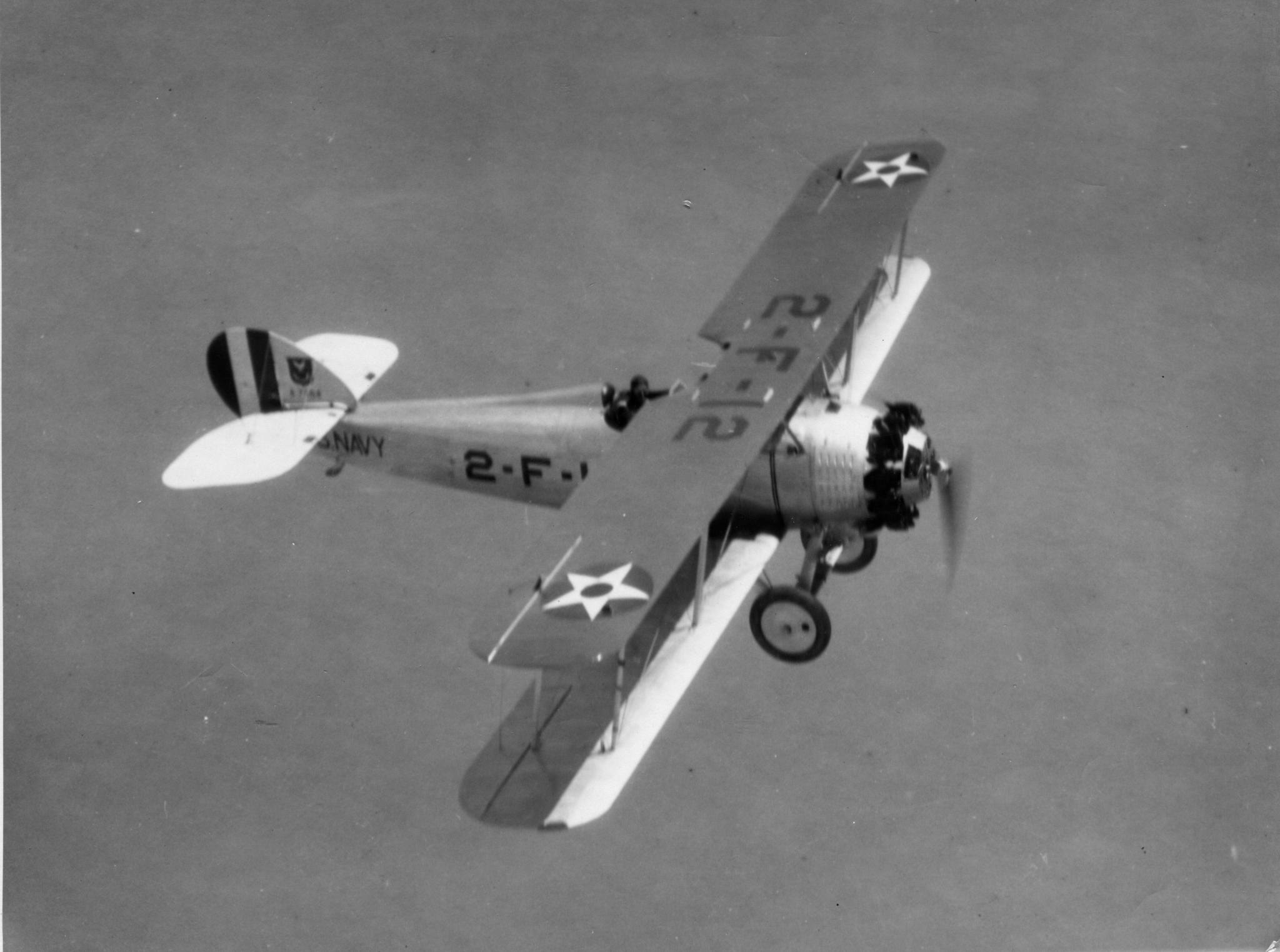
- FU-1 of VF-2 in 1928

General information
- Type: Fighter aircraft
- National origin: United States of America
- Manufacturer: Vought
- Status: Retired from Military service
- Primary user: United States Navy
- Number built: 20

History
- Introduction date: 1927
- Retired: 1929

The Vought FU was a biplane fighter aircraft of the United States Navy in service during the late 1920s.

== Design and development ==
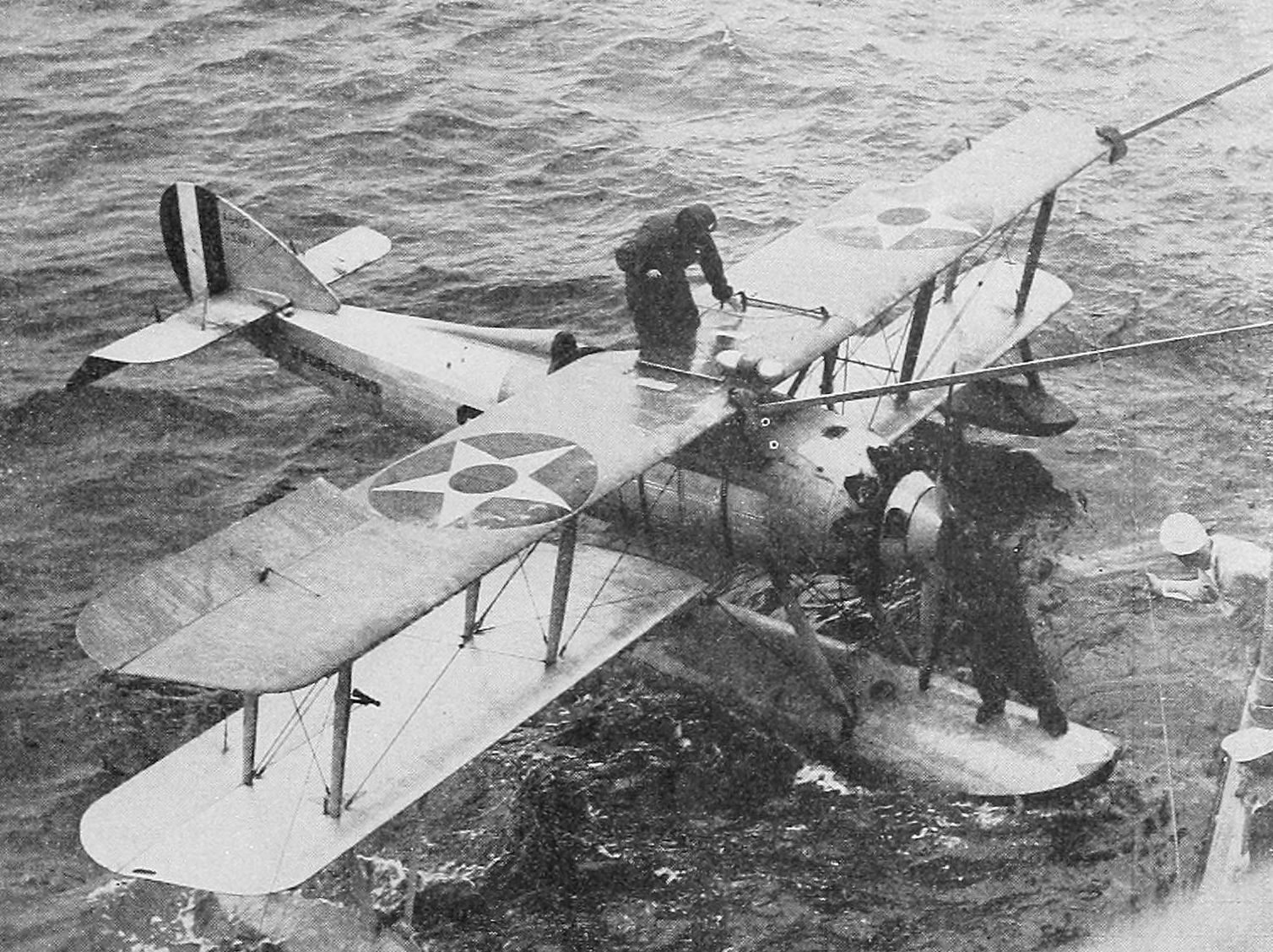
Vought UO-1 photo from Aero Digest June 1926

Pleased with the company's VE-7, in 1926 the Navy gave Vought a $459,709 contract for 20 convertible land/sea fighters. Vought already had a two-seat observation plane, the UO-1, basically a VE-7 with additional fuselage streamlining and a Wright J-3 radial engine. This was made into a fighter simply by covering over the front cockpit of the observation plane, mounting machine guns in that area, and upgrading to a 220 hp (160 kW) Wright R-790 Whirlwind with a supercharger. With the help of the supercharger, the newly designated FU-1 was able to reach a speed of 147 mph (237 km/h) at 13,000 ft (4,000 m).

The FU-1s were delivered to VF-2B based in San Diego, California. With their float gear mounted, one was assigned to each of the battleships of the Pacific Fleet, where these observation seaplanes were launched from catapults. They spent eight months in this role, but as the squadron went to aircraft carrier operations, the further-aft cockpit proved to have a visibility problem when maneuvering around a carrier deck. In response, the forward cockpit was re-opened, the resulting aircraft being designated FU-2.

By this time they were obsolescent, and the two-seaters served primarily as trainers and utility aircraft.

== Operators ==
Peru

- Peruvian Air Force - Two aircraft.
- Peruvian Navy - Two aircraft.

United States

- United States Navy

== Specifications (FU-1) ==
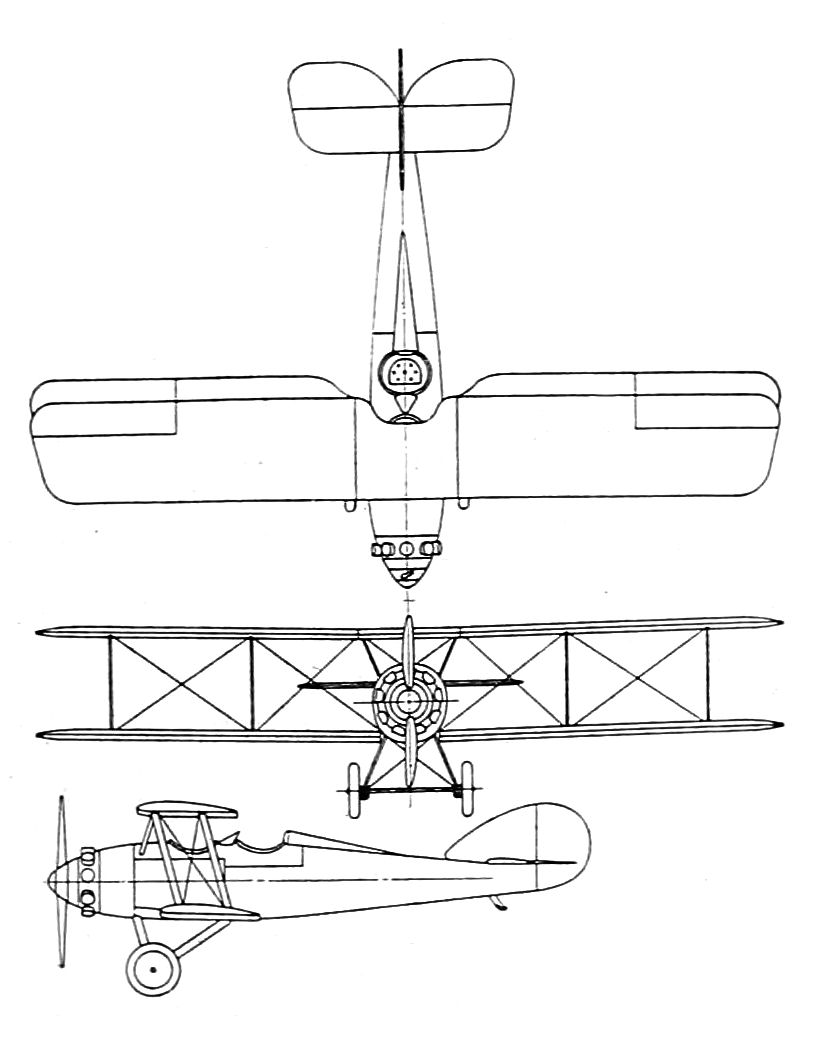
Vought UO-1 3-view drawing from Aero Digest July 1926

Data from United States Navy Aircraft since 1911

General characteristics

- Crew: one
- Length: 28 ft 4.5 in (8.65 m)
- Wingspan: 34 ft 4 in (10.47 m)
- Height: 10 ft 2 in (3.10 m)
- Wing area: 270 sq ft (25.1 m^{2})
- Airfoil: Navy N-9
- Empty weight: 2,074 lb (943 kg)
- Gross weight: 2,774 lb (1,260 kg)
- Powerplant: × Wright J-5 Whirlwind 9 cylinder air cooled radial engine, 220 hp (164 kW)

Performance

- Maximum speed: 106 kn (122 mph, 196 km/h) at sea level
- Range: 357 nmi (410 mi, 660 km)
- Service ceiling: 26,500 ft (8,080 m)
- Wing loading: 10.3 lb/sq ft (50.2 kg/m^{2})
- Power/mass: 0.079 hp/lb (0.13 kW/kg)
- Climb to 5,000 ft (1,520 m): 5 minutes

Armament

- Guns: 2 x .30 in (7.62 mm) machine guns
