= PZL Ł.2 =

Polish Army cooperation and liaison aircraft

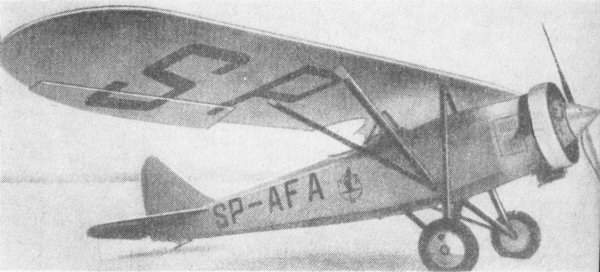
- PZL Ł.2 "Afrykanka" sports aircraft

General information
- Type: Liaison aircraft
- Manufacturer: PZL
- Primary user: Polish Air Force
- Number built: 31

History
- Manufactured: 1930–1931
- First flight: 1930
- Retired: 1935

The PZL Ł.2 was a Polish Army cooperation and liaison aircraft, built in 1929 in the Polskie Zakłady Lotnicze (PZL) in Warsaw. Only a small series of 31 aircraft, including prototype, were made, and used by the Polish Air Force in the 1930s. The aircraft was known in Poland for accomplishing of a long-distance tour around Africa in 1931.

== Development ==
In 1927, the Polish War Ministry opened a contest for a military liaison and observation aircraft. It was meant to operate from casual airfields, used by Army land units. Jerzy Dąbrowski and Franciszek Kott from the PZL works proposed an aircraft, designated initially PZL.2. It was one of the first PZL designs, what was indicated by its low number. The first prototype was flown in early 1930 by Bolesław Orliński (later it received civilian registration SP-ADN).

In 1930 the aircraft was tested and evaluated by the Polish Air Force. Thanks to wing mechanization (flats and slats), it had short take-off and landing. It was very advanced combination of high-lift devices in world's aviation those days. A competing designs Lublin R-X and PWS-5t2, evaluated yet in 1929, were not satisfactory, so the Polish Air Force ordered 60 PZL.2. The aircraft took part in the second contest for an army co-operation aircraft in July 1931. In spite of advanced high-lift devices and all-duralumin construction of the PZL.2, the air force decided to choose a simpler, cheaper and quite satisfactory Lublin R-XIII plane.

An initial order for 60 PZL.2 was finally lowered to 30, which were built between April 1930 and August 1931. The designation changed then to PZL Ł.2 (Ł for "łącznikowy", liaison) or Ł.2a (following an early manner of PZL works to mark the aircraft purpose in designation, after a pursuit PZL P.1). Including the prototype, they carried factory numbers 55.1 – 55.31.

One of the Ł.2, number 55.10 was converted to a long-distance sports aircraft (civilian registration SP-AFA). It had fuel tanks 600 L and a range of over 2000 km. It was also fitted with a Townend ring.

Due to a decrease of orders, there remained parts for several aircraft. In 1930 the PZL proposed to the Polish Navy a liaison and patrol floatplane variant of Ł.2, designated PZL.9, but it was not built. Then, the PZL proposed another patrol and fighter floatplane, basing on Ł.2 parts, PZL.15. It was a low-wing braced monoplane with thin tail boom, and utilized wings, tail and engine of Ł.2. It was not built either. Parts of Ł.2 (wings, tail, engine) were utilized in a passenger aircraft prototype PZL.16.

== Design ==
PZL Ł.2 was a high-wing braced parasol wing monoplane, conventional in layout, of all-metal construction. It had a duralumin framed, canvas covered fuselage (engine part was covered with duralumin). Crew of two was sitting in tandem in open cockpits, with twin controls. The observer had a 7.7 mm Lewis machine gun on a ring mounting. The elliptical wing was two-spar, of duralumin construction, canvas-covered, fitted with slats, flaps and flaperons. Wings could be dismounted for transport. The tail was of duralumin construction, canvas covered. It had a conventional fixed landing gear with a rear skid.

It had a 9-cylinder air-cooled Polish Skoda Works licence-built Wright Whirlwind J-5A radial engine delivering 240 hp (179 kW) at take-off and 220 hp (164 kW) nominal, driving a two-blade wooden propeller, 2.7 m diameter (in SP-AFA – metal one). 190-litre fuel tank in a fuselage (600 L in SP-AFA). Cruise fuel consumption was 45–50 L/h.

== Operational history ==
In May 1930 the prototype PZL.2 was shown by Bolesław Orliński at air meeting in Brno, where it impressed viewers with short landing and minimal speed. After being fitted with a rear machine gun, it was shown at Paris Air Show in December 1930.

Serial aircraft were used by the Polish Air Force as liaison and utility aircraft from 1930, first of all in escadres Nos. 43 and 63. From 1932 they were mostly replaced with Lublin R-XIII and relegated for training, among others in Dęblin. Several were damaged in crashes. Since the aircraft started to suffer from fatigue of rivets in frame joints, they were completely written off by the end of 1935.

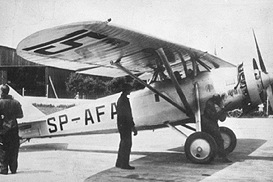
PZL Ł.2 SP-AFA

PZL Ł.2 SP-AFA was used for several long-distance flights. Between 1 February – 5 May 1931 Stanisław Skarżyński with A. Markiewicz flew it on a tour around Africa, on Warsaw – Belgrade – Athens – Cairo – Khartoum – Juba – Kisumu – Elisabethville – Léopoldville – Port-Gentil – Douala – Lagos – Abidjan – Bamako – Dakar – Port Etienne – Casablanca – Alicante – Bordeaux – Paris – Berlin – Warsaw 25,050 km-route (with some other stops). The aircraft was nicknamed Afrykanka then (Polish: the African female), coinciding with the aircraft registration. According to J. Cynk, it was one of the first and greatest international enterprises of the Polish aviation, and it was also one of the most outstanding flights in 1931. The tour proved a durability of the Polish-built aircraft, withstanding different weather conditions and casual airstrips, during 147 flying hours, despite the engine had to be repaired twice on the way. In 7–8 June 1931 Skarżyński flew this aircraft from Poznań in a rally to Bucharest. In July 1932 it hauled Polish gliders SG-21 and SG-28 in international competition in Rhön (piloted by Skarżyński again). The aircraft was written off in autumn 1935.

== Operators ==
Poland

- Polish Air Force operated 29 aircraft.
- PZL company operated two aircraft.

== Specifications ==
Data from Polish Aircraft 1893–1939, Polskie konstrukcje lotnicze 1893–1939

General characteristics

- Crew: 2
- Length: 7.92 m (26 ft 0 in)
- Wingspan: 13.4 m (44 ft 0 in)
- Height: 2.7 m (8 ft 10 in)
- Wing area: 25.8 m^{2} (278 sq ft)
- Airfoil: D.J.3 (modified NACA M12)
- Empty weight: 892 kg (1,967 lb)
- Gross weight: 1,282 kg (2,826 lb)
- Max takeoff weight: 1,730 kg (3,814 lb) (Afrykanka)
- Fuel capacity: 150 L (40 US gal; 33 imp gal) (Afrykanka – 630 L (170 US gal; 140 imp gal))
- Powerplant: 1 × Skoda-Wright J-5 Whirlwind 9-cylinder air-cooled radial piston engine, 160 kW (220 hp)
- Propellers: 2-bladed wooden fixed pitch propeller

Performance

- Maximum speed: 183 km/h (114 mph, 99 kn) at sea level
- Stall speed: 63 km/h (39 mph, 34 kn) slats extended
- Service ceiling: 4,730 m (15,520 ft)
- Time to altitude:
  - 1,000 m (3,300 ft) in 4 minutes 20 seconds
  - 2,000 m (6,600 ft) in 10 minutes 5 seconds
  - 3,000 m (9,800 ft) in 18 minutes 35 seconds
- Take-off run: 55 ma (59 sq ft)
- Landing run: 45 ma (48 sq ft)

Armament

- 1x 7.7 mm (0.303 in) Lewis machine gun in the rear cockpit

== See also ==
Related development

- PZL.16

Aircraft of comparable role, configuration, and era

- Lublin R-X
- Lublin R-XIII
