= Pacer Monoplane =

General information
- Type: Four seat civil transport
- National origin: US
- Manufacturer: Pacer Aircraft Co.
- Designer: Frank R. Seesock

History
- First flight: early 1928

The Pacer Monoplane was a parasol wing, four seat, light aircraft, flown and produced in the US in the late 1920s.

== Design and development ==
The Pacer Monoplane, designed by Frank R. Seesock, was a parasol wing, open cockpit four-seater, offered with a choice of engines. Its wings were rectangular in plan out to tips tapered on their leading edges and were built around twin, solid spars and plywood ribs, with fabric covering. They were joined to the lower fuselage longerons by parallel pairs of struts to the spars at about 2/3 span. These had a broad chord, airfoil section and, with a combined area of 35.5 sq ft (3.30 m^{2}), made a useful contribution to the Pacer's lift. The wing centre-section was held over the fuselage with pairs of longitudinal, vertical, inverted-V cabane struts from the spars to the upper fuselage longerons on each side.

The Pacer was designed to accept a variety of engines with outputs greater than about 100 hp (75 kW) but the first flights were made with a licence-built Hispano-Suiza 8, a water-cooled V-8 dating from 1914 developed to produce 180 hp (130 kW). It had a "tunnel type" radiator mounted under the engine and a 90 US gal (75 imp gal; 340 L) fuel tank in the wing centre-section. Behind the engine the fuselage had a flat-sided, welded steel tube structure with fabric covering. The upper fuselage had a curved decking. Each wide, open cockpit seated two side by side; the forward cockpit, under the wing, was accessed through a door and the rear, from which it was flown, was almost under a trailing edge gently cut away to improve the upward, forward field of view and offered dual controls with a Y-type, central column. Aft, a straight-tapered, round-tipped tailplane was mounted on top of the fuselage and braced from below with a pair of parallel struts to the lower longeron on each side. The elevators were similar in plan but with a large cut-out for rudder movement. The fin was trapezoidal in profile and its round-topped balanced rudder had a vertical trailing edge.

Its split-axle main undercarriage had its steel tube axles, legs and drag struts mounted on the lower longerons. The wheels were large and the track wide. There was a short tailskid.

== Operational history ==
The date of the first flight is not known but was well before April 1928, when some results of test flights with the Hispano engine, including a trial carrying four and their baggage, had been released. Pacer intended production at their Fords, New Jersey factory to begin on 15 April and had appointed two agencies committed to purchase production aircraft, one to cover New York and the other New York State. At the same time a Whirlwind-powered airframe was being completed for the Detroit Air Show and for flight shortly afterwards. Production continued until 1930, though only two are known from US civil registers. One, registered in 1928, was powered by a 220 hp (160 kW) Wright J-5 Whirlwind and the other, registered in 1930, by a 300 hp (220 kW) J-6 Whirlwind.

== Specifications (Whirlwind J-5) ==
Data from Aero Digest (April 1928)

General characteristics

- Crew: one
- Capacity: three passengers
- Length: 22 ft 9 in (6.93 m)
- Wingspan: 32 ft 6 in (9.91 m)
- Height: 8 ft 7 in (2.62 m)
- Wing area: 200 sq ft (19 m^{2})
- Fuel capacity: 70 US gal (58 imp gal; 260 L)
- Powerplant: × Wright Whirlwind J-5 9-cylinder radial, 220 hp (160 kW)

Performance

- Maximum speed: 147 mph (237 km/h, 128 kn)
- Cruise speed: 120 mph (190 km/h, 100 kn)
- Range: 750 mi (1,210 km, 650 nmi)
- Service ceiling: 21,000 ft (6,400 m)
- Rate of climb: 1,650 ft/min (8.4 m/s)
