= Lublin R-XVI =

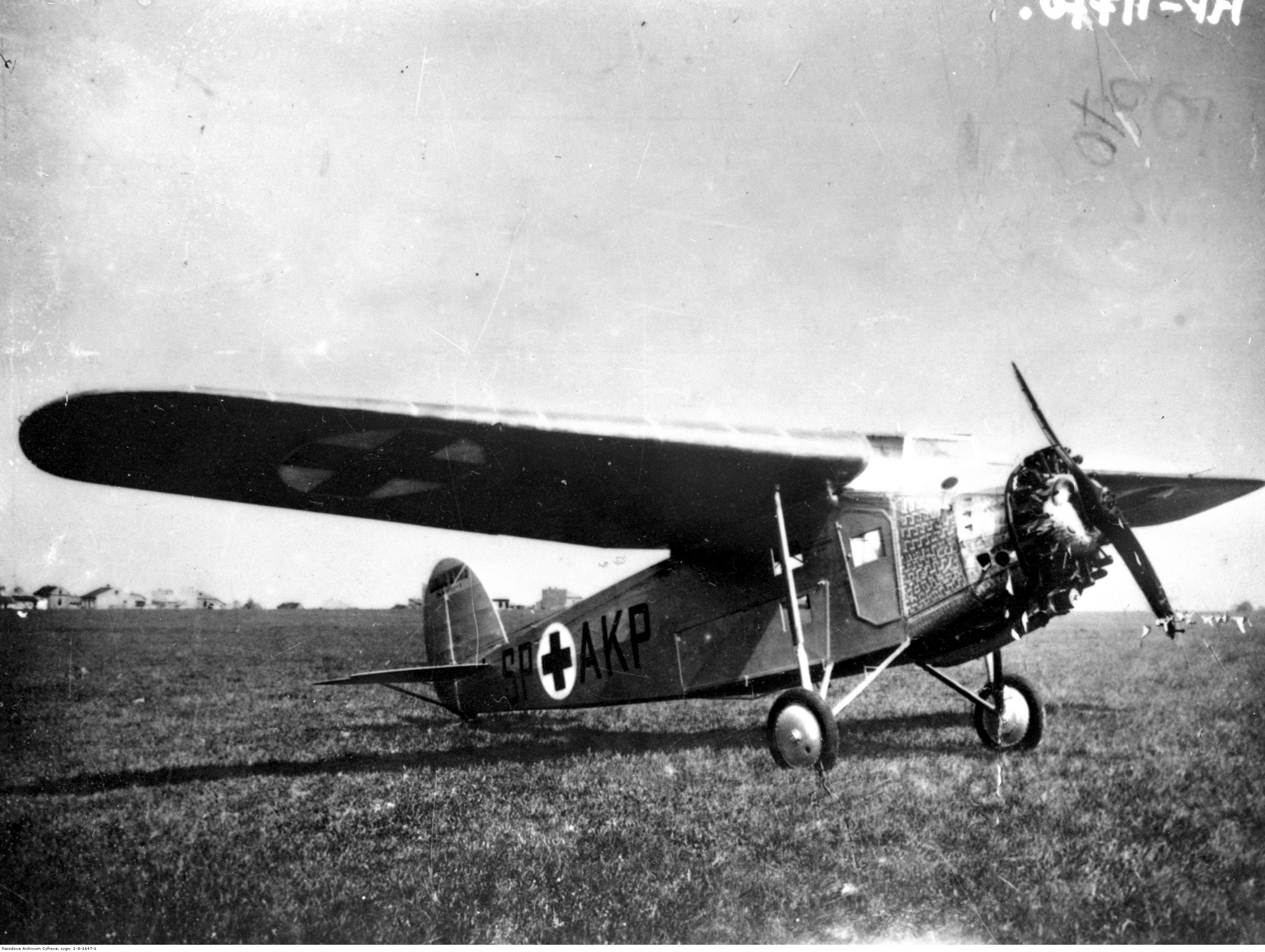

General information
- Type: Passenger plane & Air ambulance
- National origin: Poland
- Manufacturer: Plage i Laśkiewicz
- Primary user: Polish Red Cross
- Number built: 7

History
- Manufactured: 1935
- First flight: February 1932

The Lublin R-XVI was a Polish passenger and air ambulance aircraft, designed in the 1930s in the Plage i Laśkiewicz factory in Lublin and built in a small series.

== Design and development ==
The Lublin R-XVI was conceived as a small 4-seater passenger plane, ordered by the Polish Ministry of Communications. It was a development of an unsuccessful Lublin R-XI design. The main designer was Jerzy Rudlicki. The new plane was lighter and introduced a trapezoid-shaped wing instead of an elliptical one. Both designs were partly modeled on a construction of Fokker F.VII, produced under licence by Plage i Laśkiewicz. The first prototype was flown in February 1932. In the same year it was evaluated by the LOT Polish Airlines, flying 12,500 km.

The R-XVI took part in a contest for a successor of Junkers F.13 planes in LOT airlines. The contest was won by PWS-24, because the construction of the R-XVI had to be strengthened, what reduced its payload to 546 kg. This had to reduce its range or number of passengers carried. The prototype R-XVI was modified in the factory by November 1933 (it was also called R-XVIa then). It returned to LOT airlines, but was not used much and was scrapped in 1936.

Rudlicki next developed an air ambulance variant R-XVIb. Its prototype was flown in May 1933 (registration SP-AKP). The plane was evaluated by the Army as quite successful, and a series of 5 air ambulances were ordered and built in 1935. They had registrations SP-AOH to AOM, and, along with the prototype, military numbers 11-1 - 11-6.

== Operational history ==
Between June 1–4, 1933 the prototype R-XVIb took part in the 2nd International Air Ambulance Contest in Madrid in Spain, and won first place and Maurice Raphaël's Cup.

All R-XVIb's were used from 1935 by the Polish Red Cross (PCK), which operated military ambulances in Poland. In 1936 they were removed from the registry, but some served longer after repair and change of registration numbers (among others SP-BNO, BNP, BNR). Some were given military markings then.

Between July 1 and July 4, 1938, one R-XVIb took part in an International Air Ambulance Contest in Esch in Luxembourg, where it performed a parachute jump of three-person medical rescue group (including two women).

The R-XVIb's were used during the German invasion on Poland in 1939. At least one (SP-BNO) with light damage was captured by the Germans. Their fate during the World War II is not known. None survived the war.

== Operators ==
Poland

- Polish Red Cross
- Polish Air Force

== Description ==
The R-XVI was a mixed construction cantilever high-wing monoplane, conventional in layout. It had a steel framed, canvas covered fuselage (engine part covered with duralumin) and a single-piece, plywood covered, two-spar wing of wooden construction. The tail was of steel construction, canvas covered. It had a conventional fixed landing gear, with a rear skid, base 2.68 m. in The closed cabin had a capacity of six: a pilot, a mechanic and 4 passengers (R-XVIa) or four: a pilot, a doctor, and two lying on stretchers (R-XVIb).

It had a 9-cylinder air-cooled Polish Skoda Works Wright Whirlwind J-5 radial engine delivering 240 hp (179 kW) take-off power and 220 hp (164 kW) nominal power, driving a two-blade propeller. A 250-litre fuel tank was fitted in wing (normal capacity: 180 L). The cruise fuel consumption was 50 L/h.

== Specifications (R-XVIb) ==
Data from Polish Aircraft 1893–1939

General characteristics

- Crew: 1
- Capacity: 4 pax / 2 stretchers with medical attendant
- Length: 10.08 m (33 ft 1 in)
- Wingspan: 14.93 m (49 ft 0 in)
- Height: 2.96 m (9 ft 9 in)
- Wing area: 30.5 m^{2} (328 sq ft)
- Aspect ratio: 7
- Airfoil: 15% t/c ratio
- Empty weight: 1,150 kg (2,535 lb)
- Gross weight: 1,630 kg (3,594 lb)
- Fuel capacity: 256 L (68 US gal; 56 imp gal) in a wing tank
- Powerplant: 1 × Polish-Skoda J-5 Whirlwind 9-cylinder air-cooled radial piston engine, 160 kW (220 hp)
- Propellers: 2-bladed Standard Steel fixed-pitch metal propeller or Szomański fixed-pitch wooden propeller

Performance

- Maximum speed: 190 km/h (120 mph, 100 kn) at sea level

168 km/h (104 mph; 91 kn) at 4,000 m (13,000 ft)

- Range: 800 km (500 mi, 430 nmi)
- Service ceiling: 4,460 m (14,630 ft)
- Time to altitude: 1,000 m (3,300 ft) in 6 minutes 30 seconds
- Wing loading: 53.4 kg/m^{2} (10.9 lb/sq ft)
- Power/mass: 0.1008 kW/kg (0.0613 hp/lb)
- Take-off run: 185 m (607 ft)
- Landing run: 80 m (260 ft)

== See also ==
- LWS-2
