= Heinkel HD 20 =

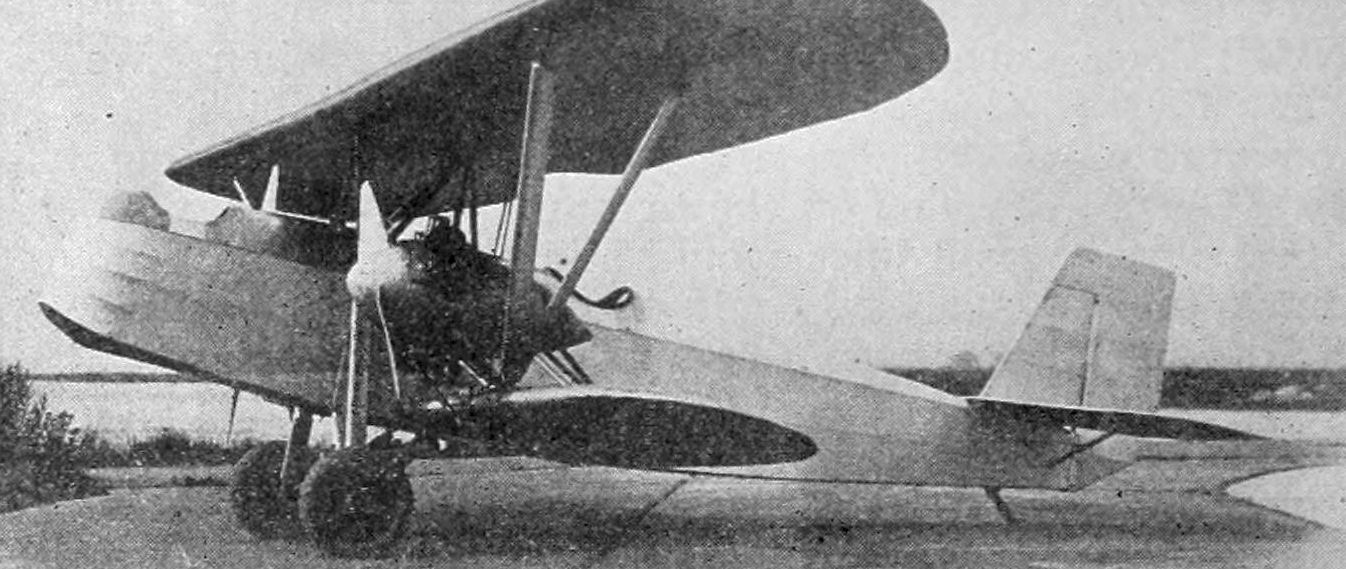

General information
- Type: Three seat photographic survey and mapping aircraft
- National origin: Germany
- Manufacturer: Heinkel Flugzeugwerke
- Number built: At least one

History
- First flight: c.1926

The Heinkel HD 20 was a twin engine, three seat German biplane built in 1926 for civil survey work.

== Design and development ==
The Heinkel HD 20 was one of the early products of post-World War I aircraft companies after the Allies aviation ban was lifted. HD stood for German: Heinkel Doppeldecker or Heinkel biplane.

The HD.20 had unswept wings of mixed construction with wooden spars, two in the upper wing and one in the lower, and steel ribs; they were fabric covered. Both wings had constant chord over the inner section and semi-elliptical outer panels. The upper wing was considerably the larger, with 45% greater overall span and 17% greater chord over the inner panels. The wings were mounted with slight and equal dihedral and considerable stagger. Only the upper wings carried the long span, narrow chord ailerons. The lower wings were mounted directly onto the lower fuselage structure and the upper wing centre-section was joined to the upper fuselage with a pair of steel inverted V-struts on each side and a central parallel pair arranged transversely. It was a single bay biplane with V-form interplane struts leaning outward strongly from the lower wing below the engines to the upper wings at about 55% span.

It was powered by two 150 kW (200 hp) Wright R-790 Whirlwind nine cylinder radial engines, mounted in streamlined cowlings with the cylinder heads protruding for cooling. They were fed from fuel tanks in the upper wing; oil tanks were in the cowlings. Each engine was bolted to a frame formed of the interplane struts, a nearly horizontal V-strut to the upper fuselage and an N-form strut from the lower wing to the upper fuselage.

The square cross-section fuselage was formed with steel tubes and covered with fabric, with a light, rounded, wooden upper decking. There were three open cockpits: one in the nose, another under the upper wing and the last, from which it was flown, just behind the upper trailing edge which had a shallow, rounded cut-out to aid the pilot's forward view. The tail surfaces were conventional and straight-edged, with angled leading edges and unswept trailing edges. The tailplane, mounted on the upper fuselage, was braced from below to the fuselage with a single strut on each side. Both the rudder and elevators were balanced; the latter were separate, their inner corners cut away for deflections of the deep rudder.

The HD.20 had a conventional tailskid undercarriage. Each mainwheel was mounted on a group of three struts, two to the lower fuselage longeron at points on the wing leading edge and at mid-chord and the third to the upper longeron. There was a solid rubber shock absorber in each hub. The wheels could be replaced with floats.

== Operational history ==
Rather little is known about the history of the HD 20. From the January 1927 date of the Les Ailles article the first flight was probably in later 1926. The number built is also not known. One (D-1157), which appears on a reconstructed civil register, was owned by the Epro advertising agency and was destroyed on 21 November 1929. The HD.20 is also mentioned as a photographic survey aircraft in a 1930 review of the topic, though it does not show the camera positions.

== Specifications ==
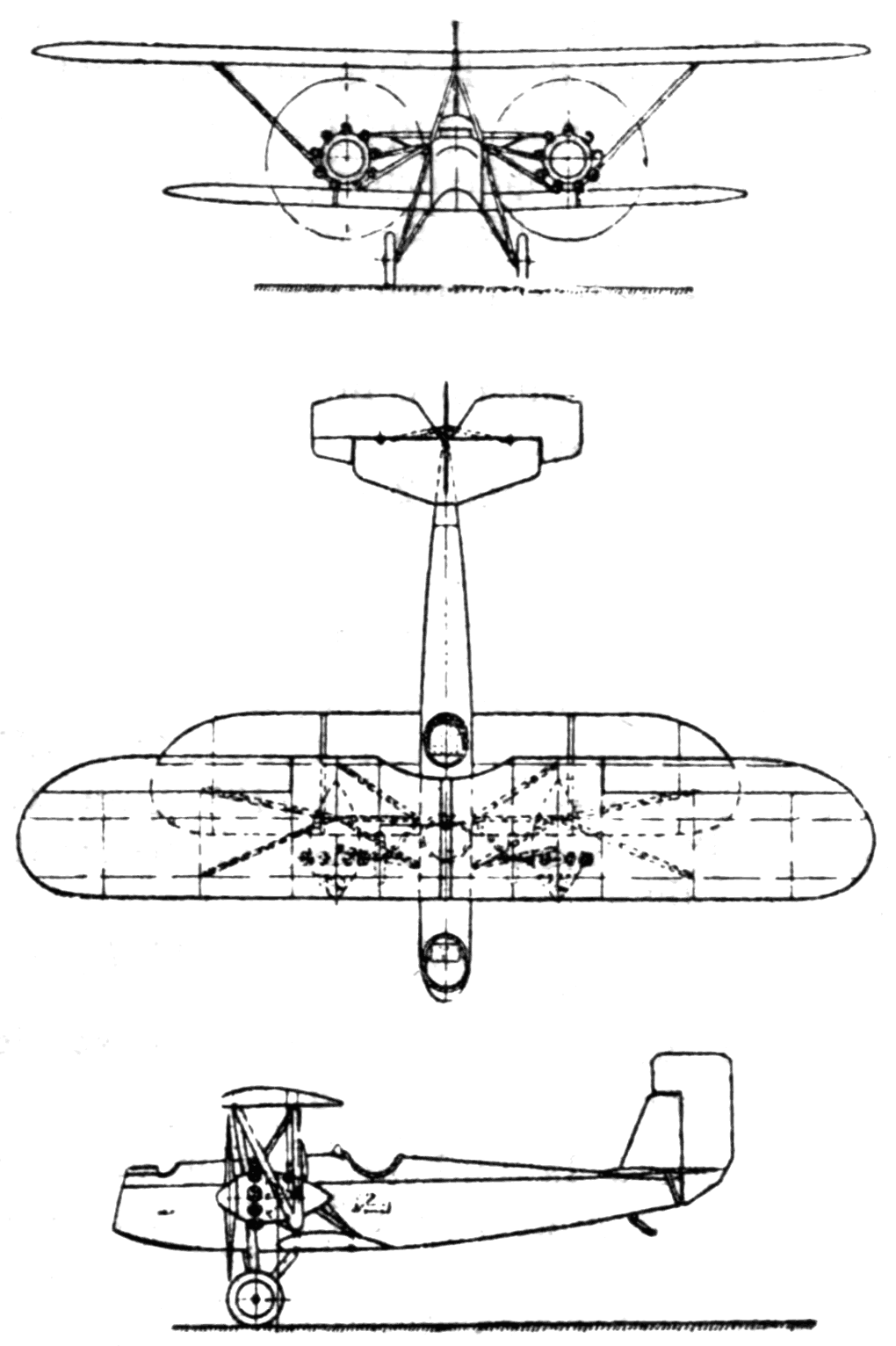
Heinkel HD 20 3-view drawing from Le Document aéronautique December,1926

Data from Les Ailes, 6 January 1927

General characteristics

- Crew: Three
- Length: 9.45 m (31 ft 0 in)
- Upper wingspan: 12.80 m (42 ft 0 in)
- Lower wingspan: 8.80 m (28 ft 10 in)
- Height: 3.52 m (11 ft 7 in)
- Wing area: 39.80 m^{2} (428.4 sq ft)
- Empty weight: 1,315 kg (2,899 lb)
- Gross weight: 1,965 kg (4,332 lb)
- Fuel capacity: 340 L (75 imp gal; 90 US gal)
- Powerplant: 2 × Wright R-790 Whirlwind 9-cylinder radial, 150 kW (200 hp) each
- Propellers: 2-bladed metal, Reed Propellers

Performance

- Maximum speed: 195 km/h (121 mph, 105 kn) at 500 m (1,600 ft)
- Cruise speed: 180 km/h (110 mph, 97 kn)
- Minimum control speed: 85 km/h (53 mph, 46 kn)
- Endurance: 4.5 hr
- Service ceiling: 6,000 m (20,000 ft)
- Time to altitude: 35 min to 5,000 m (16,000 ft)
