= Lublin R-XII =

Polish three-seat sports and touring aircraft

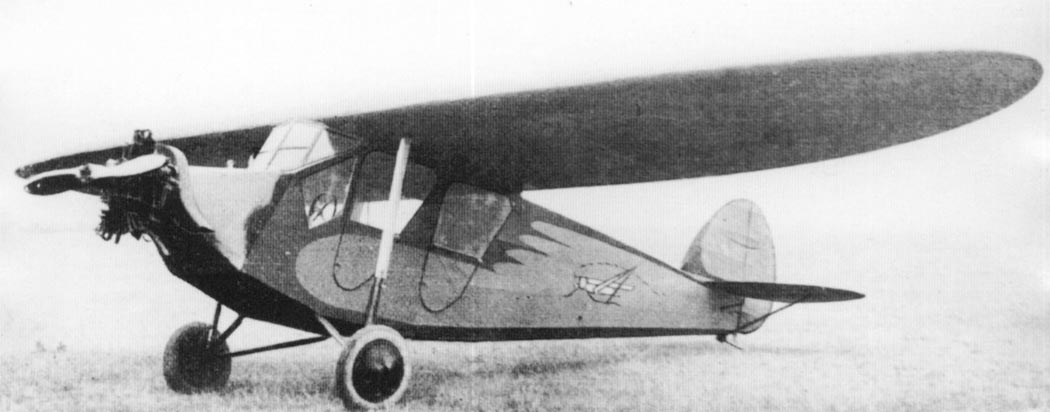

General information
- Type: Sports and touring aircraft
- National origin: Poland
- Manufacturer: Plage i Laśkiewicz
- Status: prototype
- Primary user: Poland
- Number built: 1

History
- First flight: Autumn 1930

The Lublin R-XII was a Polish three-seat sports and touring aircraft, designed in 1930 in the Plage i Laśkiewicz factory in Lublin, that remained a prototype.

== Design and development ==
Plage i Laśkiewicz works was among factories, that developed sports aircraft for an order of the LOPP paramilitary organization. Its design, the Lublin R-XII, was basically a scaled down passenger aircraft Lublin R-XI. The main designer was Jerzy Rudlicki. The only prototype was flown in autumn 1930 (registration SP-AFB). It was not built in series.

The aircraft was not successful and its performance was not satisfactory because of too much weight. It did not take part in the 3rd Polish Light Aircraft contest because of a weight limit. It was owned by the factory and little used, after a few years it was scrapped. The R-XII was the only sports aircraft of Plage i Laśkiewicz.

== Description ==
A mixed construction cantilever high-wing monoplane, single-engine, conventional in layout. It had a steel framed, canvas covered fuselage (engine part covered with duralumin) and a single-piece, plywood-covered, two-spar elliptical wing of wooden construction. The empennage was of steel construction, canvas covered. In a closed cabin under the wing there were two places side-by-side, with double controls, behind them was the third seat or a place for baggage. The cabin had single door on the left and front and rear doors on the right. It had a conventional fixed landing gear, with a rear skid, the main gear was joined with wings by vertical struts with oil and air shock absorbers. It had a single 5-cylinder air-cooled Armstrong-Siddeley Genet uncovered radial engine in front, delivering 88 hp (66 kW) take-off power and 80 hp (60 kW) nominal power, driving a two-blade propeller. A fuel tank was in the fuselage. The cruise fuel consumption was 21 L/h (4.6 imp gal/h).

== Specifications ==
Data from Jane's all the World's Aircraft 1931, Polskie konstrukcje lotnicze 1893-1939, Polish Aircraft 1893–1939

General characteristics

- Crew: 1
- Capacity: 2 or 3
- Length: 7.62 m (25 ft 0 in)
- Wingspan: 11.5 m (37 ft 9 in)
- Height: 2.36 m (7 ft 9 in)
- Wing area: 18.54 m^{2} (199.6 sq ft)
- Empty weight: 503.5 kg (1,110 lb)
- Gross weight: 828.5 kg (1,827 lb)
- Powerplant: 1 × Armstrong Siddeley Genet 5-cylinder air-cooled radial piston engine 80–88 hp (60–66 kW)
- Propellers: 2-bladed Szomański fixed pitch propeller

Performance

- Maximum speed: 156 km/h (97 mph, 84 kn) at sea level
- Landing speed: 73 km/h (45 mph; 39 kn)
- Cruise speed: 135 km/h (84 mph, 73 kn)
- Range: 550 km (340 mi, 300 nmi)
- Service ceiling: 4,750 m (15,580 ft)
- Rate of climb: 4.3 m/s (850 ft/min)
- Wing loading: 44.8 kg/m^{2} (9.2 lb/sq ft)
- Fuel consumption: 0.109 kg/km (0.39 lb/mi)
- Power/mass: 12.6 kg/kW (20.7 lb/hp)

== See also ==
Related development

- Lublin R-XI

Aircraft of comparable role, configuration, and era

- Potez 36
