= RX II =

History

Norway
- Name: RX II
- Owner: Lars Ingeberg
- Builder: Designed by Jerry Cartwright, built at Coddington Yachts, Newport
- Cost: usd 100.000
- Launched: 1977
- Notes: NOR 12152

General characteristics
- Class & type: Fiberglass yacht
- Displacement: ca. 9 000 kg displacement
- Length: 10,97 m LOA
- Beam: 3,08 m
- Draught: 1,70 m
- Propulsion: Volvo 2030 engine, 30 HP
- Complement: Crew of 3

RX II is a 36-foot yacht in which a three-man Norwegian crew circumnavigated the North Pole over two seasons in 2009–2010.

Expedition initiated by Lars Ingeberg and Trond Aasvoll after studying the changes in the sea ice around the Arctic Circle. Expedition leader Trond Aasvoll and crew Hans Fredrik Haukland and Finn Andreassen left Vardø, Norway, on 28 July 2009, intending to make the first circumnavigation of the North Pole in one season and thereby demonstrate the effects of global warming in making this possible. The northern sea route proved ice-free and RX II entered the Bering Strait on 24 September. The voyage had been projected to take 45 days. However, the Russian authorities stopped them in sight of Alaska and required them to sail south to satisfy legal formalities, leaving insufficient time to sail all the way around the Pole in one season. The expedition was interrupted in Nome, Alaska and returned to the home base of Arendal to overwinter. However, RX II was the smallest sailboat to sail through the Northeast Passage, and the first Norwegian boat to do so since Roald Amundsen in 1916–1919.

The crew returned to Nome the next summer and left on 31 July 2010. They successfully navigated the Northwest Passage west to east. Haukland had to leave RX II when she reached Greenland and fly back to his job as a firefighter in Alta. However, Aasvoll and Andreassen re-entered Norwegian waters on 29 September after sailing around the northern tip of Scotland, and returned to Arendal on 9 October. RX II became the first Norwegian boat to sail both the Northeast and Northwest Passages with the same crew. Later the same year, the Norwegian Northern Passage and the Russian Peter I both completed the circumnavigation in one season.

The 36-foot fiberglass yacht with an open cockpit was designed by Jerry Cartwright and built in 1977.
