= Townend ring =

Propeller aircraft cowling

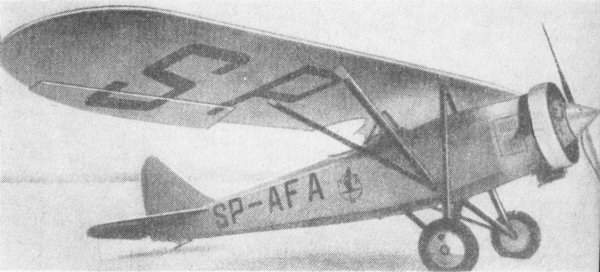
Polish sports plane PZL Ł.2 with a Townend ring

A Townend ring is a narrow-chord cowling ring fitted around the cylinders of an aircraft radial engine to reduce drag and improve cooling. It was patented in 1929, and found use on various aircraft of the 1930s and into the 1940s.

== Development ==
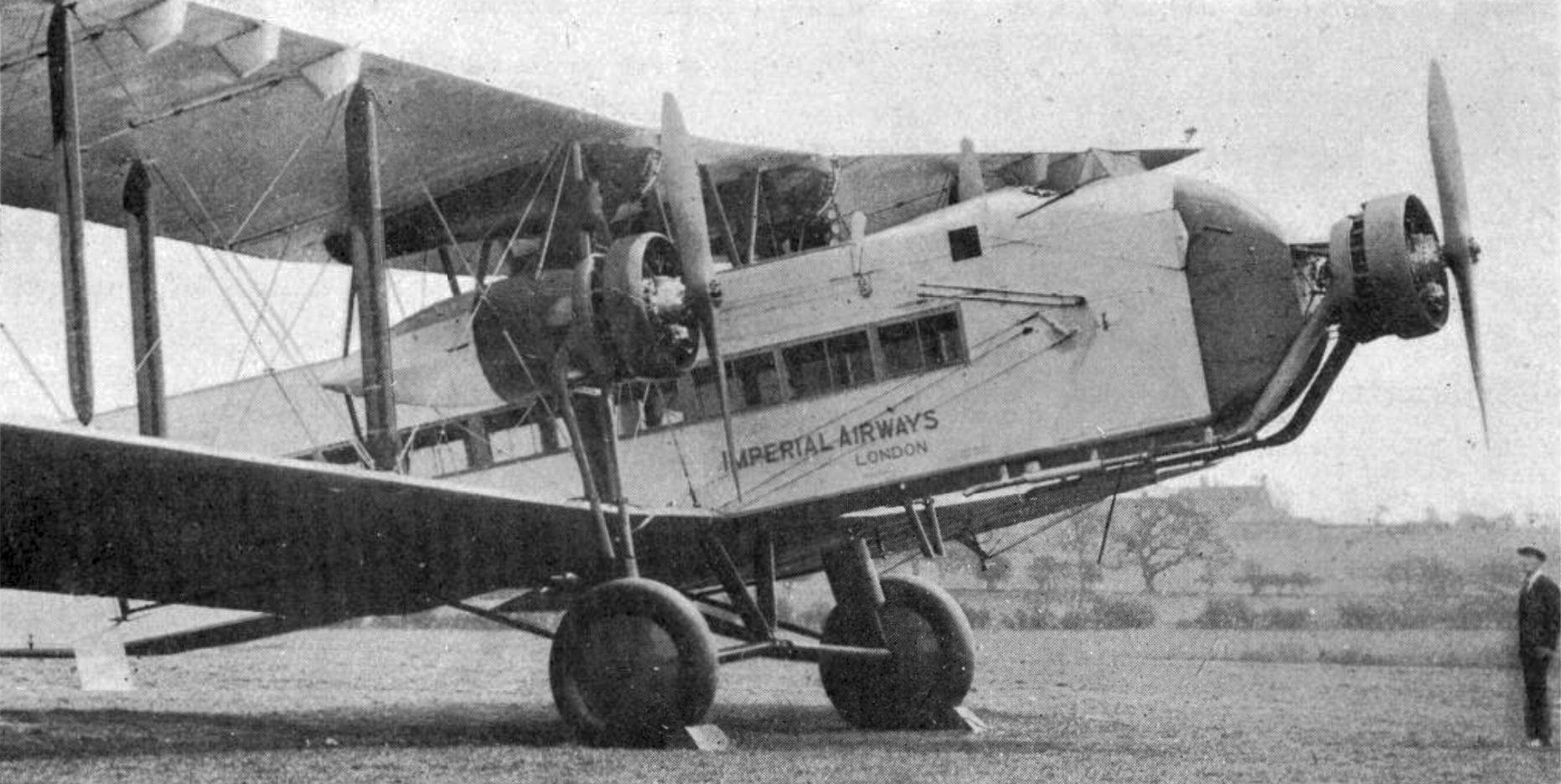
An Argosy in 1929, with townend rings

The Townend ring was the invention of Dr. Hubert Townend of the British National Physical Laboratory in 1929. Patents were supported by Boulton & Paul Ltd in 1929. In the United States it was often called a "drag ring". It caused a reduction in the drag of radial engines and was widely used in high-speed designs of 1930–1935, before the long-chord NACA cowling came into general use. Despite suggestions of it exploiting the Meredith effect, low airspeeds, low temperature differences and small mass flows make that unlikely, particularly when combined with the lack of flow control as the air exits the cowling. Although superior to earlier cowlings, and uncowled engines in terms of drag and cooling, above 217 kn (402 km/h; 250 mph) the NACA cowling was more efficient and soon replaced it in general use.

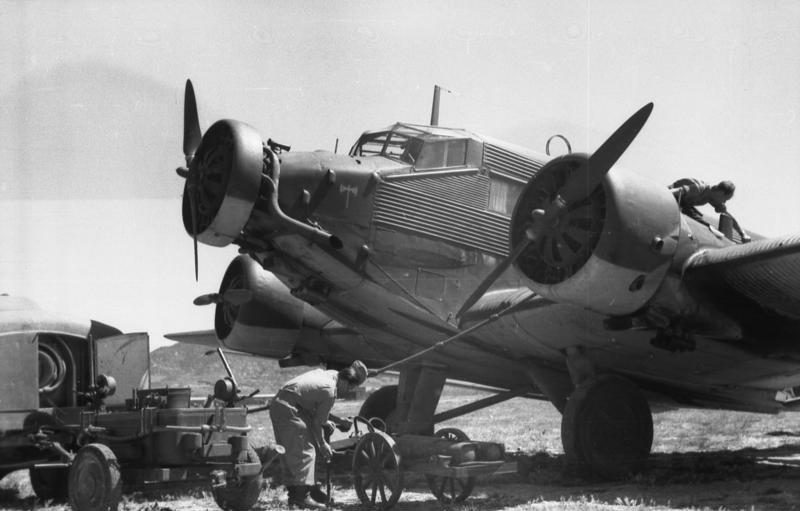
A Luftwaffe Ju 52/3m being serviced in Crete in 1943: Note the narrow-chord Townend ring on the central engine and the deeper-chord NACA cowlings on the wing engines.

Examples of aircraft with Townend rings include the Boeing P-26 Peashooter, the Vickers Wellesley, the Fokker D.XVI and the central engine on the Junkers Ju 52/3m. (Note: The wing engines of the Ju 52 had longer NACA cowlings, but the central engine only had space for the shorter Townend ring.)
