= Wright R-790 Whirlwind =

Series of nine cylinder air-cooled radial aircraft engines

R-790 Whirlwind
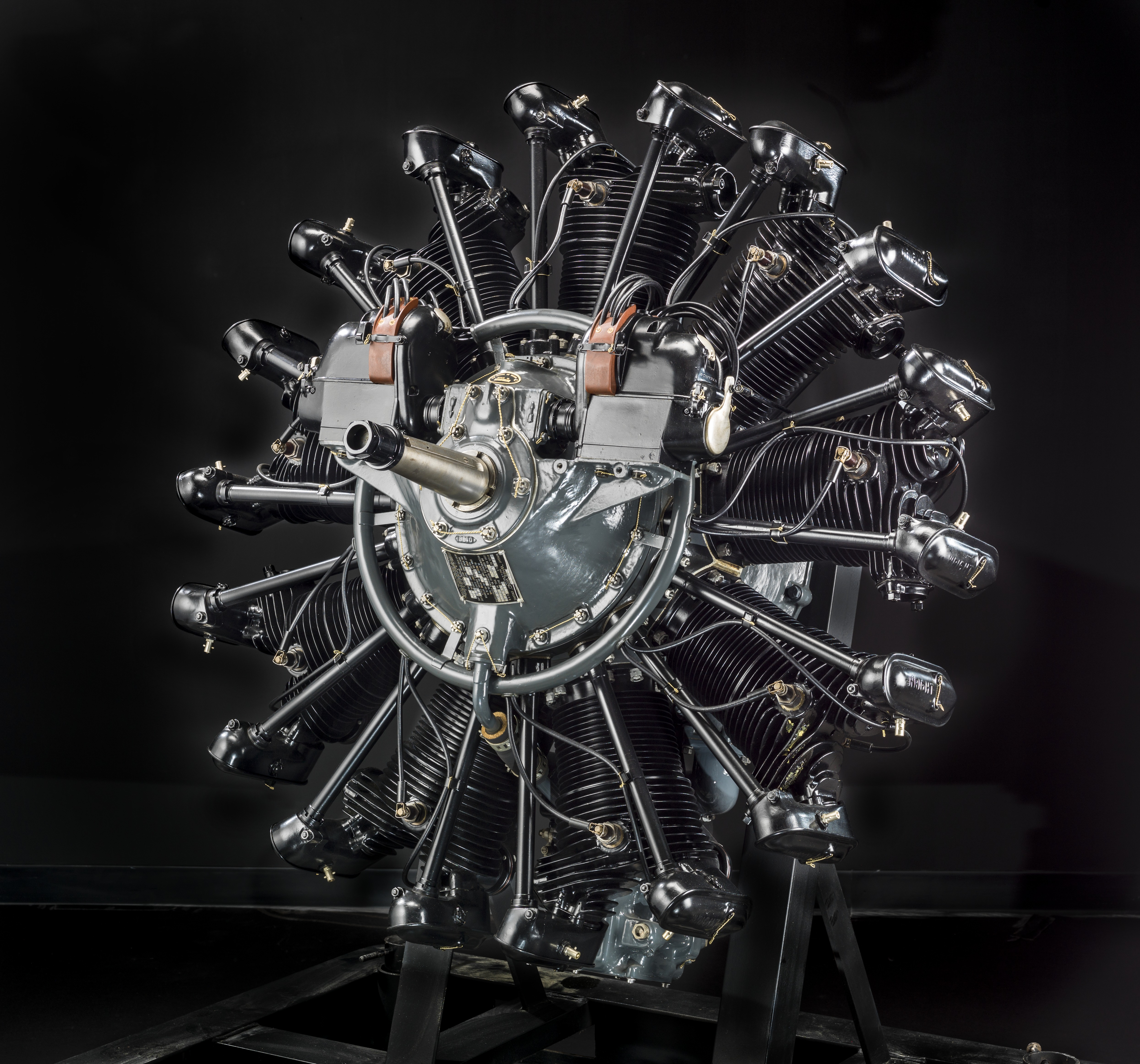
- Wright R-790 (J-5 Whirlwind) at National Air and Space Museum
- Type: Air-cooled 9-cylinder radial piston engine
- National origin: United States
- Manufacturer: Wright Aeronautical Corporation; Škoda Works (Czechoslovakia); Avia (Poland)
- First run: 1923
- Major applications: Spirit of St. Louis; Fokker Trimotor; Ford Trimotor
- Manufactured: 1923–1929
- Number built: 3,339 (Note: Includes J1, J3, J4A, J4B and J5. Does not include license built engines.)

The Wright R-790 Whirlwind was a series of nine-cylinder air-cooled radial aircraft engines built by Wright Aeronautical Corporation, with a total displacement of about 790 cubic inches (12.9 L) and around 200 horsepower (150 kW). These engines were the earliest members of the Wright Whirlwind engine family.

== Design and development ==
The R-790 Whirlwind began as the Lawrance J-1, a nine-cylinder air-cooled radial developed in 1921 by the Lawrance Aero Engine Company for the U.S. Navy. The Navy was very enthusiastic about air-cooled engines, which it considered better suited for naval use than liquid-cooled ones. Lawrance was a small company, though, and the Navy doubted it could produce enough engines for its needs. Despite urgings from the Navy, the major U.S. aircraft engine makers, Wright and Curtiss, were satisfied with their liquid-cooled engines and showed no interest in building air-cooled engines. Since the Navy was already a major buyer of Wright engines, it pressured Wright into purchasing Lawrance and building the J-1 itself, by informing the company that the Navy would buy no more of its existing engines or spare parts. To retain the Navy's business, Wright complied in 1923 and the Lawrance J-1 became the Wright J-1.

By the time Lawrance merged with Wright, it had already developed the more powerful J-2, a version of the J-1 with slightly enlarged bore and displacement. However, Lawrance decided the J-1 was large enough, and the J-2 never went into production; only two examples were built.

Over the next two years, Wright gradually refined the J-1 engine, introducing the J-3, J-4, J-4A, and J-4B. The changes improved the engine's reliability, cooling, and fuel consumption, but the basic design, dimensions, and performance were unaltered.

The J-4 was the first engine to bear the Whirlwind name; previous engines used only the alphanumeric code.

The J-5 Whirlwind, introduced in 1925, was a complete redesign of the engine with greatly improved cooling and breathing, further increasing its reliability and reducing fuel consumption. Among the visible changes was the much wider separation between the valves, for better cooling airflow, and completely enclosed, instead of exposed pushrods and rocker arms.

The U.S. government later designated the J-5 Whirlwind as the R-790, but it did not apply this designation to the older engines.

All these engines had a bore of 4.5 in (11.4 cm), a stroke of 5.5 in (14.0 cm), and a displacement of 788 in^{3} (12.91 L).

In a 1928 report on transcontinental aviation, the author disclosed the cost of a typical five-seat commercial aircraft as $12,500, of which $5,000 was for one of the 350 200 hp Whirlwind Engines available that year. The J-5 was the last of the original nine-cylinder Whirlwinds. In 1928, it was replaced by the seven-cylinder Whirlwind J-6.

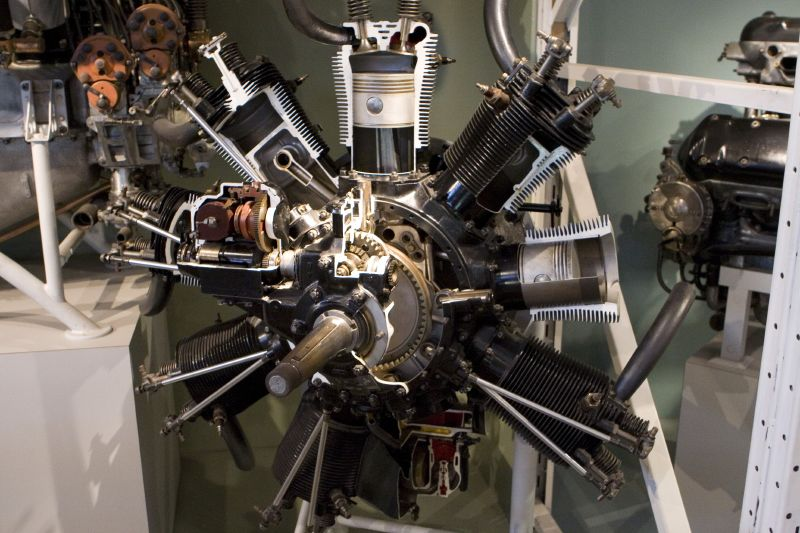
Partially sectioned Wright J-4B at Canada Aviation Museum

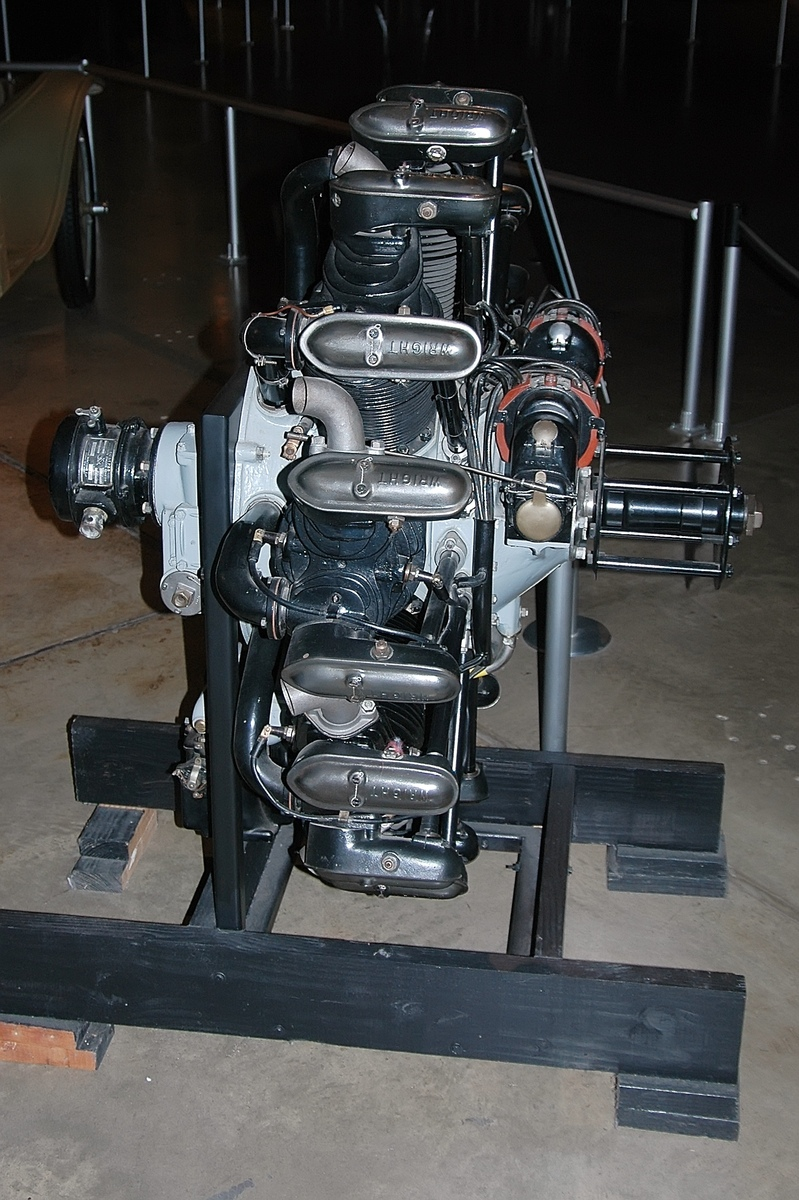
Side view of the USAF museum's R-790 (J-5)

== Operational history ==
Many Whirlwind engines were used in U.S. Navy aircraft, mostly in trainers, but also in some ship-based observation and fighter aircraft. As the engines were refined and their reputation for reliability grew, their use expanded to U.S. Army trainers and a wide range of U.S. civil aircraft, including the earliest versions of the Fokker Trimotor and Ford Trimotor airliners.

The reliability of J-5 Whirlwind engines also led aviators to use them for a number of record-setting distance and endurance flights. The most famous of these is Charles Lindbergh's solo transatlantic flight from New York City to Paris on May 20–21, 1927, in the Spirit of St. Louis, powered by a single Whirlwind J-5C. During Lindbergh's flight, the engine ran continuously for 33.5 hours. Lindbergh's achievement greatly boosted the Whirlwind's already good reputation.

Some other historic long-duration flights made in aircraft powered by the J-5 Whirlwind:

- Clarence Chamberlin and Bert Acosta made a record endurance flight of 51 hours, 11 minutes, 25 seconds in a single-engined Wright-Bellanca WB-2 over New York City in April 1927.
- Chamberlin and Charles Levine flew nonstop from New York City to Eisleben, Germany, in the same Wright-Bellanca on June 4–6, 1927, in a flight lasting 42.5 hours (3,920 mi).
- The first successful flight from the continental U.S. to Hawaii was made by Albert Hegenberger and Lester Maitland in the Fokker C-2 Bird of Paradise from Oakland, California, to Honolulu, Hawaii, on June 28–29, 1927, lasting 25 hours 50 minutes (2,400 mi).
- The first flight across the Pacific was made by Sir Charles Kingsford Smith in the Fokker Trimotor Southern Cross from Oakland to Brisbane, Australia, with stops in Hawaii and Fiji, from May 31 to June 9, 1928. The leg from Hawaii to Fiji lasted 34.5 hours over 3,100 mi (5,000 km) of open ocean.
- A record endurance flight of 150 hours, 40 minutes, and 14 seconds was made by U.S. Army fliers in the Fokker C-2A Question Mark trimotor over Southern California on January 1–7, 1929. Achieved with the help of aerial refueling, this flight ended only when valvetrain failures stopped the portside engine, and excessive valvetrain wear was slowing the nose and starboard-side radials.

Charles L. Lawrance, who developed the original Whirlwind series and became president of Wright, won the 1927 Collier Trophy for his work on air-cooled radial aircraft engines.

== License-built versions ==
The J-5 Whirlwind was built by Hispano-Suiza in France.

The Whirlwind J-5 was also produced under license in Poland by several makers. Among these were Polskie Zakłady Skody, the Polish branch of Škoda Works, which built about 350 to 400 engines from 1929 to 1931, and the Polish firm Avia, which manufactured a further 300 engines from 1935 to 1938. Polish-built J-5s were used in numerous Polish aircraft, mostly in military training, observation, and liaison aircraft.

== Variants ==
J-1
Lawrance J-1 as built by Wright Aeronautical in 1923.
J-3
Wright's first refined version, 1923.
J-4
Improved version, 1924. First to be named "Whirlwind".
J-4A, J-4B
Further refinements of J-4.
J-5 (R-790)
Complete redesign with improved reliability and performance, 1925.

== Applications ==
=== U.S. aircraft ===
- Boeing NB
- Buhl-Verville CA-3 Airster (J-4)
- Buhl-Verville CA-3A Airster (J-5)
- Consolidated NY
- Consolidated O-17
- Consolidated PT-3
- Curtiss AT-5 Hawk
- Curtiss N2C-1 Fledgling
- Curtiss-Wright CW-14 Osprey
- Fairchild FC-2
- Fokker F.VII
- Fokker Universal
- Ford Trimotor 4-AT
- Keystone Pronto
- Lockheed Vega
- Hamilton H-18
- Naval Aircraft Factory N3N-1 Canary
- New Standard D-25
- Pacer Monoplane
- Pitcairn Mailwing
- Ryan B-1 Brougham
- Spirit of St. Louis
- Stearman NS-1
- Stearman C2B
- Stearman C3B
- Stinson Detroiter SB-1 and SM-1
- Stinson Junior SM-2AB
- Swallow New Swallow
- Texas-Temple Aero C-4
- Texas-Temple Commercial Wing
- Travel Air 2000
- Travel Air 3000
- Travel Air 4000
- Vought FU
- Vought UO
- Waco 10

=== Polish aircraft, using Polish-built engines ===
- Bartel BM-5d
- Lublin R-X
- Lublin R-XIII
- PWS-18
- PWS-26
- PZL Ł.2

=== Aircraft from other countries ===
- Heinkel HD.20
- Nieuport-Delage NiD 640

== Engines on display ==
Some museums which have J-5 Whirlwinds (or the military R-790 equivalents) on display:

- National Air and Space Museum in Washington, D.C.
- National Museum of the United States Air Force near Dayton, Ohio. (This engine, also pictured above, was one of the three used by Bird of Paradise on its flight to Hawaii.)
- National Museum of Naval Aviation near Pensacola, Florida.
- EAA AirVenture Museum in Oshkosh, Wisconsin.
- Old Rhinebeck Aerodrome in Rhinebeck, New York, as one powers the museum's recently completed Spirit of St. Louis airworthy Ryan NYP reproduction.
- A Wright J-5-CA is on public display at the Aerospace Museum of California

Also on display at the San Francisco International Airport, International Terminal. Older Whirlwinds on display are harder to find. The National Museum of Naval Aviation has two J-4s, one of which is a cutaway. The New England Air Museum in Windsor Locks, Connecticut, has a Lawrance J-1, the Whirlwind's direct predecessor.

== Specifications (R-790 Whirlwind J-5) ==
Data from Type certificate data sheet for the Whirlwind J-5; dimensions from "Model Designations of U.S.A.F. Aircraft Engines"

=== General characteristics ===
- Type: 9-cylinder naturally aspirated air-cooled radial piston engine
- Bore: 4.5 in (114 mm)
- Stroke: 5.5 in (140 mm)
- Displacement: 788 cu in (12.91 L)
- Length: 34 to 40 in (86 to 102 cm)
- Diameter: 45 in (114 cm)
- Dry weight: 520 lb (236 kg)

=== Components ===
- Valvetrain: 2 valves per cylinder, pushrod-actuated
- Fuel system: single three-barrel carburetor
- Fuel type: 50 octane

=== Performance ===
- Power output: 220 hp (164 kW) at 2,000 rpm
- Specific power: 0.279 hp/cu-in (12.7 kW/L)
- Compression ratio: 5.1:1
- Power-to-weight ratio: 0.423 hp/lb (0.696 kW/kg)

== See also ==
- Wright Whirlwind

Related development

- Wright J-6-5/R-540
- Wright J-6-7/R-760
- Wright J-6-9/R-975

Related lists

- List of aircraft engines
