= PZL.48 Lampart =

General information
- Type: Fighter-bomber aircraft
- Manufacturer: Państwowe Zakłady Lotnicze
- Status: Project
- Primary user: Polish Air Force (planned)
- Number built: Incomplete prototype

History
- Developed from: PZL.38 Wilk
- Variants: PZL.54 Ryś

The PZL.48 Lampart (leopard) was a Polish heavy fighter-bomber design, that remained only a project, owing to the outbreak of World War II.

== Design and development ==
The PZL.48 was a development of the heavy fighter-bomber PZL.38 Wilk, designed by Franciszek Misztal. Owing to problems with PZL.38's PZL Foka V8 engines and the excessive weight of the prototype it was decided in 1938 to build a variant of the plane using more powerful radial engines, named PZL.48 Lampart. Despite the new plane appearing almost identical to the PZL.38, apart from the engines, it was, in fact, redesigned in order to decrease weight. French 640 hp Gnome-Rhône 14M engines of small diameter were chosen.

The building of a prototype started in 1939, but by the summer of 1939, only a wing had been made, while the fuselage was still under construction. It was planned to carry out static trials in Autumn 1939 and to fly the prototype in the first half of 1940. Further plans were to produce 110 Lamparts for the Polish Air Force in 1941. Owing to the German invasion on 1 September 1939, all plans were cancelled.

In early 1939 Misztal also worked out the initial design of the PZL.54 Ryś—a development of the PZL.48 with Hispano-Suiza 12L in-line engines.

== Operators (planned) ==
Poland

- Polish Air Force

== Specification ==
It was a twin-engine low-wing cantilever monoplane of metal construction, metal covered. The fuselage was semi-monocoque, elliptic in cross-section. The crew of two—pilot and rear gunner/bombardier/observer—sat under separate canopies, far from each other, fitted with dual controls. The canopy of the pilot's cockpit opened sideways. Three part wing, outer parts built around light closed profiles. Wings fitted with slats and split flaps. Twin vertical stabilizers. Engines in underwing nacelles with NACA covers. Retractable landing gear, with main wheels retracting into engine nacelles, and a rear skid. Three-blade variable-pitch propellers. Integral fuel tanks in wings. Armament (planned): two fixed 20 mm guns and two 7.92 mm PWU wz.36 machine guns in the fuselage nose, twin 7.92 mm PWU wz.37 machine guns of a rear gunner, hiding in the fuselage (Lampart A) or 8 fixed machine guns (Lampart B). It could carry 300-kg of bombs.

== Specifications ==
General characteristics

- Crew: 2, pilot, rear gunner/bombardier
- Capacity: 1,100 kg (2,425.08 lb) useful load
- Length: 8.7 m (28 ft 7 in)
- Wingspan: 11.5 m (37 ft 9 in)
- Height: 2.5 m (8 ft 2 in)
- Wing area: 21.5 m^{2} (231 sq ft)
- Empty weight: 2,400 kg (5,291 lb)
- Gross weight: 3,500 kg (7,716 lb)
- Powerplant: 2 × Gnome-Rhône 14M-07 14-cyl. air-cooled two-row radial engines, 540 kW (730 hp) each

Performance

- Maximum speed: 560 km/h (350 mph, 300 kn)
- Range: 1,500 km (930 mi, 810 nmi)
- Service ceiling: 10,000 m (33,000 ft)
- Rate of climb: 9 m/s (1,800 ft/min)
- Wing loading: 154 kg/m^{2} (32 lb/sq ft)

Armament

- 2 x 20 mm (0.787 in) Nkm wz.38 FK cannon fixed in nose
- 2 x 7.92 mm (0.312 in) PWU wz.36 machine guns fixed in nose
- 2 x 7.92 mm (0.312 in) PWU wz.37 machine guns on a flexible mounting to the rear
- 300 kg (661.39 lb) of bombs

== PZL.54 Ryś ==
PZL.54 Ryś

General information
- Type: Fighter-bomber aircraft
- Manufacturer: Państwowe Zakłady Lotnicze
- Status: Project
- Primary user: Polish Air Force (planned)
- Number built: -

History
- Manufactured: -
- Developed from: PZL.48 Lampart

|} The PZL.54 Ryś (lynx) was a pre-war Polish heavy fighter design developed in 1939 by the PZL company. Although intended as an evolution (and a replacement of) the PZL.48 Lampart, it never went beyond drawing boards due to Invasion of Poland and the outbreak of World War II. The aircraft was to be equipped with more powerful Hispano Suiza 12Z inline engines, and was slated to become one of the basic fighter-bombers of the Polish Army. Heavier than its predecessors due to larger and heavier engine, the PZL.54 was to be faster, feature a higher bombload (with heavier 500 kg bombs mounted under the fuselage) and operational range. While primarily designed as a heavy fighter, thanks to its strong armament the aircraft was to be also suitable as a bomber or fighter-bomber.

The aircraft was to be an all-metal (duraluminium) low-wing monoplane, with a classic retractable landing gear and a fixed tail wheel. The aerodynamic profile was based on the highly successful PZL.37 Łoś bomber, including the double tail fins. The aircraft was to be armed with six 7.9 mm machine guns (3 in each wing), two 20mm cannon (in the nose) and twin 7.9 mm MGs in the rear gunner's station. In addition, the aircraft was to be able to deliver a single 500 kg aerial bomb mounted below the fuselage - or a collection of smaller bombs.

The construction of the first prototype was stopped by the outbreak of the Polish Defensive War. While the design looked promising, the PZL.54 was based around the new Hispano-Suiza engines that at the time were still under development and could deliver only 1000 out of planned 1600 horsepower.

== See also ==
Related development

- PZL.38 Wilk

Aircraft of comparable role, configuration, and era

- Messerschmitt Bf 110
- Potez 630
- Fokker G.I
- Kawasaki Ki-45
- Fw 187
