= PZL WS Foka =

- Type: family of air-cooled V-engines (8-cylinder/12-cylinder)
- National origin: Poland
- Manufacturer: PZL
- Designer: Stanisław Nowkuński, Jan Oderfeld
- First run: 1938
- Number built: 8

PZL WS Foka (Polish: Seal) was a family of Polish air-cooled V-engines of the late 1930s. The Foka A was an 8-cylinder engine initially designed by Stanisław Nowkuński for the modern PZL.38 Wilk heavy fighter and PZL.39 fighter, it was to start a family of high-performance engines for other types of Polish warplanes as well. The initial series was to achieve roughly 450 hp (340 kW) of power and eventually reach 600 horsepower (450 kW).

However, following the designer's death in 1936, the development met a number of serious setbacks. Taken over by a new team of designers, there remained basic problems with vibrations, overheating and high fuel consumption. By the time one of the early prototypes was installed in the second prototype of PZL.38 Wilk, the engine provided only around 330 horsepower (250 kW). As PZL.38 also had other serious issues, both projects were eventually cancelled after only 8 prototypes had been completed.

The successor to Foka A was Foka B, a V-12 engine intended as the powertrain of PZL.48 Lampart, PZL.45 Sokół, RWD-25, PWS-41 and LWS-3 Mewa. However, the outbreak of World War II prevented the first prototype from being completed.

== Design and development ==
In late 1934 the Aeronautics Department of the Polish Ministry of Military Affairs ordered the development of a high-power engine at the Polskie Zakłady Škoda company. The engine was to become the powerplant of PZL.38 and PZL.39 fighters, under development at the time, as well as other modern designs. The lead designer became Stanisław Nowkuński.

Earlier the same year Nowkuński created the GR-760 high-efficiency air-cooled radial engine. Used in a number of sports planes (notably the RWD 9), the engine won the Challenge International de Tourisme 1934 and a number of other tournaments. When tasked with designing a larger, more powerful engine for warplanes, Nowkuński decided to study the Farman 12bis and Ranger V-770 V engines. His new design, the Foka (Polish for seal) drew from both Nowkuński's earlier designs and the promising French and American constructions of the epoch. Similar to Ranger V-770, Foka had only 8 cylinders in an inverted-V configuration and also featured a reduction drive and mechanical supercharger allowing for up to 420 horsepower (310 kW) at 4000 revolutions.

Work on the new engine started in October 1934. The design team included Jerzy Bełkowski, Kazimierz Księski, Jan Oderfeld, Jarosław Naleszkiewicz and Edward Kotarski. In early 1935 the Polskie Zakłady Škoda works were taken over by the state and joined with other state-owned aviation manufacturers to form the Państwowe Zakłady Lotnicze. Hence the new engine received the designation PZL Foka. By early 1936 the basic design was ready. However, on 31 July 1936 Stanisław Nowkuński was killed in an accident while hiking in the Tatra Mountains. Jan Oderfeld took over as head of the design team and two months later the construction of the first prototype series started.

Initially eight engines were manufactured. When one was being worked on at a test bench, additional seven were being modified or prepared for a new series of tests. The first engines were much lighter than had been anticipated: only 210 kilograms (460 lb). However, their initial power output did not exceed 180 horsepower (130 kW). A series of tests and modifications to air inlets allowed for the power output to exceed 350 horsepower (260 kW) in early 1937. However, the modifications also enlarged the engine.

As numerous teething problems plagued the engine and the lead designer died in mountain accident, already in late 1936 Oderfeld informed the ministry that the problems would not be overcome fast enough for the Foka to achieve production readiness soon enough. While the second prototype of PZL.38 Wilk was equipped with prototype PZL WS Foka engines and exhibited at the 1938 Paris Air Show, the engine was far from production readiness. The military insisted on ordering at least 400 engines as soon as possible, while Jerzy Oderfeld insisted that all the problems have to be solved before production starts. Because of that in early 1938 the project was sidetracked and the military decided to seek other engines in France instead (Gnome-Rhône and Hispano-Suiza). Many engineers were directed towards other construction teams and work on PZL Foka slowed down significantly.

It was decided that limited development should continue on PZL Foka to facilitate the design of its successor, the PZL Foka B, a 12-cylinder inverted V engine that was to achieve 700 horsepower (520 kW) at 5000 metres above sea level. Only the most successful elements of Foka A were to be used in the new engine (such as the pistons and valves), while the rest of Foka B was to be designed from scratch or seriously modified. Construction of the first prototype started in early 1939 and it was to be tested in 1940 before reaching production readiness in 1942. It was intended as a replacement of the Gnome-Rhône Mars engine in the role of the powertrain of more modern warplane designs, including PZL.48 Lampart, PZL.45 Sokół, RWD-25, PWS-41 and LWS-3 Mewa. However, the outbreak of World War II in 1939 interrupted the construction.

== Variants ==
Foka A
A 340 kW (450 hp) class V-8 inverted air-cooled piston engine.
Foka B
With similar attributesto the Foka A, the Foka B was a 520 kW (700 hp) class V-12 inverted air-cooled piston engine.

== Applications ==
Foka A
The second prototype PZL.38 Wilk was fitted with pre-production Foka A engines and was also ear-marked for the PZL.39.
Foka B
Intended as the powerplant of the PZL.48 Lampart, PZL.45 Sokół, RWD 25, PWS-41 and LWS-3 Mewa, as a replacement for the Gnome-Rhône 14M Mars.

Aircraft of comparable role, configuration, and era

- Ranger V-770, Daimler-Benz DB 601
- Argus As 410, Walter Sagitta
