= Peszke =

Peszke is a surname. Notable people with the surname include:

- Alfred Bartłomiej Peszke (1899–1966), Polish Air Force officer, father of Michael
- Michael Alfred Peszke (1932–2015), Polish-born American psychiatrist and historian

== See also ==
- Peszek
