= PWS-42 =

Abortive Polish fighter aircraft

General information
- Type: Fighter aircraft
- National origin: Second Polish Republic
- Manufacturer: Podlaska Wytwórnia Samolotów
- Designer: Zygmunt Jabłoński; Kazimierz Nowicki
- Number built: 1 mock-up under construction (1939)

The PWS-42 was a Polish project for a single-seat fighter aircraft in a low-wing monoplane designed in the late 1930s by engineers Zygmunt Jabłoński and Kazimierz Nowicki. In 1939, a mock-up of the aircraft was under construction at the Podlaska Wytwórnia Samolotów in Biała Podlaska, but the outbreak of World War II halted progress. The prototype was planned to be ready for flight testing by the summer of 1940.

== History ==
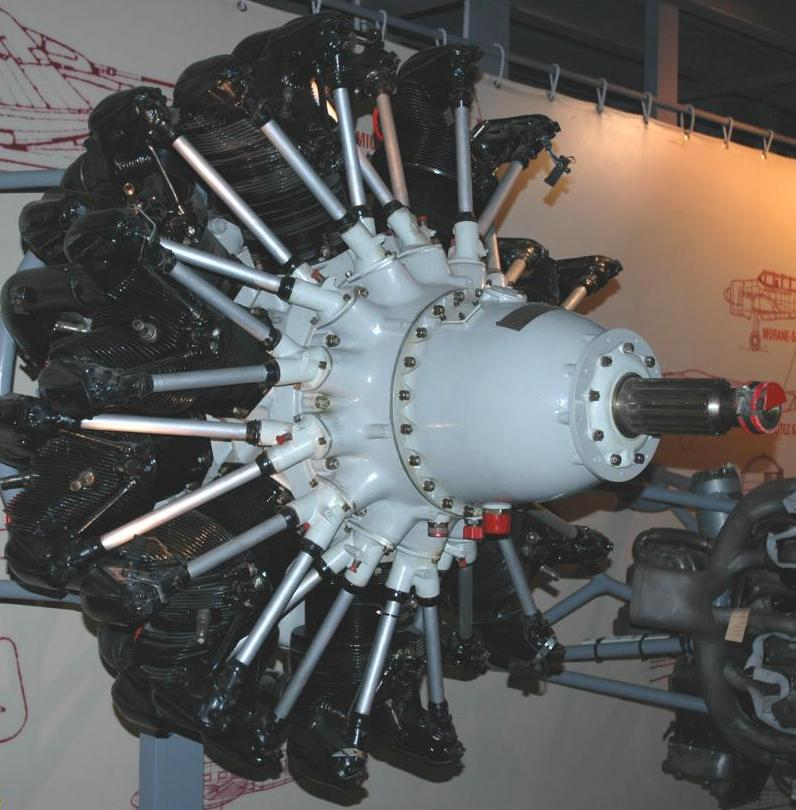
Gnome-Rhône 14M7 Mars engine intended to power the PWS-42

In the spring of 1939, the Aviation Command of the Ministry of Military Affairs commissioned three Polish aircraft manufacturers to design a "light fighter aircraft". Based on their expertise and technological capabilities, Państwowe Zakłady Lotnicze in Warsaw was tasked with developing a metal-construction fighter (PZL.45 Sokół), Doświadczalne Warsztaty Lotnicze were assigned a mixed-construction fighter (RWD-25), and Podlaska Wytwórnia Samolotów was to create a wooden-construction pursuit aircraft. All three designs were to be powered by the French radial engine Gnome-Rhône 14M Mars. After flight testing the prototypes at the Aviation Technical Institute, the Aviation Command planned to select the best design for equipping squadrons.

In April 1939, engineers Zygmunt Jabłoński and Kazimierz Nowicki began work on the fighter, designated PWS-42. The aircraft was designed as a fully wooden cantilever low-wing monoplane with a closed cockpit and retractable landing gear. The fabric covering of the fuselage was planned to be made from laminated plywood sourced from the Konopacki brothers' plywood factory in Masty. The designers also explored a mixed-construction variant with a truss fuselage welded from steel tubes and considered fixed landing gear as a fallback if reliable retraction mechanisms were unavailable.

By the outbreak of World War II, the PWS-42 design was still in development, with drawings for the wing and engine mount completed, and a mock-up was under construction. The prototype airframe was scheduled for completion by summer 1940. Russian archives in Moscow contain calculations captured in 1939 for a fighter designated PWS-46, which may refer to the same project or an improved model.

== Design and technical data ==
The PWS-42 was designed as a single-engine, single-seat low-wing fighter with wooden or mixed construction. The semi-monocoque fuselage was to be covered with plywood featuring double curvature, laminated with aluminium foil. The pilot's cockpit was fully enclosed.

The wing was trapezoidal, dual-spar, three-section, and wooden, also covered with aluminium-laminated plywood, equipped with flaps; its wingspan was approximately 9 meters. The wing area was about 16 m^{2}, with a wing loading of 120 kg/m^{2}.

The aircraft's length was approximately 7.1 meters, and its height was about 2.4 meters. The empty weight was around 1,450 kg, the useful load was 450 kg, and the total (takeoff) weight was 1,900 kg. The flight control surfaces were a conventional wooden structure. The landing gear was a two-wheel, single-strut, retractable design with hydropneumatic shock absorption by Avia.

The aircraft was to be powered by an air-cooled, 14-cylinder, double-row radial Gnome-Rhône 14M7 Mars engine, delivering a maximum power of 537 kW (730 hp) at 3,135 rpm at 3,500 meters, a nominal power of 485 kW (660 hp) at 3,650 meters, a takeoff power of 471 kW (640 hp), and weighing 450 kg. It was equipped with a reduction drive and a compressor. The power-to-weight ratio was 2.9 kg/hp. The engine featured a NACA cowling with adjustable flaps. The maximum speed was projected at 520 km/h, the cruising speed at 380 km/h, and the stall speed at 100 km/h. The aircraft was expected to reach a service ceiling of about 8,000 meters with a rate of climb of approximately 9 m/s. The range was estimated at 750 km.

The aircraft was to be armed with four PWU wz. 36 7.92 mm machine guns: two synchronized in the fuselage and two in the wings.

== Bibliography ==
- Chwałczyk, Tadeusz; Glass, Andrzej (1990). Samoloty PWS [PWS Aircraft] (in Polish). Warsaw: Wydawnictwa Komunikacji i Łączności. ISBN 83-206-0899-6.
- Morgała, Andrzej (1972). Polskie samoloty wojskowe 1918-1939 [Polish Military Aircraft 1918-1939] (in Polish). Warsaw: Wydawnictwo Ministerstwa Obrony Narodowej.
