= PZL.49 Miś =

Polish medium bomber project

- Possibly a side drawing from one of the few surviving pieces of documentation on this design.

General information
- Type: Bomber
- Manufacturer: Państwowe Zakłady Lotnicze
- Primary user: Polish Air Force (planned)
- Number built: Incomplete prototype

The PZL.49 Miś (English: Little Bear) was a Polish twin-engined medium bomber design that remained only a project due to the outbreak of World War II. The PZL.49 was based on the contemporary PZL.37 Łoś and was to replace it at production lines at Państwowe Zakłady Lotnicze.

== Design ==
The PZL.49 was a development of the advanced, "state-of-the-art" medium bomber PZL.37 Łoś, designed by Jerzy Dąbrowski, Stanisław Kot and Piotr Kubicki. About 50% of its design elements were taken from PZL.37 Łoś bomber to simplify the design process. The main target for the design team was to increase performance, especially flight speed, by means of installing more powerful engines and improving aerodynamics. Its standard 2,200 kg (4,900 lb) bomb load could be increased to 3,000 kg (6,600 lb) by decreasing its fuel load. Its standard 2,200 km (1,200 nmi) range could be increased to 3,000 km (1,900 nmi) with additional fuel tanks.

Detailed project was ready in mid-1938 and a report by General Józef Zając from 28 November 1938 stated that all drawings were complete. Design process was slow due to the simultaneous involvement of PZL construction bureau in development of the PZL.50 Jastrząb fighter. During the summer of 1939, a mock-up of the PZL.49 was approved by the Air Force and project could be continued. Due to the engagement of Jerzy Dąbrowski in PZL.62 development, Piotr Kubicki became the leader of the PZL.49 design team.

In late 1938 or early 1939 production of parts for two prototypes begun in Wytwórnia Płatowców nr 1 of PZL factory (PZL WP-2). In early 1939 a full-scale mock-up of fuselage with part of the left wing was built for testing placement of cockpit and fuselage equipment.

Serial production was planned to take place in the PZL WP-2 factory in Mielec as well as construction bureau HQ. A development schedule from August 1939 set the first flight of PZL.49/I in the summer of 1940, with the first serial built aircraft being delivered to combat units in late 1941 or early 1942. However, due to the German invasion on 1 September 1939, all plans were canceled. All documentation of the PZL.49 project was moved to Jerzy Dąbrowski's apartment in Warsaw early September 1939 and in late September, during siege of Warsaw, was burned in a nearby bakery to avoid German capture. Very little of the documentation has been recovered since the war.

== Technical design ==
The aircraft was conventional in layout, all metal (including the skin), with low-set laminar-flow wings and a twin tail. In terms of size, it was slightly larger than the Lockheed Model 10 Electra that Amelia Earhart used and was comparable to its predecessor, the PZL.37 Łoś. The crew consisted of four: pilot, commander/bombardier, radio operator and a rear gunner. The bombardier was accommodated in the glazed nose, with two forward-firing 7.92 mm PWU wz.37 machine guns. The radio operator sat inside the fuselage, above the bomb bay. The radio operator also operated two rear-firing 7.92 mm PWU wz.37 machine guns fitted in a kołyska (Polish: bassinet, typically called a gondola in English). The rear gunner sat in a fuselage turret with a 20mm cannon or four 7.92 mm PWU wz.37 machine guns.

The main undercarriage retracted into the engine nacelles. The undercarriage was double-wheeled, with an independent suspension for each wheel and retractable rear wheel. The plane was powered by two Bristol Hercules radial engines with NACA covers. The bombs were carried in a two-section bomb bay in the fuselage, as well as bomb bays in the central section of the wings. The maximum load was 3,000 kg. Wings were fitted with split flaps.

== Variants (planned) ==
PZL.49/I
First prototype for flight and static trials.
PZL.49/II
Second prototype, pattern aircraft for PZL.49A version.
PZL.49A
Version powered by PZL-Bristol Hercules III engines.
PZL.49B
Export version with French Gnome-Rhône 14N-50/51 engines.

== Operators (planned) ==
Poland

- Polish Air Force
  - Brygada Bombowa

== Specification (PZL.49 estimated) ==
Data from Samoloty : PZL-49 "Bear"

General characteristics

- Crew: 4
- Length: 14.5 m (47 ft 7 in)
- Wingspan: 18 m (59 ft 1 in)
- Height: 4.8 m (15 ft 9 in)
- Wing area: 55 m^{2} (590 sq ft)
- Empty weight: 6,500 kg (14,330 lb)
- Max takeoff weight: 11,500 kg (25,353 lb)
- Powerplant: 2 × PZL-Bristol Hercules III 14-cylinder air-cooled sleeve-valve radial piston engines, 1,005 kW (1,348 hp) each to 1,050 kW (1,410 hp) for take-off, 829–862 kW (1,112–1,156 hp) nominal rating
- Propellers: 3-bladed de Havilland or PZL-Hamilton-Standard adjustable / variable pitch propellers

Performance

- Maximum speed: 520 km/h (320 mph, 280 kn)
- Range: 2,000 km (1,200 mi, 1,100 nmi)
- Ferry range: 3,000 km (1,900 mi, 1,600 nmi)
- Wing loading: 209.9 kg/m^{2} (43.0 lb/sq ft)
- Power/mass: 0.1825 kW/kg (0.1110 hp/lb)

Armament

- Guns:
- 2 × 7.92 mm (0.312 in) PWU wz.37 machine guns in nose
- 2 × 7.92 mm (0.312 in) PWU wz.37 machine guns mounted in ventral position
- 1 × 20 mm (0.787 in) Oerlikon FF S or FK wz.38D cannon, or 4 × 7.92 mm (0.312 in) PWU wz.37 machine guns in dorsal turret
- Bombs: 3,000 kg (6,600 lb) of bombs

== See also ==
Related development

- PZL.37 Łoś

Aircraft of comparable role, configuration, and era

- Amiot 354
- Dornier Do 217
- Ilyushin Il-4
- Lioré et Olivier LeO 45
- Nakajima Ki-49
