= RWD-25 =

- Model of proposed RWD-25

General information
- Type: Monoplane fighter
- National origin: Poland
- Manufacturer: DWL
- Designer: RWD
- Status: Abandoned
- Number built: None

The RWD-25 was a proposed Polish low-wing light fighter aircraft of 1939 designed by RWD. The project was abandoned when Poland was invaded.

== Design and development ==
In late 1930s the Polish Army sought several replacements for the rapidly aging PZL P.11c, the backbone of Polish aviation of the epoch. One of the specifications issued by the new commander of Polish aviation General Józef Zając in the spring of 1939 was for a Jockey-class plane, a light, inexpensive and easy to produce interceptor. The plane was to use a cheaper, less powerful radial engine than more advanced multi-purpose fighters. The Jockeys were to be used in accordance with the French concept of "chimney flights", that is for aerial defence of valuable factories and other military targets behind friendly lines. For that purpose they needed less speed, but more manoeuvrability and a faster rate of climb. The plane was to rise quickly after the alarm is sounded and attack formations of enemy bombers in a dive, thus enhancing its speed. One of such fighters designed and produced in France was the Caudron C.710.

Three Polish aircraft design studios produced designs to that specification. All were to be powered by the 800 hp (597 kW) Gnome-Rhône Mars radial engine. The Podlaska Wytwórnia Samolotów created the PWS-42, the Państwowe Zakłady Lotnicze created the PZL.45 Sokół. The last to propose a new design was the RWD, with its RWD-25 by Jerzy Drzewiecki and Tadeusz Chyliński, Henryk Millicer, Jan Idzikowski.

The RWD-25 was proposed as a single-seat cantilever low-wing monoplane fighter powered by an 800 hp (597 kW) Gnome-Rhône Mars 14M05 radial engine. It was to be armed with four wing-mounted KMO wz.37 "Szczeniak" machine-guns. The construction was to be mixed for cheaper and faster production: steel fuselage frame covered with linen and plywood. The wings were to be made entirely of wood. For lighter weight and cheaper production, the design included a fixed landing gear, though it is probable that the eventual series would have a retractable landing gear. Although the RWD received orders for a prototype and a full-scale mock-up for further tests, the outbreak of World War II interrupted the development and no planes were ever built.
