= Lubaczów =

Town in Subcarpathian Voivodeship, Poland

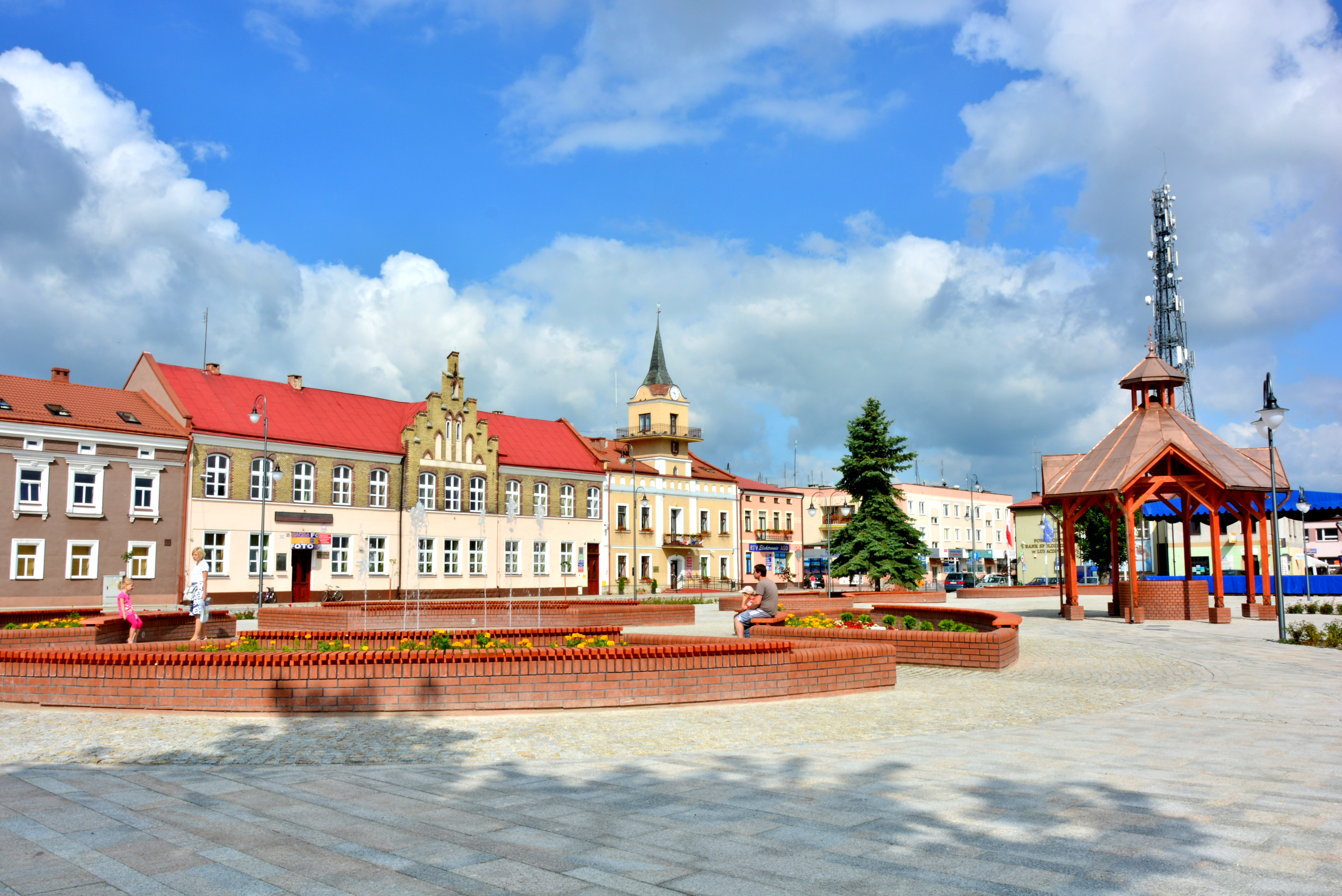
- Market square

- Coat of arms

- Location within Poland
- Coordinates: 50°10′N 23°7′E
- Country: Poland
- Voivodeship: Subcarpathian
- County: Lubaczów
- Gmina: Lubaczów (urban gmina)
- First mentioned: 1214
- Town rights: 1376

Government
  - Mayor: Krzysztof Szpyt

Area
  - Total: 26 km^{2} (10 sq mi)

Population (2013)
  - Total: 12,517
  - Density: 480/km^{2} (1,200/sq mi)
- Time zone: UTC+1 (CET)
  - Summer (DST): UTC+2 (CEST)
- Postal code: 37–600
- Car plates: RLU
- Website: http://www.lubaczow.pl

Lubaczów (Note: Polish: [luˈbat͡ʂuf]; Yiddish: ליבעטשויוו Libatchov; Ukrainian: Любачів Liubachiv) is a town in southeastern Poland, close to the border with Ukraine, with 12,567 inhabitants Situated in the Subcarpathian Voivodeship, it is the capital of Lubaczów County and is located 50 kilometres (31 miles) northeast of Przemyśl.

== Names ==
Other historic forms and spellings of the town's name include Lubacew, Ljubacew, Lubachow, Lubatchow, Libatchov, Libechuyv, Liubachev, Lubachov, Lubatchov, and Lubichuv.

== History ==
Lubaczów was first mentioned in written documents in 1214, when, following the Spiš Treaty between Duke Leszek I the White and King Andrew II of Hungary, the gord was placed under the authority of Voivode of Sandomierz, Pakosław Lasocic. Until 1376, Lubaczów was spelled Lubacew or Ljubacew. Upon receiving its town charter in 1376, the spelling of the name was changed to Lubaczów. Until 1462, Lubaczów was governed by the Dukes of Mazovia, as a Polish fief. In that year, it was directly annexed into the Kingdom of Poland, as part of the newly created Bełz Voivodeship in the Lesser Poland Province, in which it remained until 1772. During the Polish–Ottoman War (1672–76), the Battle of Niemirow took place near Lubaczów (October 7–8, 1672).

From 1772 to 1918, Lubaczów belonged to the Austrian Galicia, as the town was annexed by the Habsburg Empire after the First Partition of Poland. In 1868, the Austrian authorities moved the seat of the county to nearby Cieszanów, while in 1880, Lubaczów received a rail connection with Jarosław. In 1896, a hospital was built, but three years later, most of the town burned down in a large fire.

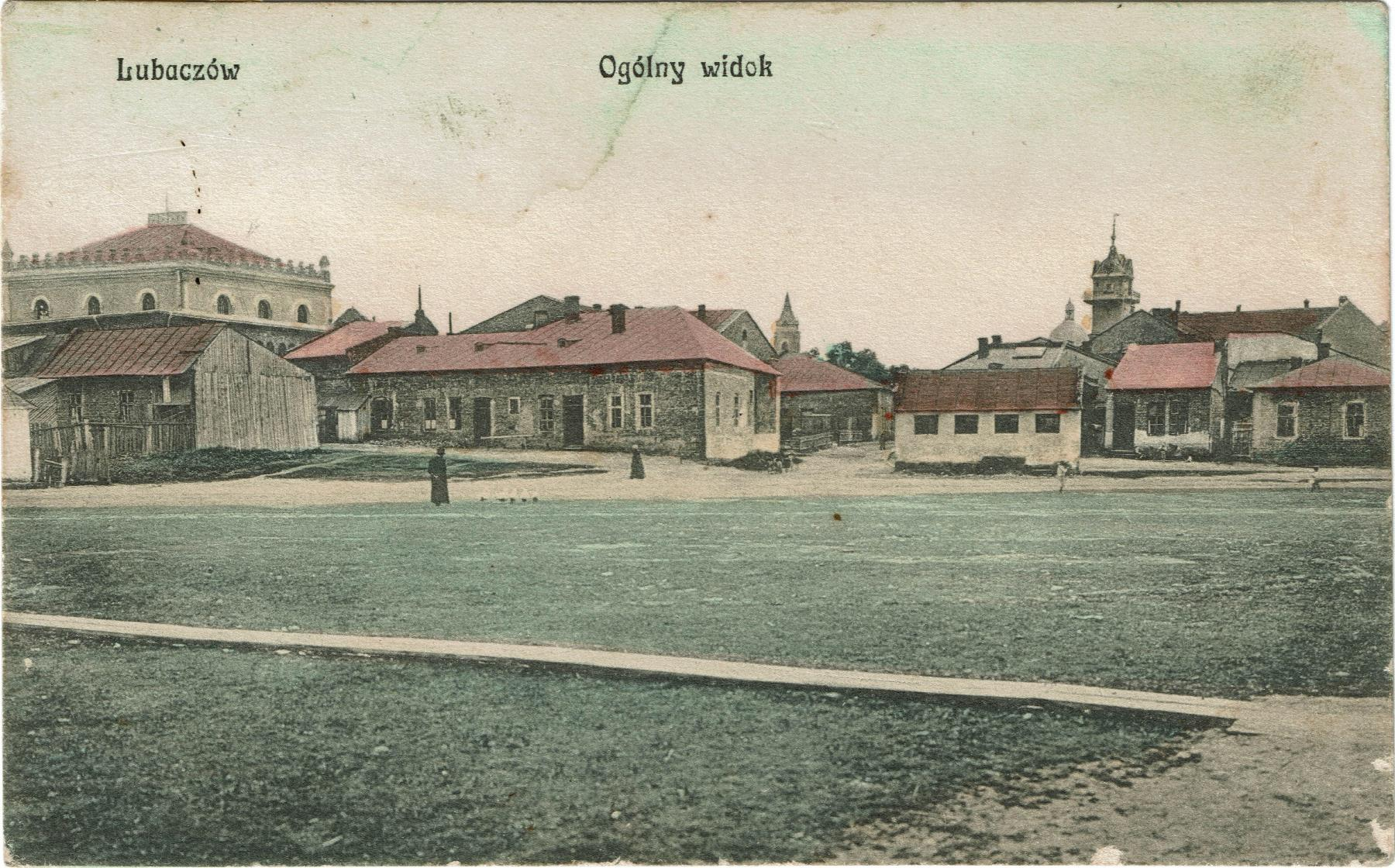
Lubaczów in 1912

In 1918, Poland was declared an independent state: Lubaczów became part of the Second Polish Republic’s Lwów Voivodeship. The Lubaczów Company of the Polish Army took part in the Polish–Ukrainian War (1918–1919). In mid-September 1939, during the German Invasion of Poland, heavy fighting between the advancing Wehrmacht and retreating Polish 21st Mountain Infantry Division commanded by General Jozef Kustron. On September 16, the Battle of Oleszyce took place near Lubaczów, in which General Kustron was killed.

On September 7, 1939, Lubaczów was bombed by the Luftwaffe, and five days later, the town was occupied by the German forces. On September 26, however, the Soviet Red Army seized Lubaczów (see Molotov–Ribbentrop Pact). The town remained under Soviet occupation until June 22, 1941, while German occupation lasted until July 1944, when Lubaczów was recaptured by the Soviets.

After World War II, Lubaczów was one of the few locations of the Roman Catholic Archdiocese of Lwów to remain within Poland, when the national boundaries were redrawn in 1945. As a result, the former parish church in Lubaczów was named a cathedral, and the part of the Lwów Archiodiocese, which remained in Poland, was named the Lubaczów Archdiocese, as the Communist government banned all traces of Polish presence in the city of Lwów. In 1984, an inventory of the parish records from the archdiocese of the church archive established there was drawn up. In 1992, the position of the Lubaczów area within the Polish diocesan structure was regularized, and it became part of the Diocese of Zamość-Lubaczów. There was still a church archive in Lubaczów. In 1999, Lubaczów became part of the Subcarpathian Voivodeship.

Following World War II and the change of borders, several relics from Eastern Borderlands were transported to Lubaczów. Among them was the miraculous picture of Our Lady of Bełz, relics of Blessed Jakub Strzemie, and the urn with the heart of Archbishop Jozef Bilczewski. Furthermore, from 1946 to 1980, the miraculous painting of Our Blessed Lady of the Latin Cathedral was kept at Lubaczów. It was brought here by Archbishop Eugeniusz Baziak.

=== Jewish history ===
- 1498: The Jews of Lubaczów are mentioned for the first time, when they were granted a lease to collect Lubaczów customs duties that year.
- 1532: The Polish King forbade the Jews of Lubaczów from doing any business with the population in the surrounding villages.
- 1538: Tax records show that eighteen Jewish families were living in Lubaczów who paid taxes to the King.
- 1565: The lustration of this year mentions only three Jewish families living in the town.
- 1621, 1633 & 1639: Lubaczów Jews were involved in trade and crafts, and also had the right to brew beer. They still held the lease for the collection of municipal fees, as well as the royal taxes from the entire starostwo (local administrative unit) in these years.
- 1648–1649: The Cossacks and Ruthenian farmers led by Bohdan Chmielnicki opposed the Polish government. In their eyes, the Jews were agents of the Polish rulers, and with barbaric methods, they attacked the Jews. In Lubaczów, the shops at the Rynek (town square) and in the surrounding streets were completely burnt down.
- 1662: The lustration of that year does not mention any Jewish households, though by the early eighteenth century, a relatively large community did exist there, as evidenced by the amount of taxes paid to the royal treasury.
- 1670: There were only five Jewish families in Lubaczów.
- 1765: According to the census of that year, there were 687 Jews obliged to pay taxes who were living in the town and surrounding villages.
- 1787: Around thirty Jewish families in Lubaczów asked the Austrian government to give them land so that they could be farmers, but there was no response to their plea.
- 19th century: The Jewish community in Lubaczów grew stronger, and the Jews worked as traders in agricultural products and peddlers in the nearby villages.
- 1880: The eastern and western railway lines in Poland were connected after a new railway was built from Jarosław, and Lubaczów became important after getting its own railway station. That year, the Jewish Community was about 1,300 people (approximately 30% of the total population).
- 1891: A Business directory for Galicia is published, containing about 25000 names of people in the professions. It includes several people from Lubaczów.
- 1899: There was a big fire in Lubaczów in 1899, and the town was largely damaged. Among those who lost their homes were 220 Jewish families comprising almost 1,000 people.
- 1906: The Address Directory for Galicia was published. It had 550 pages.
- 1914–1918: During World War I, around 500 Jews left Lubaczów, and many did not come back till the middle of the twenties.
- 1931: According to most sources, there were 6,291 citizens in the town, out of whom 1,794 were Jews (Jews were the second largest group in the town after Poles).
- 1933: The Jewish Cemetery in Lubaczów was closed by the Polish authorities, and was reopened only after a long public struggle.

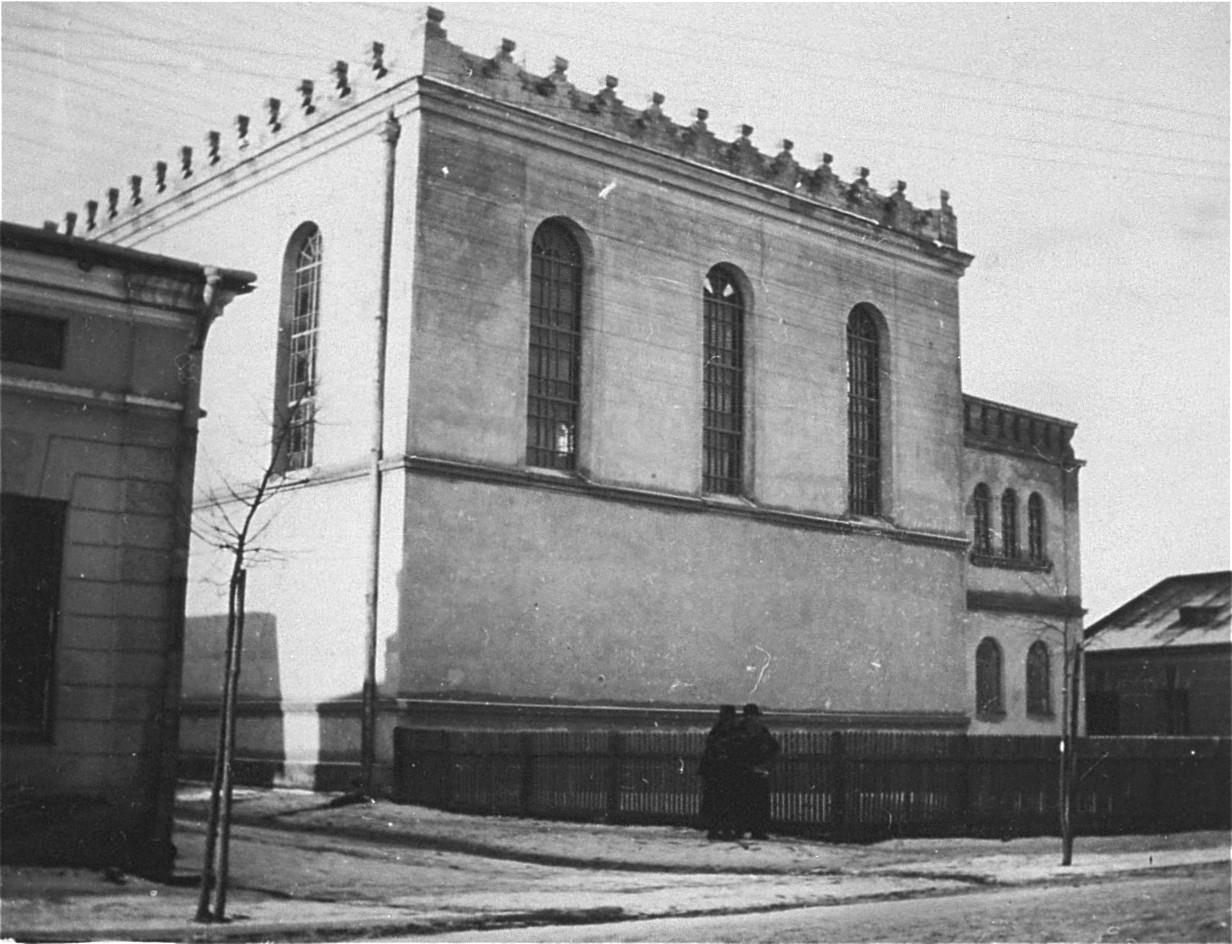
Synagogue in 1938

- 1939: According to "Where Once We Walked" there were 1,715 Jews in Lubaczów before the Holocaust. According to other sources, there were 2,300.
- September 1 and September 17, 1939: Germany and the Soviet Union invade Poland. Lubaczow is occupied by the Soviet Union, until June 1941,
- April 1942: There were 2270 Jews in Lubaczów.
- May 1942: 2000 Jews were brought by the Germans to Lubaczów from the surrounding villages.
- October 1942: The Nazis gave the order that a Jewish ghetto should be established in Lubaczów. Within 48 hours, the Jews were overcrowded within the ghetto. Shortly after that, the first transport of Jews was sent from Lubaczów to Belzec. Jews from Niemirów and Potilitz were brought to Lubaczów. At its peak, the ghetto became home to 7,000 Jews, who were kept in apartments located in the center of the town. About 5–6 families lived in each apartment.
- November 1942: Most of the Jews from Oleszyce, about 2,000, were brought to Lubaczów.
- December 1942: The Germans promised there would be no further killing of Jews in Lubaczów because most of those who were still there were working for the Germans as slave laborers. The Nazis had already shipped 2500 Jews to the extermination camp at Belzec.
- January 5, 1943: There was a great snowstorm that brought great cold. The Germans collected all finished and unfinished items from the Jewish tailors and shoemakers. A rumor spread that the Germans would kill all the Jews. Whoever had the possibility fled that night from the ghetto.
- January 6, 1943: Around 8 a.m., the final mass execution of the Jews in Lubaczów started. The Germans and their Ukrainian auxiliaries murdered hundreds. The killings continued until January 14. Some were killed when found in their underground secret bunkers. Others were brought to the Jewish cemetery where an estimated 1200 Jews were killed and buried in a mass grave. Some were sent to Belzec extermination camp. The very few Jews who survived did so by fleeing into the forests and by joining the partisans. Only around 20 Lubaczów Jews survived the war.
- July 21, 1944: The Germans finally withdrew, and the Soviet Red Army re-occupied Lubaczów. Poland became a communist country aligned with the Soviet Union.

== Sights ==
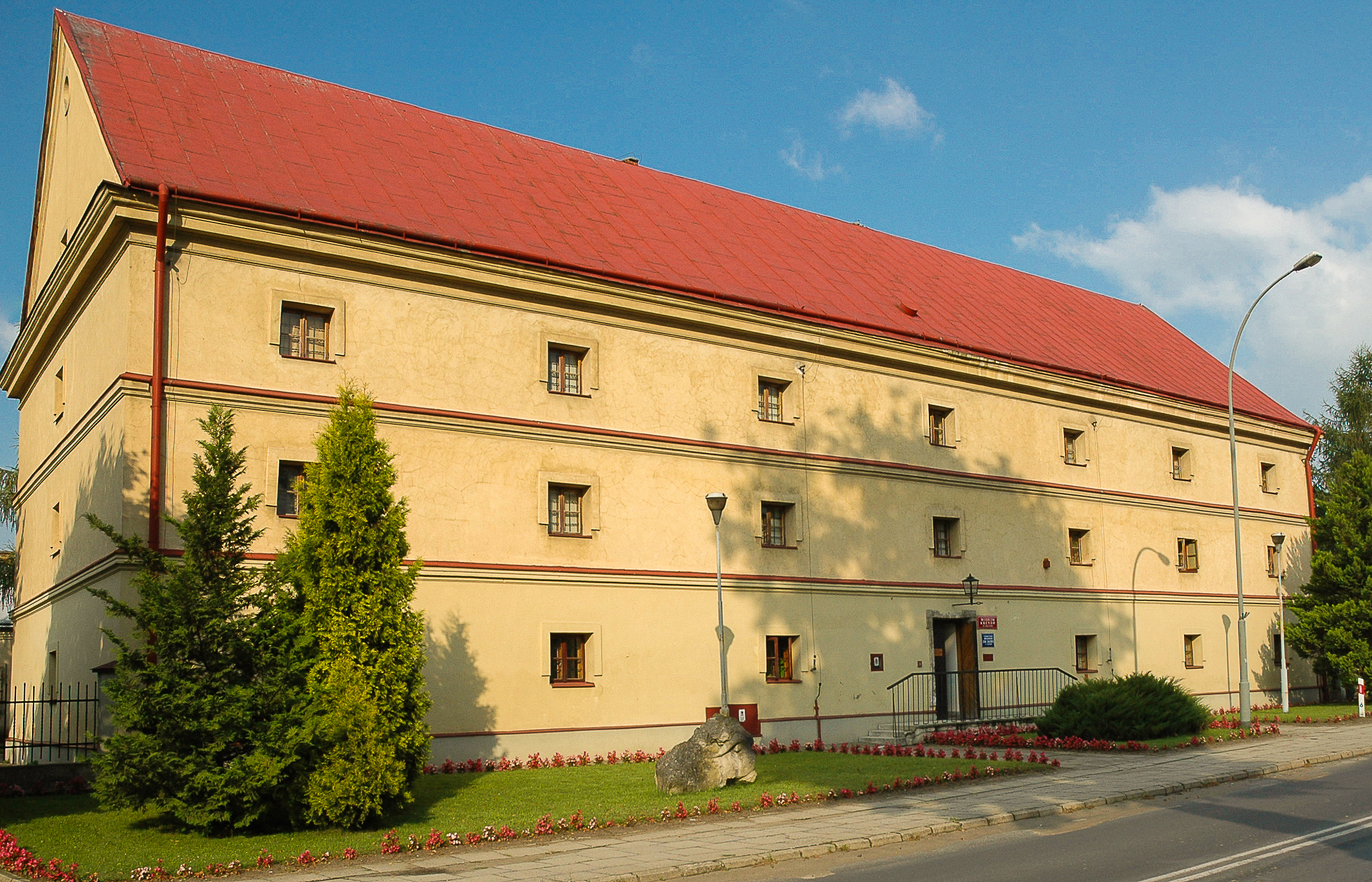
Kresy Museum

- Kresy Museum (Polish: Muzeum Kresów)
- St. Nicolaus Orthodox church,
- Historical town hall
- Rail station (1880), with a water tower,
- Jewish cemetery
- Roman Catholic cemetery (19th century)
- Castle hill with remains of a fortress, granary and park

== Notable people ==
- Aleksander Bandrowski (1860–1913), singer
- Stanisław Dąbek (1892–1939), Colonel of the Polish Army, who in September 1939 commanded defence of the Polish Coast
- Stanisław Dębicki (1866–1924), painter
- Dana Demkiv (b. 1932), Ukrainian ballet master and ethnographer
- Robert Korzeniowski (b. 1968), racewalker, Olympic golden medallist
- Franciszek Misztal (1901–1981), engineer, co-creator of such planes, as PZL.23 Karas and PZL.38 Wilk
- Józefina Szałańska (b. 1951), actress
- Władysław Witwicki (1878–1948), psychologist, philosopher, translator and artist

== Gallery ==
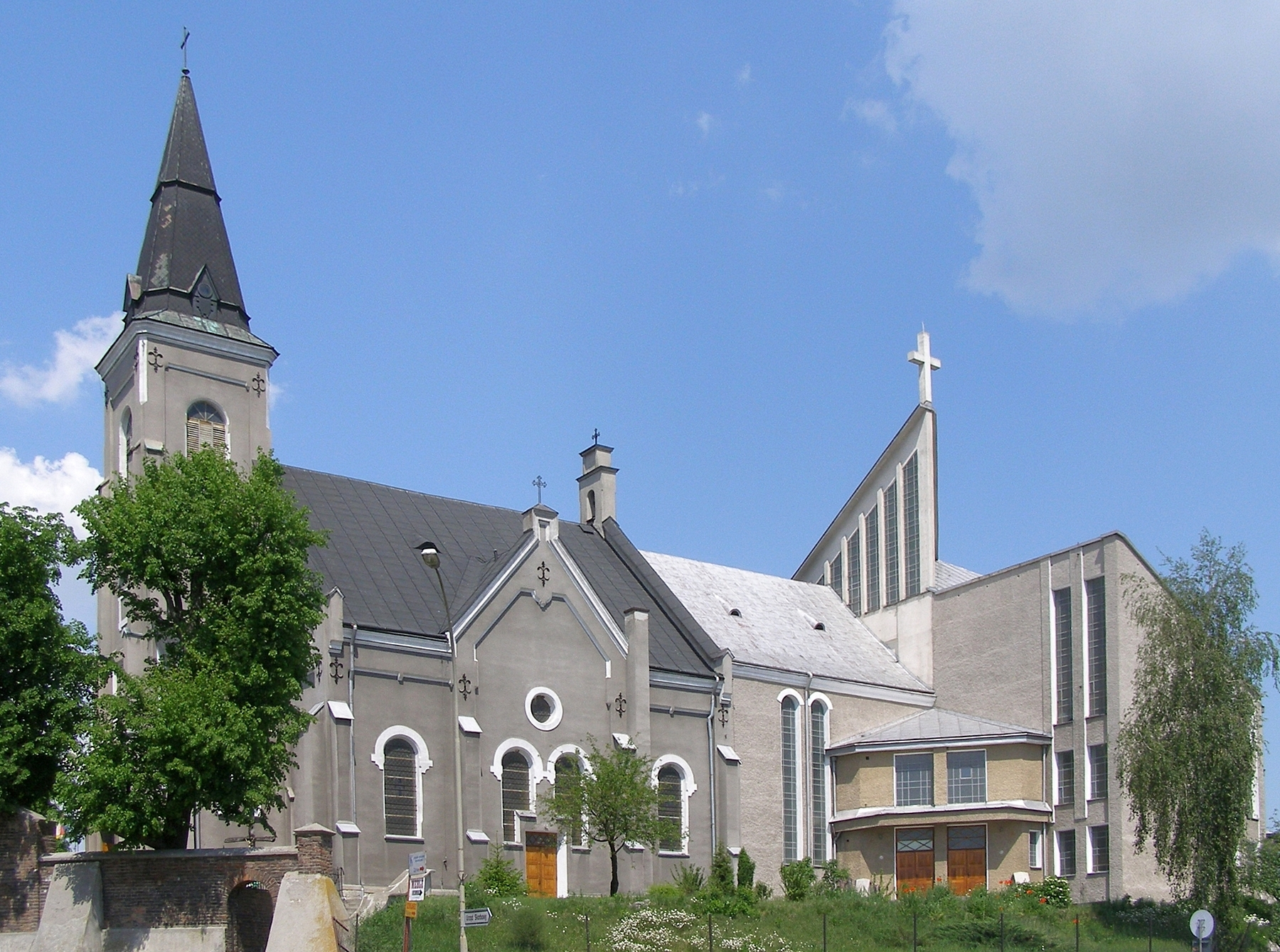
St. Stanislaw Church

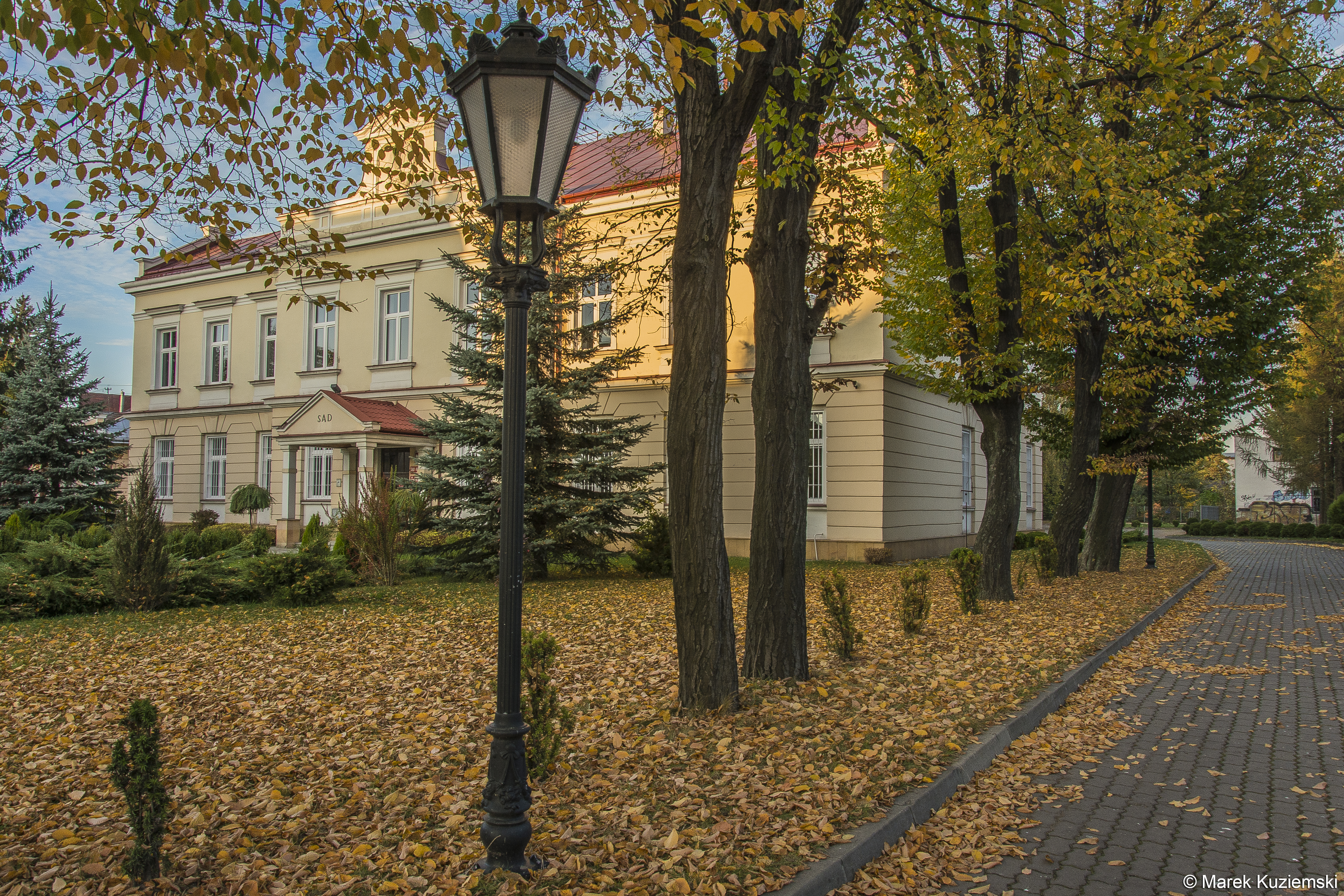
District Court in Lubaczów

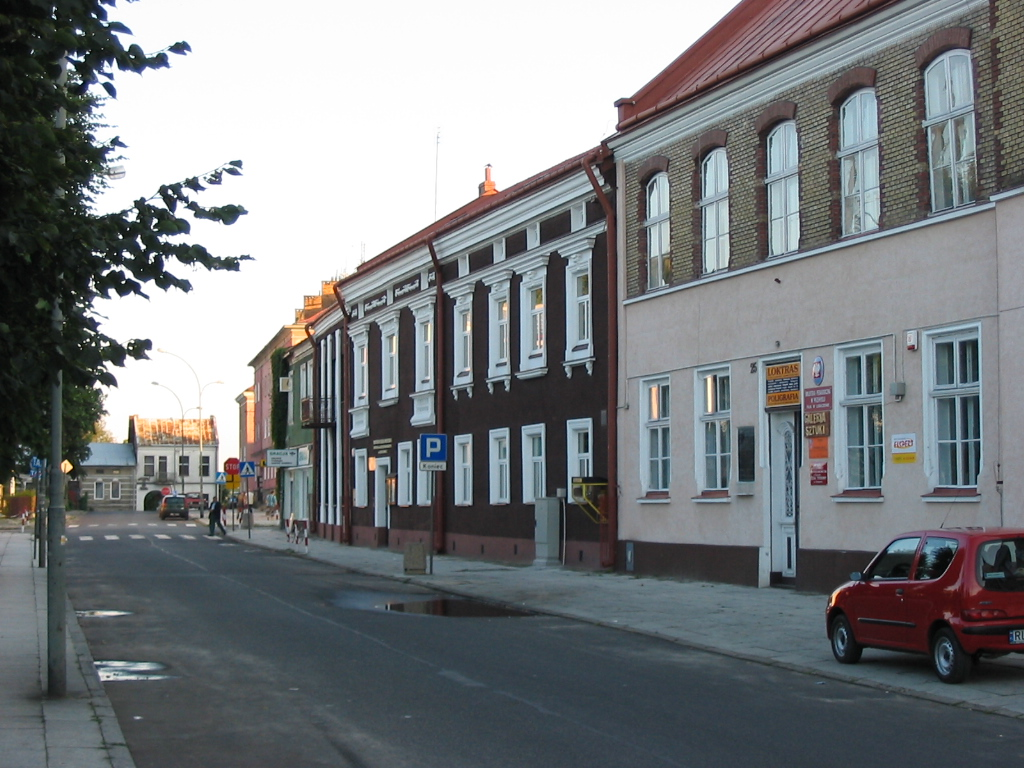
Lubaczów Music School

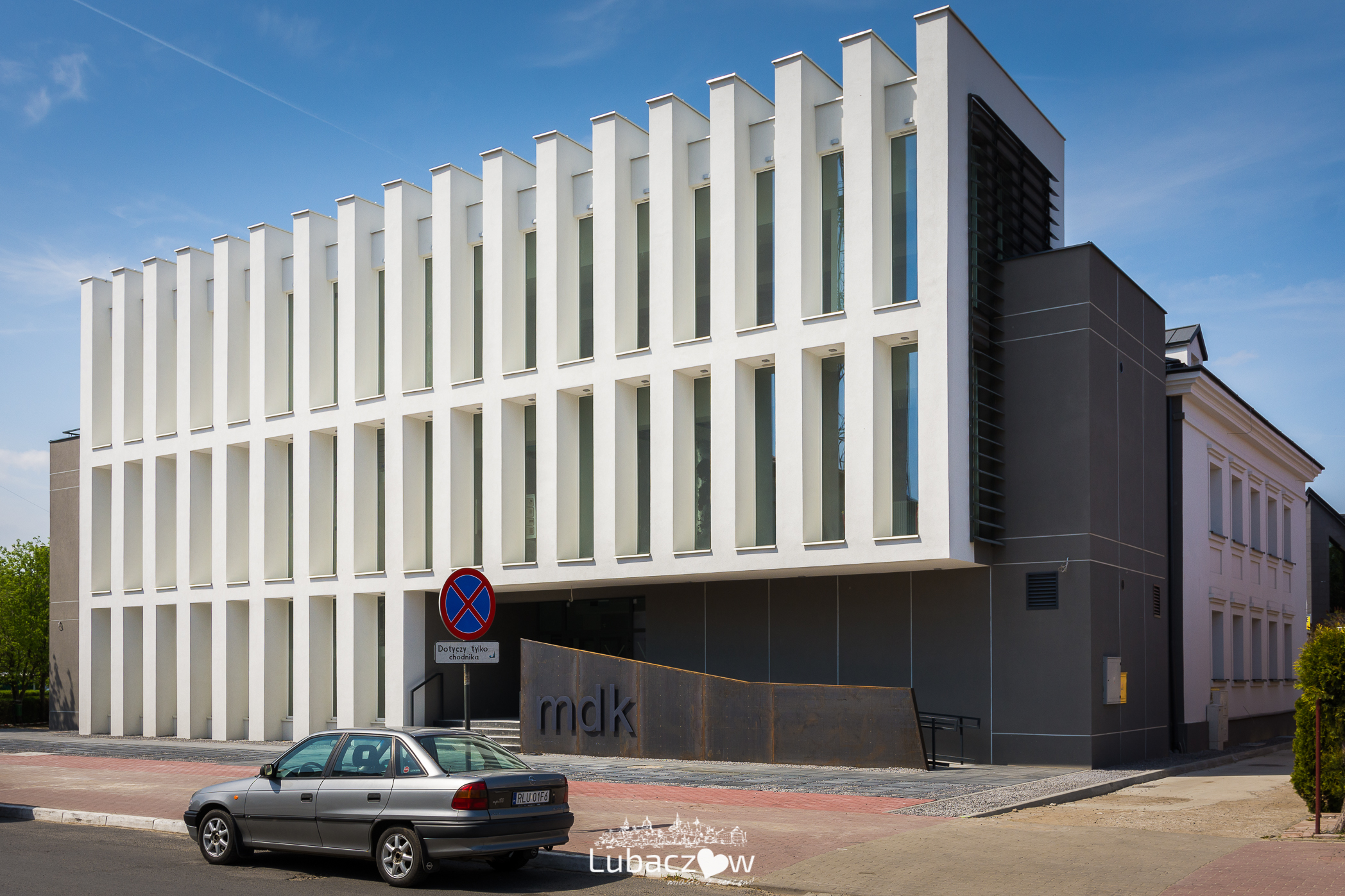
Municipal House of Culture

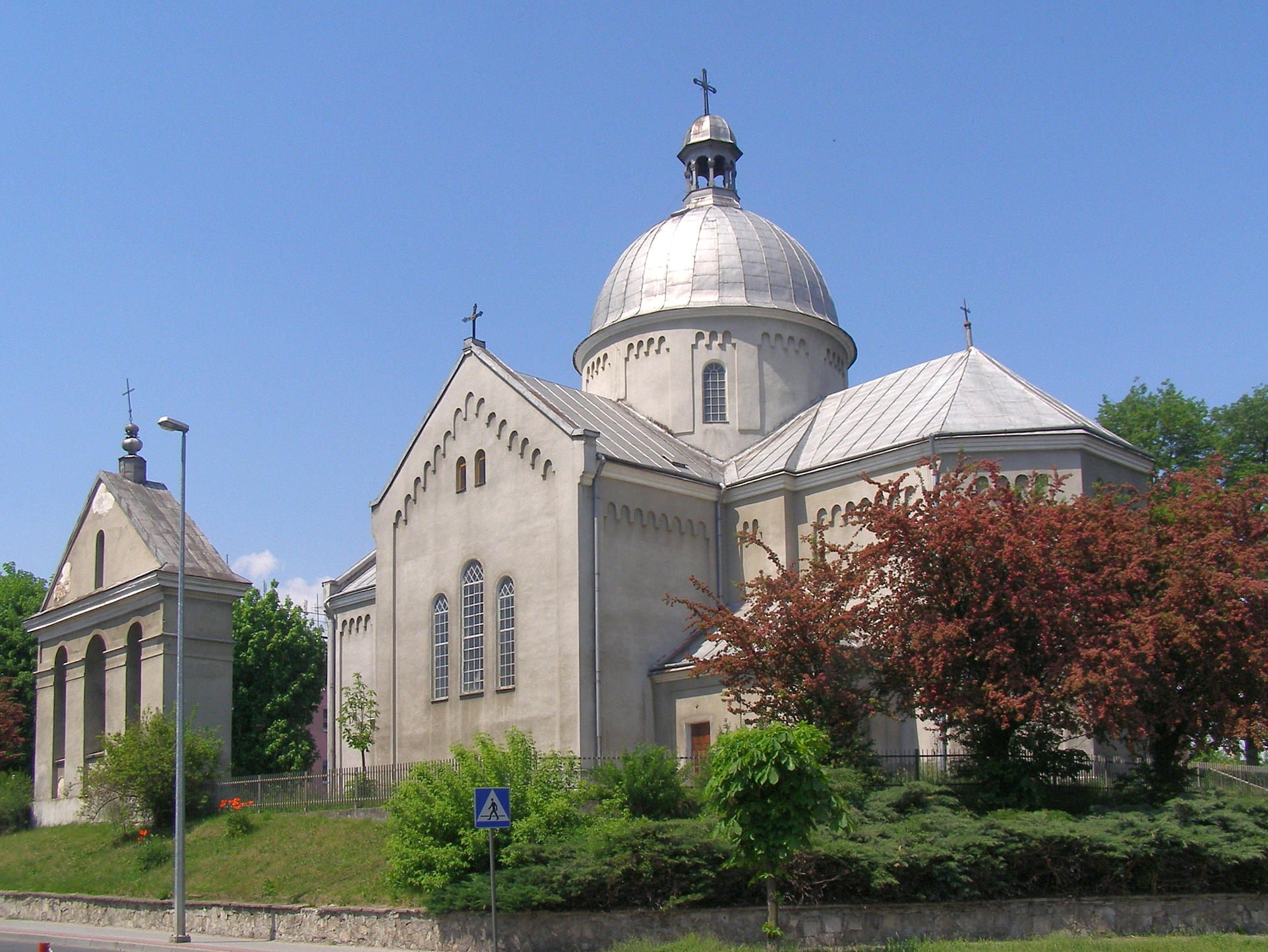
Greek Catholic Church of St. Nicholas

== International relations ==
=== Twin towns – Sister cities ===
Lubaczów is twinned with:

City	Country	Year
Tostedt	Germany	1993
Yavoriv	Ukraine	1997
Érd	Hungary	2003
Sobrance	Slovakia	2009
Reghin	Romania	2014
