= PZL.38 Wilk =

Polish heavy fighter aircraft

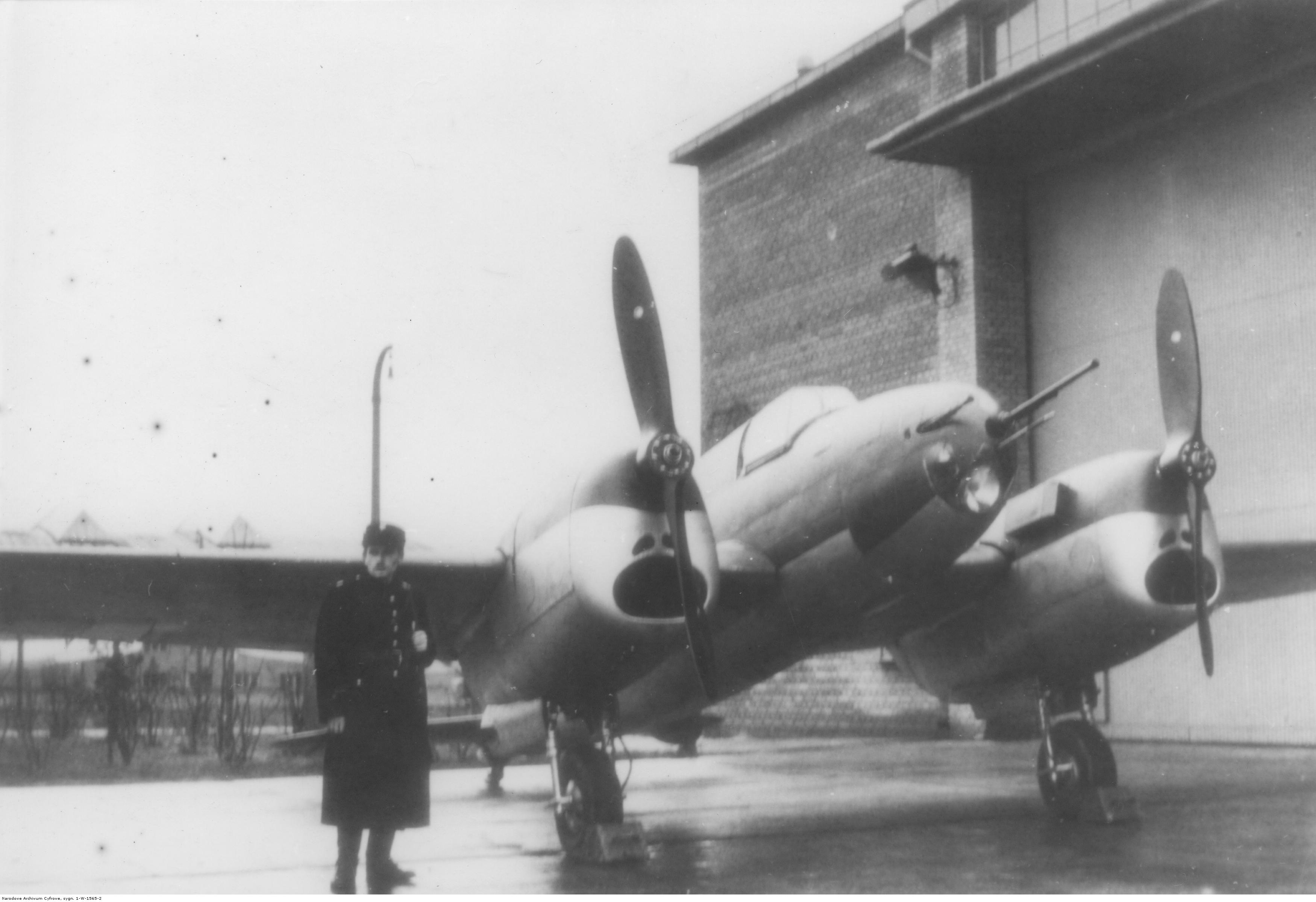
- PZL.38

General information
- Type: Heavy fighter
- Manufacturer: Państwowe Zakłady Lotnicze
- Number built: 2

History
- First flight: 1938
- Variant: PZL.48 Lampart

The PZL.38 Wilk (wolf) was a Polish heavy fighter developed and manufactured by PZL state factory in 1937. Intended for use primarily as a fighter-bomber, the Polish Air Force also envisioned it replacing light fighters in long-range operations, along with being able to serve as a light bomber. Only two examples were built before the project was cancelled in favor of a planned improved variant, the PZL.48 Lampart (itself never built owing to the outbreak of WWII).

== Design and development ==
In 1934 the Polish Air Force ordered a new multi-role heavy fighter-bomber. It was initially slated to replace fighters in both pursuit and escort duties, and light bombers, along with attack aircraft. The idea of a long-range, twin-engined, relatively heavily-armed, multi-role strategic fighter was a popular concept among many air forces during the late Interwar Period, and would lead to many heavy fighter designs. Poland was not immune to this line of thought, and in an internal PZL competition a design of engineer Franciszek Misztal won and was given the designation PZL.38 Wilk. Its construction used the diminished aerodynamic profile and configuration from the PZL.37 Łoś medium bomber. The powerplant was to be the 490-hp PZL Foka (Seal) light-weight V-engine, designed by Stanisław Nowkuński of Polish Skoda Works (then PZL WS-1). Unfortunately, Nowkuński died in the Tatry mountains on 30 July 1936, and work on the engine slowed. Due to technical problems, overheating and vibration, it was decided to use a foreign engine.

In 1937 two prototypes of PZL.38 were built. The second one (PZl.38/II) received the American Ranger SGV-770B engines (420-450 hp), which were less powerful than the PZL "Foka" engine. As a result, the prototype didn't meet expected performance. The second prototype flew first in April or May 1936. The first prototype PZl.38/I, received the PZL Foka engine. The airplane was shown in 1938 at the Paris Air Show. It was flown only in February or March 1939 and also did not meet expected performance (estimated maximum speed was 520 km/h, while it hardly reached 465 km/h). It was also too heavy (2155 kg instead of 1715 kg) and had too small useful load. Because of these facts, further development of PZL.38 "Wilk" aircraft and "Foka" engine was abandoned in the spring of 1939, in a favour of the new construction PZL.48 "Lampart" - which was a modification of "Wilk" with radial engines.

== Description ==
It was a twin-engine low-wing cantilever monoplane of metal construction, metal covered. The fuselage was semi-monocoque, elliptic in cross-section. The crew of two - pilot and rear gunner/bombardier/observer sat under separate canopies, far from each other, fitted with dual controls. A canopy of pilot's cockpit opened aside. Three part wing, outer parts were built around light closed profiles. Wings fitted with slats and split flaps. Twin vertical stabilizers. Engines in underwing nacelles. Retractable landing gear, with main wheels retracting into engine nacelles, and a rear skid. Three-blade variable (P.38/I) or two-blade fixed propellers (PZL.38/II). Fuel tanks in wings - 500 L. Armament: fixed 20 mm FK-A gun (planned) and two 7.92 mm PWU wz.36 machine guns in the fuselage nose, twin 7.92 mm PWU wz.37 machine gun of a rear gunner, hiding in the fuselage. It could carry one 300-kg bomb.

== Operational history ==
At the time of the German invasion of Poland, both prototypes were still not able to fly and remained in the factory at Okęcie in Warsaw. They were captured by the Germans in a damaged state, their further fate is not known.

== Specifications ==

Data from Polish Aircraft 1893–1939

General characteristics

- Crew: 2, pilot, rear gunner/bombardier
- Length: 8.35 m (27 ft 5 in)
- Wingspan: 11.05 m (36 ft 3 in)
- Height: 2.50 m (8 ft 2 in)
- Wing area: 19.0 m^{2} (205 sq ft)
- Aspect ratio: 6.43
- Empty weight: 1,715 kg (3,781 lb)
- Gross weight: 2,770 kg (6,107 lb)
- Powerplant: 2 × PZL Foka II air-cooled 8-cylinder V-engine, 310 kW (420 hp) each
- Propellers: 2-bladed

Performance

- Maximum speed: 465 km/h (289 mph, 251 kn) at 4,000 m (13,000 ft)
- Cruise speed: 400 km/h (250 mph, 220 kn) at sea level
- Range: 1,250 km (780 mi, 670 nmi)
- Service ceiling: 10,000 m (33,000 ft) estimated
- Wing loading: 146 kg/m^{2} (30 lb/sq ft)
- Power/mass: 0.22 kw/kg (0.13 hp/lb)

Armament

- 1 x 20 mm FK-A cannon fixed in nose
- 2 x 7.92 mm PWU wz.36 machine guns fixed in nose
- 2 x 7.92 mm PWU wz.37 machine guns movable at the upper rear
- 300 kg bombs

== See also ==
Related development

- PZL.48 Lampart
- PZL.54 Ryś

Aircraft of comparable role, configuration, and era

- Breguet 690
- Focke-Wulf Fw 57
- Fokker G.I
- Henschel Hs 124
- Kawasaki Ki-45
- Messerschmitt Bf 110
- Potez 63
