= Rkm wz. 28 =

Ręczny karabin maszynowy wz. 28
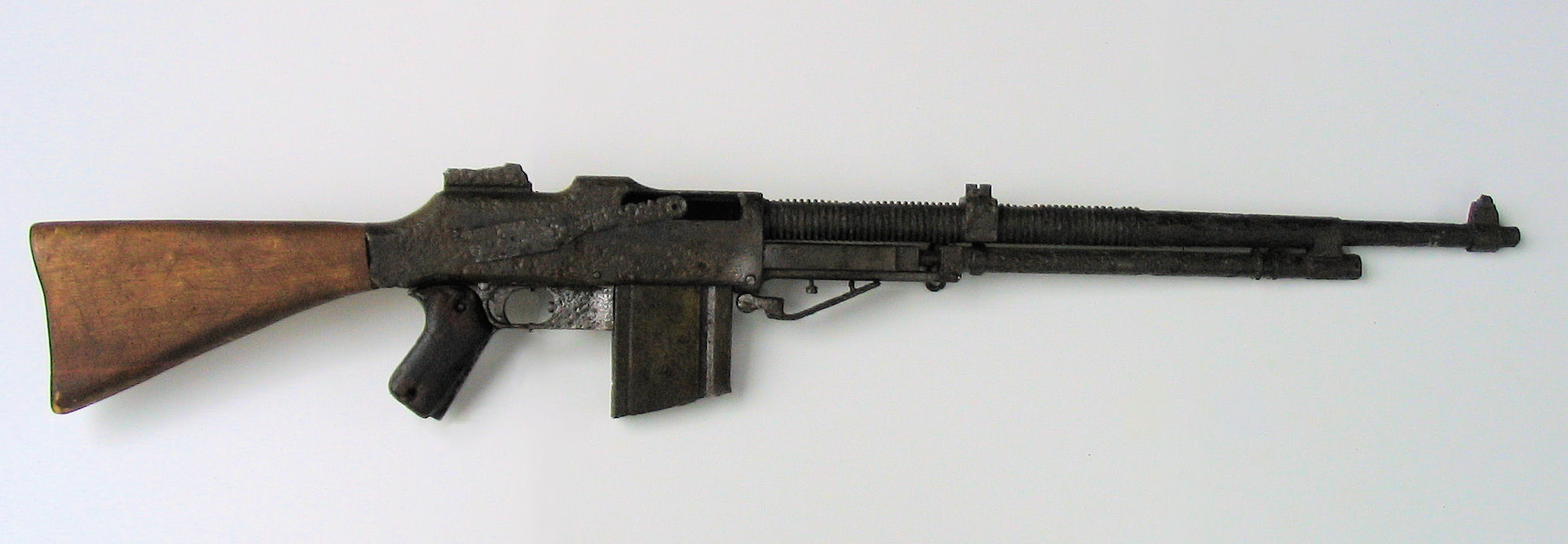
- Type: Automatic rifle Light machine gun
- Place of origin: Poland

Service history
- In service: 1930–1945
- Used by: See § Users
- Wars: Spanish Civil War; World War II

Production history
- Designer: FN Herstal
- Designed: 1928
- Manufacturer: Państwowa Fabryka Karabinów
- Produced: 1930–1939
- No. built: ~14,000
- Variants: Klo wz.37

Specifications
- Mass: 9.0 kg (19.84 lb) (empty)
- Length: 1,110 mm (43.7 in)
- Barrel length: 611 mm (24.06 in)
- Cartridge: 7.92×57mm Mauser
- Caliber: 7.92 mm
- Action: Gas-operated
- Rate of fire: 600 Rounds/min
- Muzzle velocity: 853 m/s (2,800 ft/s)
- Effective firing range: 600 m (660 yd)
- Feed system: 20-round detachable box magazine
- Sights: Rear leaf, front post Sight radius: 742 mm (29.2 in)

The Rkm wz. 28 (or Browning wz. 28) is a Polish derivative of the M1918 Browning Automatic Rifle. It was used as a light machine gun by the Polish Military and Polish Resistance forces during World War II.

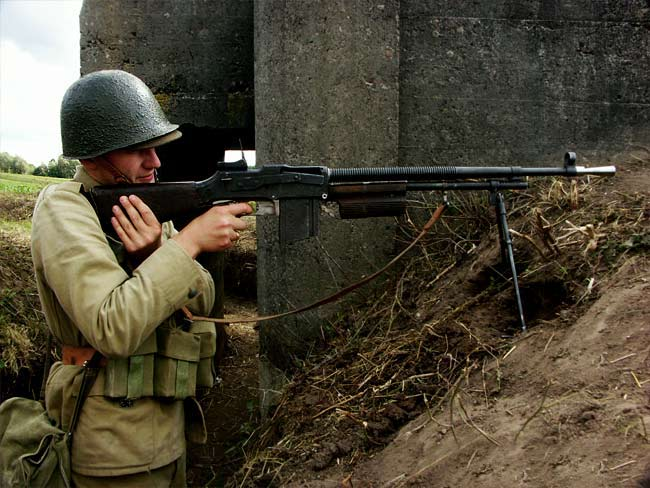
A Polish reenactor poses with the wz. 1928 and period-correct uniform.

Chosen after a competition between similar weapons, the BAR design was modified by FN Herstal to meet Polish requirements and then licence-produced by the Państwowa Fabryka Karabinów.

== History ==
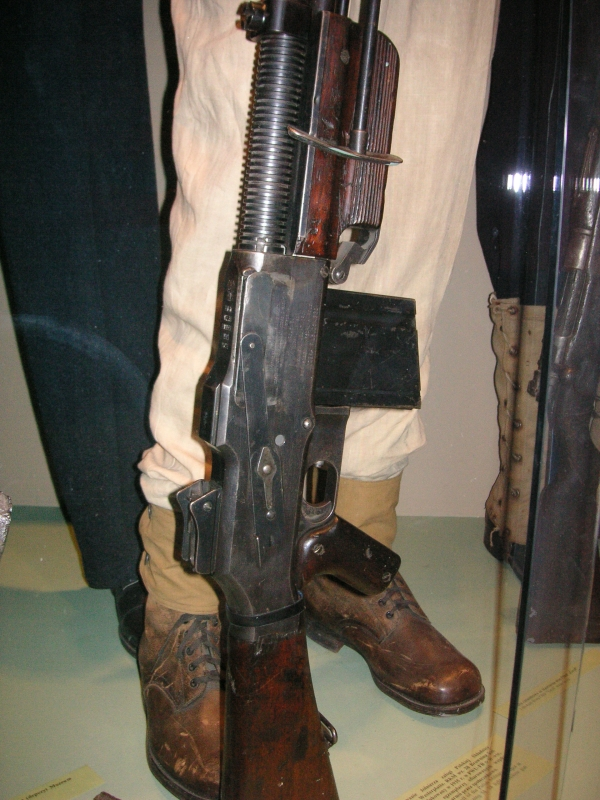
Firing mechanism

After Poland regained its independence in 1918, the Polish Army was equipped with all sorts of machine guns inherited from the armed forces of the partitioners, along with equipment from the French and British armies that equipped the Polish Blue Army during World War I. The large variety of light machine guns used, as well as the fact that each of them used a different caliber, made troop training and logistics a difficult task.

After the Polish-Soviet War, in 1923 a competition was opened for a new, standard light machine gun for the Polish army that was to replace all previously used types of LMG. The competition ended without a winner and the following year the Polish Ministry of War purchased 12 specimens of the M1918 Browning Automatic Rifle, Lewis gun ("Lewis wz. 1923") and Hotchkiss M1909 Benét–Mercié each. Testing proved the superiority of the American construction, and during the 1925 competition, a Belgian FN-made Browning was chosen. Although extensive tests were continued, the Polish army ordered a series of Belgian-made BAR machine guns, modified to better suit the Polish needs. The modifications included changing the round from .30-06 Springfield to standard Polish 7.92×57mm Mauser), the construction of a bipod and mounting, and the iron sights (peephole changed to v-notch type). The barrel was lengthened for greater accuracy and a pistol grip was added for easier aiming. Apart from the 10,000 pieces ordered from Fabrique Nationale, Poland also bought a license to produce the weapon domestically. The first wz.28 LMGs were officially commissioned in 1927 and were officially designated 7,92 mm rkm Browning wz. 1928, which is Polish for "7.92 mm hand-held machine gun of Browning pattern 1928".

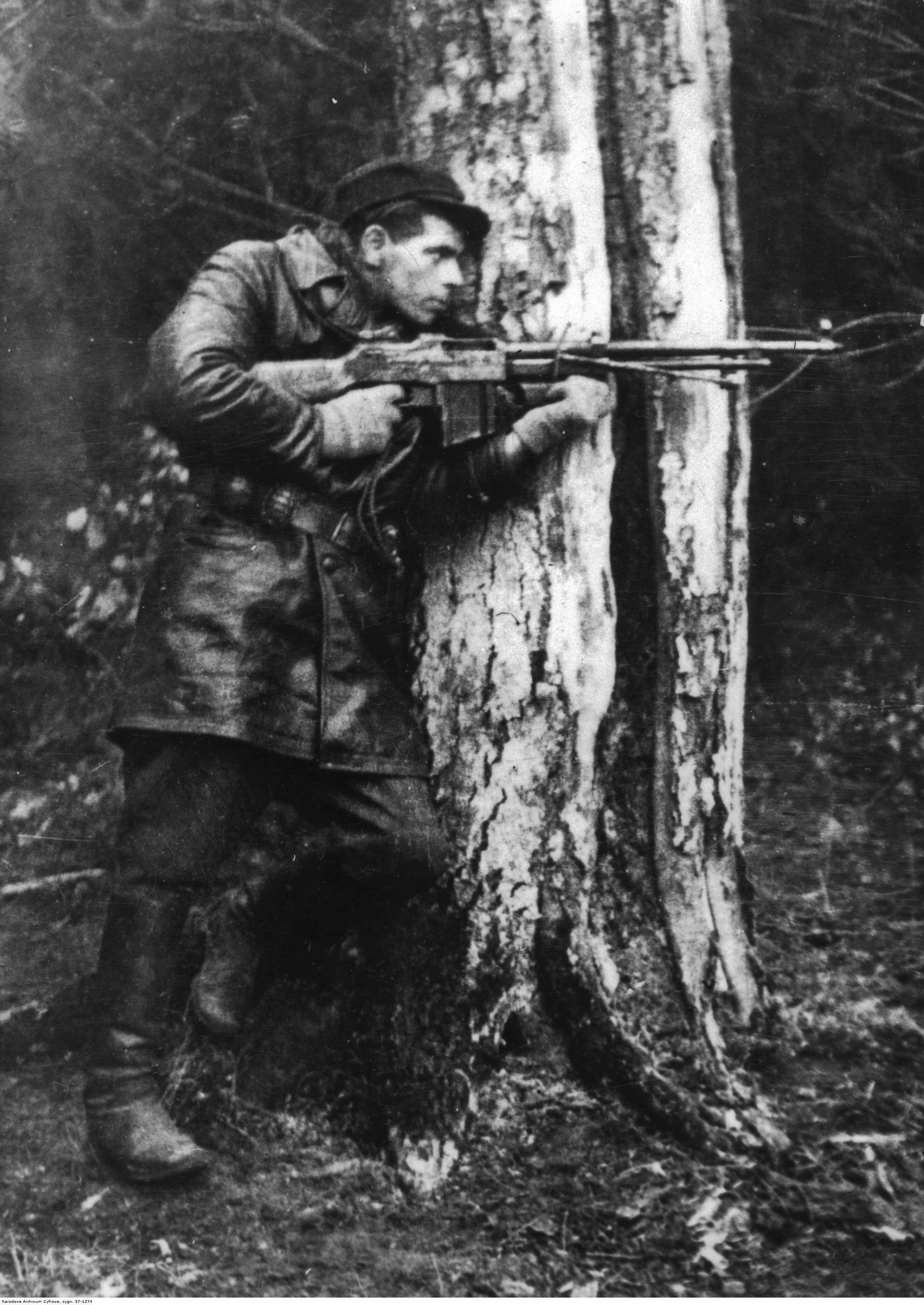
Polish partisan member of Home Army unit Jędrusie with wz. 1928

Due to serious flaws in license documentation purchased from Belgium, production in Poland was not started until 1930. Until 1939 approximately 14,000 pieces were built. Additional modifications were introduced during the production run. Among them was the replacement of the iron sights with a smaller version and reshaping the butt to a "fish tail" shape. There were also extensive works on spare, replaceable barrels for the weapon, which however were never completed due to the outbreak of World War II. The rkm wz. 28 was a basis for development of an aerial, flexible machine gun, designated karabin maszynowy obserwatora wz. 37, used mainly on the PZL.37 Łoś bombers.

During the German-Soviet Invasion of Poland of 1939, the rkm wz. 28 was the standard LMG used by almost all Polish infantry and cavalry units. The German armed forces captured a number of Polish-made Browning guns and used them until the end of World War II under the designation of l.MG 154/1(p) and l.MG 154/2(p) (or lMG 28 (p)). A number were also seized by the Red Army and used during the war.

== Users ==
- Republic of China – Supplied in small quantities by the Soviet Union in 1940
- Kingdom of Greece
- Germany – Captured in 1939
- Poland
- Soviet Union – Captured in 1939
- Spanish Republic – Bought for Spanish Civil War
- Spanish State – Captured from Republican side
