= Dana Demkiv =

Ukrainian ballet master (born 1932)

- Дана Демків
- Born: 26 March 1932; Lubaczów, Lviv Voivodeship, Second Polish Republic
- Education: Kyiv National University of Culture and Arts
- Occupations: Ballet master; ethnographer
- Known for: Founder and long-time director of the folk-dance ensemble "Pokuttia"
- Awards

Dana Petrivna Demkiv (Ukrainian: Дана Петрівна Демків; born March 26, 1932) is a Ukrainian ballet master and ethnographer. She is known as the founder and long-time director of the folk-dance ensemble "Pokuttia". She is a recipient of the Order of Princess Olga of 2nd and 3rd classes.

== Biography ==
She was born on March 26, 1932 in Lubaczów. In 1946, during the deportation of Ukrainians from Poland to the Ukrainian SSR, her family ended up in the city of Kalush. In 1951, she graduated from secondary school No. 1 in Kalush.

In 1951-1953, she studied at the music school in Ivano-Frankivsk, and in 1953-1955, she studied at the Kyiv National University of Culture and Arts. Demkiv also finished the evening music school for adults in Kyiv.

From 1956 to 1963, she was an actress at the Ukrainian Dramatical Theater named after Yaroslav Halan in Kolomyia. In 1963, she founded and then headed a dance group at the City House of Culture (since 1973, the Folk Amateur Dance Ensemble "Pokuttia") and a ballroom dancing studio (operating until 1969).

As a choreographer, she collaborated with Vasyl Symchych during the production of the plays “Zaporozhets za Dunayem” by Gulak-Artemovskyi, “Naimychka”, “Kateryna” based on Taras Shevchenko, “Natalka Poltavka” by I. Kotlyarevskyi in 1963-1965. She staged dances for the play “Danylo Galytsky” based on A. Khyzhniak (Ivano-Frankivsk Ukrainian Musical and Drama Theater named after Ivan Franko).

Since 1970, he began to engage in ethnographic activities, studying the culture of Sniatyn, Kolomyia, Horodenka and Nadvirna regions.

Her ensemble "Pokuttia" became a laureate and diploma winner of many national and international competitions: the Republican Festival of Folk Art (Kyiv, 1967), the Republican Festival of Amateur Art (Kyiv, 1970), the First All-Union Festival of Folk Art (Kyiv, 1990); international folklore festivals in Greece (gold medal in 1988 and 1990), the USA (1990), and Ukraine (Kyiv, 1990). The Ukrtelefilm studio shot the film "Dancing Pokuttia" (Kyiv, directed by O. Biyma, 1986). In 1973, a dance pair of her students (Sasha Smykavchuk and Lida Chalenko) won a gold medal at the All-Ukrainian Ballroom Dancing Competition in Kyiv.

Her ensemble actively toured in the countries of Europe and the USA from 1981 to 1999.

Dana Demkiv was a member of the jury of various international and all-Ukrainian choreographic festivals (Second All-Union Ballroom Dance Festival in Kyiv (1973), Festival of Ukrainian Ethnic and Diaspora Arts in Kyiv (1999), International Children's Festival-Competition of Folk Dances in Kharkiv (1990s and 2000s), All-Ukrainian Festival-Competition of Folk Choreography named after P. Virsky in Kyiv (2002)). As part of the celebration in Kyiv of the 100th anniversary of the birth of the outstanding Ukrainian dancer Vasyl Avramenko (1995), she gave a report on the hero of the day and gave a lecture-concert with the participation of her ensemble "Pokuttia".

Dana Demkiv participated in the fourth episode "The Sentence" of the Ukrainian television film "Love Island" as the leader of the folk dance ensemble "Pokuttia".

In 1992, she was nominated for the Taras Shevchenko National Prize.

== Awards ==
- Member 2nd Class of the Order of Princess Olga (2017)
- Member 3rd Class of the Order of Princess Olga (2009)
- Jubilee Medal "20 Years of Independence of Ukraine" (2011)
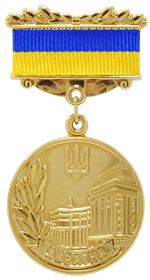
- Honorary Diploma of the Cabinet of Ministers of Ukraine (2003)
- Honorary Citizen of Kolomyia (2002)
- Honored Worker of Culture of Ukraine (1989)
