= Bomber Brigade =

The Bomber Brigade (Polish: Brygada Bombowa) was a World War II unit of the Polish Air Force commanded by płk obs. Władysław Heller. It resisted the Invasion of Poland in 1939 as the main aerial reserve of the commander in chief and was used for bombing enemy units in central Poland. It was created just before the war and did not have time to reach full operational readiness. Its equipment consisted of 36 modern PZL.37 Łoś medium bombers, 50 older PZL.23 Karaś light bombers, as well as 21 support planes. It was organised into four squadrons, each in turn composed of two escadrilles. It was similar in make-up to the Pursuit Brigade.

- Polish 2nd Bomber Squadron (II Dywizjon Bombowy), commanded by mjr pil. Jan Biały
  - Polish 21st Bomber Escadrille (21. Eskadra Bombowa), commanded by kpt. obs. Jan Buczma
  - Polish 22nd Bomber Escadrille (22. Eskadra Bombowa), commanded by kpt. pil. Kazimierz Słowiński

- Polish 6th Bomber Squadron (VI Dywizjon Bombowy), commanded by mjr obs. Alfred Bartłomiej Peszke
  - Polish 64th Bomber Escadrille (64. Eskadra Bombowa), commanded by kpt. pil. Mieczysław Pronaszko
  - Polish 65th Bomber Escadrille (65. Eskadra Bombowa), commanded by kpt. pil. Maciej Piotrowski

- Polish 10th Bomber Squadron (X Dywizjon Bombowy), commanded by ppłk. pil. Józef Werakso

10th Bomber Squadron was previously called: "210 Dywizjon".

  - Polish 211th Bomber Escadrille (211. Eskadra Bombowa), commanded by kpt. obs. Franciszek Omylak
  - Polish 212th Bomber Escadrille (212. Eskadra Bombowa), commanded by kpt. pil. Stanisław Taras-Wołkowiński

- Polish 15th Bomber Squadron (XV Dywizjon Bombowy), commanded by kpt. pil. Stanisław Cwynar

15th Bomber Squadron was previously called: "215 Dywizjon".

  - Polish 216th Bomber Escadrille (216. Eskadra Bombowa), commanded by kpt. obs. Władysław Dukszto
  - Polish 217th Bomber Escadrille (217. Eskadra Bombowa), commanded by kpt. obs. Eugeniusz Prusiecki

Some reports mention another Bomber Squadron called:

- Polish 20th Bomber Squadron (XX Dywizjon Bombowy)

20th Bomber Squadron was previously called: "220 Dywizjon".

- Polish 55th Independent Bomber Escadrille (55. Samodzielna Eskadra Bombowa), commanded by kpt. obs. Józef Skibiński
- Liaison platoon No. 4 (Pluton łącznikowy nr 4)
- Liaison platoon No. 12 (Pluton łącznikowy nr 12)

Another small Bomber unit was the Flight based at Dęblin, the Polish Air Force Training Academy. During the Invasion of Poland, their unit flew many operations using PZL.23 Karaś light bombers.

== Bibliography ==
- Belcarz, Bartlomiej; Peczkowski, Robert (2001). White Eagles: The Aircraft, Men and Operations of the Polish Air Force 1918–1939. Ottringham, UK: Hikoki Publications. ISBN 1-902109-73-2.
