= Franciszek Misztal =

Polish aircraft designer

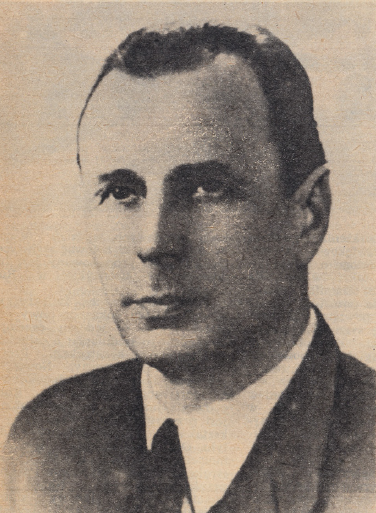

Franciszek Misztal (15 March 1901, Lisie Jamy near Lubaczów – 9 June 1981, Warsaw) was a Polish aircraft designer.

He studied at Lviv Polytechnic and received his doctorate in 1929 at the Technical University in Aachen. From 1928 he worked in the PZL in Warsaw as a constructor. Contributor to the design of aircraft PZL.23 Karaś (caisson wings), PZL.19, PZL.26 and the chief designer (and author of the concept) of PZL.38 Wilk. Inventor of the caisson structure with corrugated wings.

During World War II he taught mechanics in Warsaw. After the war, the founder of CSS construction bureau, then professor at the Warsaw University of Technology and the Institute of Aviation, where together with Leszek Dulęba he constructed the prototype 4-engine passenger aircraft PZL MD-12, and the secretary of Division IV of the Polish Academy of Sciences.
