= Alfred Bartłomiej Peszke =

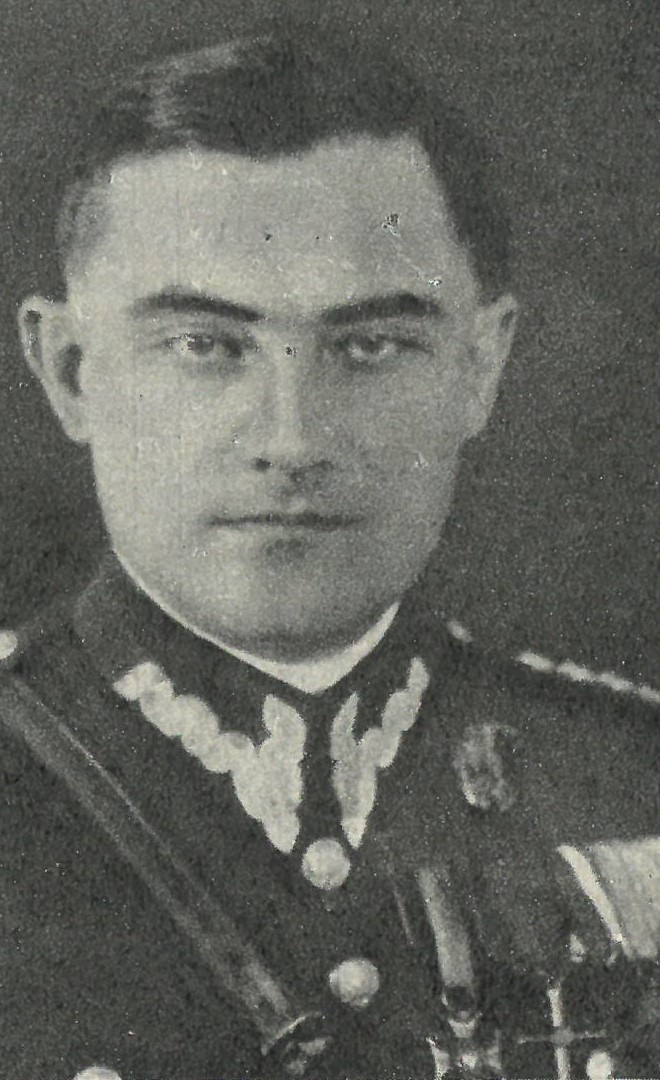
Alfred Peszke

Alfred Bartłomiej Peszke (born 14 December 1899, died 3 March 1966 in Croydon) was a Polish Air Force officer, infantry veteran of the Polish-Soviet War (1919-1921) and Air Force veteran of the September 1939 Campaign.

== Military service ==
During September 1939, Peszke was commander of the Polish 6th Bomber Squadron, part of Bomber Brigade. Evacuated to France and Britain, he continued serving with the Polish Air Force as a Polish liaison officer with Britain's Royal Air Force and in 1944 had become chief of air force planning at the Staff of the Polish Commander in Chief in London. In December 1946, he was discharged with the rank of lieutenant colonel.

== Family ==
His son, Michael Alfred Peszke, was an American psychiatrist and Polish military historian.

== See also ==
- Polish contribution to World War II
- Invasion of Poland
- Polish Air Forces in France and Great Britain
