= Peszek =

Peszek is a family name, originating from Poland. Notable people with the surname include:

- Samantha Peszek (born 1991), American artistic gymnast
- Maria Peszek (born 1973), Polish singer
- Tom Peszek (born 1985), American rower
- Jan Peszek (born 1944), Polish actor
