= Karabin lotniczy wz. 37 =

Karabin lotniczy obserwatora wz. 37
- Type: aerial, flexible machine gun
- Place of origin: Poland

Service history
- In service: 1937 to 1949
- Used by: See Users
- Wars: World War II

Production history
- Designed: 1937
- Manufacturer: Państwowa Fabryka Karabinów
- Produced: 1937 to 1939
- No. built: 339-24,000

Specifications
- Mass: 7 kg (15 lb) (empty)
- Length: 1,110 mm (44 in)
- Barrel length: 611 mm (24.1 in)
- Cartridge: 8x57mm IS
- Caliber: 7.92mm
- Action: gas operated
- Rate of fire: 1100 round/min
- Muzzle velocity: 853 m/s (2,800 ft/s)
- Feed system: 91 rounds

The karabin lotniczy obserwatora wz. 37 (Polish for "observers aviation rifle pattern 1937") is an aerial machine gun, a development of the ręczny karabin maszynowy wz. 28. It was designed as a manually operated machine gun for defensive firing positions on board combat aircraft of Polish Military Aviation.

== History ==
In the mid-1930s, Polish small arms designer Wawrzyniec Lewandowski was given the task of developing a flexible gun based on the rkm wz. 28 light machine gun. The desired changes included raising the cyclical rate of fire to 1100 rds/min, replacing the buttstock with a spade grip at the rear of receiver, moving the main spring under barrel and, most importantly, changing the feed system.

The gun's original 20 round box magazine was impractical with the gun's high rate of fire. A new feeding mechanism was added as a pack to the standard receiver. It contained a spring-loaded lever, which when cammed by the lock during locking would grab a round from a 91-round pan magazine located above the receiver and force the round into alignment to feed during unlocking. The weapon is the world's only specialised aerial flexible machine gun based closely on the Browning M1918, or "Browning Automatic Rifle". The wz. 37 was dubbed "Szczeniak" (Polish for "pup") due to its lightness and compactness compared to Vickers E and Vickers F machine guns it was intended to replace and the "barking" sound it made when shooting. During World War II the wz. 37 was used onboard PZL.37 Łoś bomber and LWS-3 Mewa reconnaissance aircraft.

This machine gun was also intended as a standard on-board weapon for other aircraft that did not manage to enter service before the outbreak of the war (PZL.46 Sum, PZL.48 Lampart, PZL.49 Miś).

== Users ==
- Germany
- Poland
- Romania
- Soviet Union

== Similar Weapons ==
- MG 42, Nazi Germany
