= PZL.37 Łoś =

Polish medium bomber of WW2

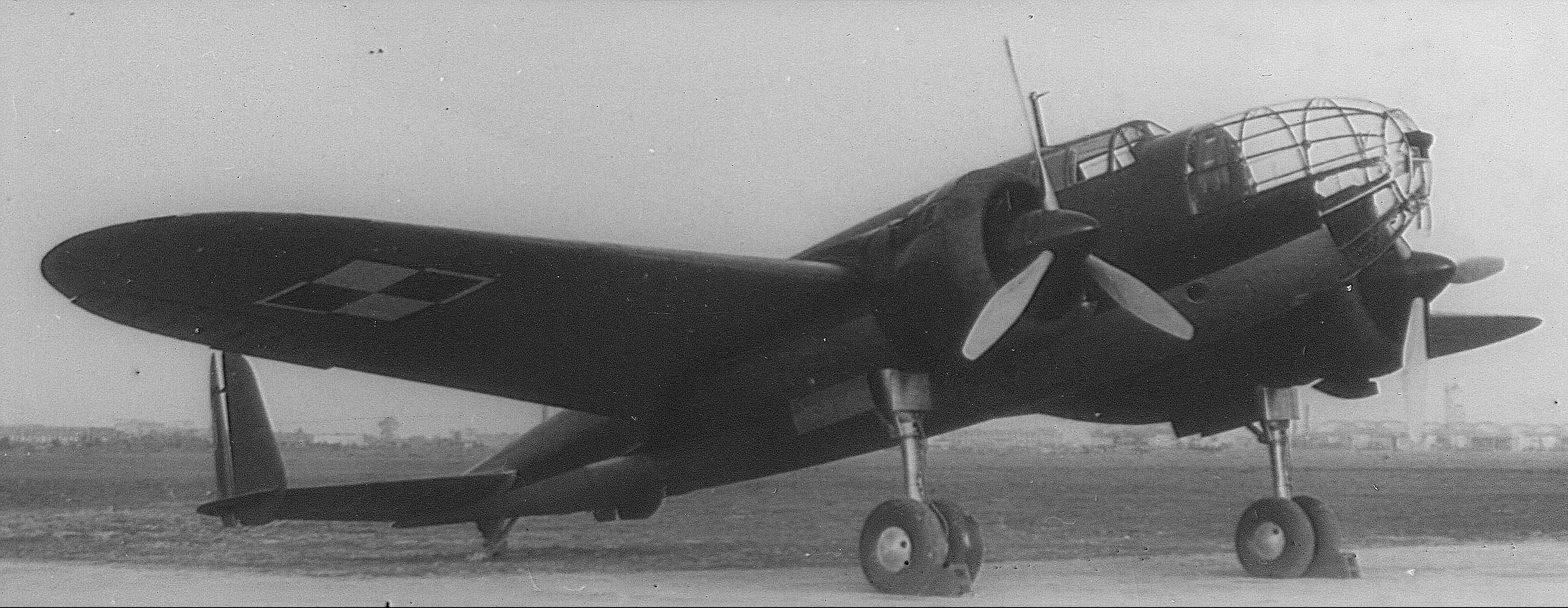
- PZL.37Abis Łoś

General information
- Type: Medium bomber
- Manufacturer: Państwowe Zakłady Lotnicze
- Primary user: Polish Military Aviation
- Number built: over 120

History
- Manufactured: 1938–1939
- Introduction date: 1938
- First flight: 30 June 1936
- Retired: 1944 (Romanian Air Force)

The PZL.37 Łoś ('moose') was a Polish twin-engined medium bomber designed and manufactured by national aircraft company Państwowe Zakłady Lotnicze (PZL). It is sometimes incorrectly referred to as "PZL P.37", but the letter "P" was reserved for fighters of Zygmunt Puławski's design (such as the PZL P.11).

Upon its introduction to service, it was popularly considered to be not only the most modern and effective weapon then possessed by Poland, but also to be one of the most advanced bombers then operational in the world. From mid-1938 onwards, interest was expressed by various nations in potential export sales of the PZL.37; in response to this highly favourable reception, PZL, being keen to meet the demands, developed additional variants that were intended for the export market, such as the PZL.37C (which was to be powered by a pair of Gnome-Rhone 14N-0/1 radial engines). An improved enlarged derivative, known as the PZL.49 Miś, was also developed for the Polish Air Force.

The Łoś was extensively used in the defense of Poland during the invasion of Poland by Nazi Germany in September 1939. On 1 September 1939, the Polish Air Force had roughly 86 PZL.37s in total, but less than a half of those actually saw active combat use due to aircraft being used by training units, being in maintenance, or having been held in reserve. The bombers suffered from a high attrition rate due to lack of fighter protection, and the final Polish combat missions were performed on 19 September. In October 1940, around 26-27 of the PZL.37s that had been evacuated from Poland were seized by the Romanian government and 23 of these aircraft were subsequently used by the Royal Romanian Air Force in the invasion of the Soviet Union.

== Development ==
=== Background ===
Throughout the majority of the interwar period, the dominant military philosophies and practices within the leadership of Poland was that aircraft were of a secondary importance and a separate air-oriented service within the Polish Armed Forces would be of questionable value. Instead, it was decided to develop the nation's aviation assets to principally function as a means of providing aerial support to the newly formed Polish Land Forces. As such, a relatively minimal budget was allocated for aviation matters while no dedicated doctrine in respect to air power was developed, neither was an effective bomber force pursued in any form throughout much of this period and, when such a force was established, it was met with controversy and heavy criticism from officers who were sceptical that Poland required any bomber aircraft at all.

Despite this unpromising lack of interest, a separate service, known as the Wojska Lotnicze (Polish Air Force), had been formed during 1918. During the Polish–Soviet War of 1919, there had been proposals mooted for the formation of a specialised bomber group equipped with modified Breguet 14 B2 biplanes; however, these were not quickly followed up upon due to a lack of understanding and appreciation amongst senior officers. During April 1920, the first Polish bomber squadron was stood up at Poznań–Ławica Airport, Greater Poland, equipped with a variety of captured ex-German aircraft such as Gotha G.IVs, AEG G.IVs, and Friedrichshafen G.IIIs. However, following the end of the conflict with the Soviets, this bomber squadron was amalgamated with a reconnaissance-orientated squadron.

During 1920, the Polish Air Force heavily benefited from an extensive re-armament and expansion programme headed by General Włodzimierz Zagórski, under which the formation of dedicated bomber regiments was envisioned. Accordingly, an order was placed for 32 French-built Farman F.68 BN.4 Goliath twin-engined night bombers, with which it was intended to equip and launch these squadrons. An additional pair of army co-operation squadrons were repurposed as light bomber units instead, equipped with French Potez XV B2 aircraft. Unfortunately, Zagórski's reforms were abandoned following the May Coup led by Józef Piłsudski.

Throughout the 1920s and 1930s, some officials within Poland remained interested in the establishment of a national bomber force, in some cases for prestige value rather than in terms of strict military value. During 1927, the Department of Aeronautics authorised the development of the Lublin R-VIII, a large single-engined reconnaissance bomber. In the following year, the department ordered Polish aviation manufacturer Państwowe Zakłady Lotnicze (PZL) to make preparations towards the development of a heavy multi-engined night bomber; while numerous proposals and design studies were made by both PZL and private factories, but none were approved for further development by the department. Instead, it was decided to procure a number of Dutch-built Fokker F.VII to meet the bomber role, the first of which being delivered during 1929, despite condemnation of the aircraft's poor defensive armament, limited payload capacity, and excessive weight.

=== Emergence ===
Despite not being approved for further development, PZL decided to independently continue refining their designs for a multi-engined night bomber. These studies, led by aircraft engineer Wladyslaw Zalewski, developed an advanced concept for an all-metal low-wing cantilever monoplane bomber known as the PZL.3. The bomber was to be powered by an arrangement of four Bristol Jupiter radial engines positioned in tandem pairs and armed with a pair of side-mounted gun turrets in addition to an internally-stowed bombload of 3,000 kg (6,613 lb). However, during December 1930, all work on this concept was abandoned as an economy measure and the construction of a prototype was abandoned. Reportedly, technical data for the PZL.3 was later received by French manufacturer Potez.

During the 1930s, discussions were held regarding a potential replacement of Poland's Fokker F.VIIs. Numerous concepts were explored by the Department of Aeronautics, the most impressive submission was deemed to have been made by Polish aeronautical engineer Jerzy Dąbrowski, who had produced the initial proposals that would lead to the PZL.37 during spring 1934 and submitted to the department in July 1934. The concept was of a very quick monoplane bomber manned by a crew of four, featuring all-metal stressed-skin construction and powered by a pair of radial engines capable of producing 800–1,200 hp. The airframe was aerodynamically clean and was to be capable of very high performance, far in advance of contemporary bombers; wind tunnel testing using scale models of the aircraft were extremely encouraging.

During October 1934, the instruction to proceed with the proposal, initially designated P.37, was received by PZL. An express priority was placed upon performance over armament and equipment, relying upon its high speed for its defence; as such, only a single 7.7 mm machine gun was allocated to each turret position instead of the twin-guns and 20 mm dorsal cannon previously considered. On 14 April 1935, the department issued its approval of a full-scale wooden mock-up of the aircraft, authorising the construction of a pair of prototypes along with a structural test frame.

During early 1936, the necessity of revising the design's structure delayed the construction of the partially-assembled first prototype. During May 1936, the prototype commenced ground testing and taxiing trials; however, on 15 June, while being rolled out for its intended first flight, an engine failure was sustained prior to the attempt, resulting in its delay. On 30 June 1936, the first PZL.37/I prototype, which was fitted with a single vertical stabilizer, performed its maiden flight successfully. In August 1936, the initial factory tests were completed, after which the first prototype participated in official airworthiness and service trials. These revealed a handful of shortcomings, including rear fuselage flutter, excessive vibration on the instrumentation panel, overheating of the cylinder heads, and criticism of the cockpit's lack of space, however, test pilots were typically highly impressed with the aircraft.

In response to the feedback from the first prototype's testing, several improvements and other modifications were made, some of which were introduced on the original prototype while more extensive changes were introduced upon the second prototype designated as PZL.37/II. This second prototype featured the adoption of twin-vertical stabilizers, a re-worked cockpit and an altered ventral gun position amongst other changes, functioned as a representative aircraft of the anticipated production bomber and performed its first flight during autumn 1936. Suitably impressed, the department accepted the aircraft for production, placing an initial order for 10 pre-production aircraft, as well as bestowing a name upon the bomber, Łoś.

=== Production ===
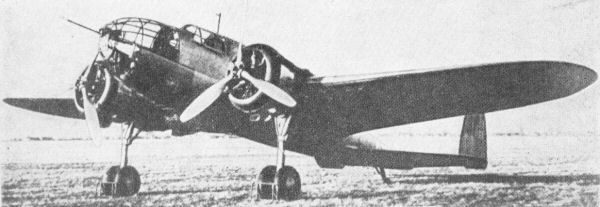
The second prototype PZL.37/II

Production of the Łoś commenced during the winter of 1936–1937. During 1938, the first 10 serial aircraft were manufactured, designated as PZL.37A; these were furnished with a single vertical stabilizer. The next 19 interim aircraft were constructed to the PZL.37A bis standard, having been outfitted with the newer twin tail configuration. All of these aircraft were powered by the British-developed Bristol Pegasus XII B radial engine, which was produced in Poland under licence.

The main production variant, the PZL.37B (or: Łoś II), was furnished with the twin tail arrangement along with newer Pegasus XX engines. During autumn 1938, production of the PZL.37B commenced for the Polish Air Force. During the initial period of service, 2 prototypes and 6 serial aircraft were lost in separate crashes; these had been caused by several technical problems, most of which involved the rudder seizing (due to being aero-dynamically overbalanced) and consequent total loss of control. Following the implementation of some structural changes, the PZL.37B became a highly reliable aircraft. By the outbreak of the Second World War, roughly 92 PZL.37 bombers had been produced and delivered to the Polish Air Force, and a further 31 were in different phases of production.

Prior to the Second World War, the PZL.37B Łoś was widely considered to be one of the most advanced bombers then operational in the world. It was able to carry a heavier bombload than considerably larger aircraft, such as the British-built Vickers Wellington, though over shorter range and the dimensions of the individual bombs were limited. Being smaller than most contemporary medium bombers, the Łoś was relatively fast and easy to handle. As a consequence of a favourable landing gear arrangement, having been fitted with double wheels, the bomber could operate from austere airstrips as well as rough fields or meadows. Typically amongst bombers of the late 1930s, its defensive armament consisted of only three machine guns, which subsequently proved too weak against enemy fighters in combat.

=== Export interest and further development ===
Starting with a presentation at a salon in Belgrade in June 1938 and in Paris in November, the PZL.37 met with a huge interest. For export purposes, new variants were developed: the PZL.37C with Gnome-Rhone 14N-0/1 radial engines of 985 cv (971 BHP, 724 kW), maximum speed 445 km/h and the PZL.37D with 14N-20/21 of 1,065 cv (1,050 BHP, 783 kW), maximum speed 460 km/h. In 1939, 20 PZL.37Cs were ordered by Yugoslavia, 12 by Bulgaria, 30 PZL.37Ds and license by Romania and 10, raw materials and parts for next 25 and license by Turkey and, finally, 12 aircraft for Greece.

The Belgian company Constructions Aéronautiques G. Renard was granted permission to perform the license production of between 20 and 50 aircraft for the Second Spanish Republic; however, the venture was abandoned due to the victory of the opposing Nationalists in the Spanish Civil War. In addition to the Belgian venture, it is known that Denmark, Estonia, Finland and Iran were all at various stages of negotiation for their own acquisitions of the type. The Polish military were not allowed to establish an arrangement with Iran due to "lack of production abilities". Though contrary to this, aircraft industries were already present in Iran since the 1920s until they were destroyed or dismantled by invading British forces during the Anglo-Soviet Invasion of Iran. Nevertheless, the outbreak of the war acted to prevent the production of any of these aircraft. At that time, PZL developed the next variant for the Polish Air Force, the PZL.49 Miś, but this was not completed before the war. Possessing slightly bigger dimensions, the Miś ("Bear") was to be fitted with Bristol Hercules II radial engines of 1,350 bhp (1,370 cv, 1,007 kW), capable of a maximum speed of 520 km/h along with the addition of an upper turret.

== Design ==
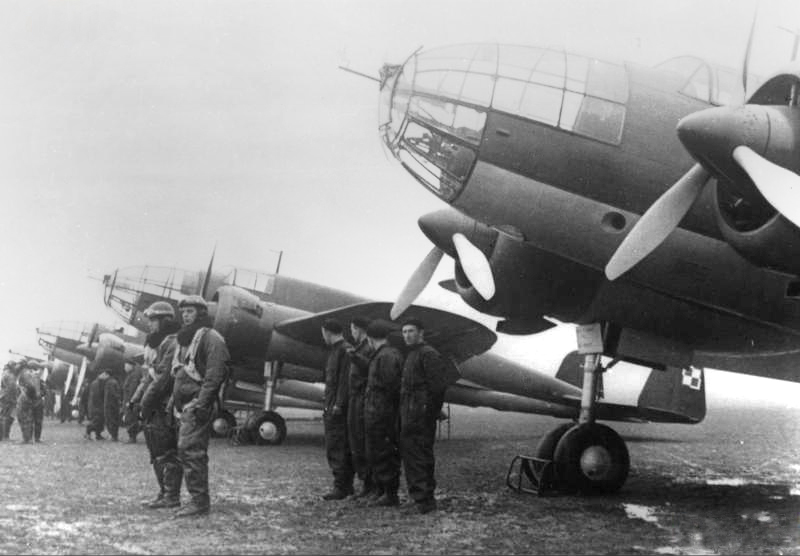
Polish PZL.37B Łoś medium bombers at a military airfield with a four-man crew

The PZL.37 Łoś was a twin-engined all-metal monoplane medium bomber. The first production variant PZL.37A was relatively conventional in layout, being outfitted with low-set wings, a single vertical stabilizer, and a metal-covered airframe. The late A series (designated Abis) and B series aircraft received a double vertical stabilizer which improved flight stability and increased the field of fire of the dorsal gunner. The aircraft was quite small for its bomb load and range; its carrying capacity was achieved in part by a lift-generating, airfoil-shaped fuselage, which was an innovative feature (previously used e.g. on PZL.26 sports plane). It was shorter and had smaller wings than its German and French counterparts but carried comparable bomb load and defensive armament. The crew consisted of four: pilot, commander-bombardier, radio operator and a dorsal gunner. The bombardier was accommodated in the glazed nose, with a forward-firing machine gun. The radio operator sat inside the fuselage, above the bomb bay, and also operated the ventral machine gun during combat.

The Łoś featured retractable main undercarriage, which retracted into purpose-built alcoves located within the engine nacelles. The undercarriage was double-wheeled, complete with independent suspension for each wheel. The bomber was powered by a pair of Bristol Pegasus radial engines; the PZL.37A model had Pegasus XII B engines (normal power: 860 BHP (873 cv, 642 kW), maximum: 940 BHP (953 cv, 701 kW)), the PZL.37B variant had Pegasus XX engines (normal power: 905 HP (918 cv, 675 kW), maximum: 970 BHP (984 cv, 723 kW)).

Originally, it was intended for a popular wing profile, designed by Ryszard Bartel (also used in many other successful Polish airframes incl. PZL P.11) to be used for the aircraft; however, the requirement of providing bomb storage with the internal space of the wings necessitated modification to the design. Some publications claim the resulting profile displayed laminar-flow properties (one of the first in the world), but this is disputed – its shape which resembled laminar flow wings developed in later years, but this was largely fortuitous, and at any rate achieving the laminar flow regime would have required additional construction features (most importantly extremely smooth wings shaped with extreme precision) (Note: For the difficulties in achieving this in the first purposely designed airplane aiming at laminar flow, the P-51 Mustang,) which the aircraft simply lacked. However, the profile did display lower drag than expected and the initial PZL.37A version possessed a maximal speed 10 per cent higher than the originally planned 360 km/h. The modified profile was viewed as highly successful and was later re-used for other projects (sometimes in further modified form; e.g. PZL.46 Sum, PZL.49 Miś, PZL.50 Jastrząb).

The bomber's offensive payload was spread across a two-section bomb bay set within the fuselage (providing space for up to 4 bombs) and a total of 8 compact bomb bays located in the central section of the wings (which had space for a maximum of 16 bombs). This arrangement of bomb bays imposed considerable restrictions on the types of bombs that could be carried, especially in the wing bays which were quite small due to the need to fit between the ribs of the wing. The maximum load was 2,580 kg (2 × 300 kg and 18 × 110 kg). Apart from a pair of 300 kg bombs in one of the fuselage bomb bays, it could not carry bombs larger than 110 kg. When flown at the maximum loadout, the majority of the weight of the bombs was carried inside the wings. There were no provisions for mounting bombs on the outside of the aircraft. During the invasion of Poland in 1939, 110 kg was the maximum weight used, since the 300 kg bombs were available only in small quantities, and were difficult to load at improvised airfields with little infrastructure. 50 kg bombs were also used. Maximal bomb load taken from soft surface runways was reduced to about 800–1200 kg.

== Operational history ==
=== Poland ===
During early 1938, the Polish Air Force started to receive the Łos A variant; it was followed by deliveries of the improved PZL.37B to operational units, which had been slowed by delays in supply of the Pegasus XX engines and other equipment, during the autumn of 1938. It was planned that by April 1939, the air force should have 128 aircraft but less than half had been accepted into service and half of those were early production not up to standard and issued to conversion training units. On 1 September 1939, the Polish Air Force had roughly 86 PZL.37s in total, but less than a half of those were used in combat. 36 PZL.37Bs were in four bomber escadres of a Bomber Brigade: the 11th, 12th, 16th and 17th escadres (two escadres with nine aircraft each, constituted a group, in Polish: dywizjon; the PZL.37 were in groups X and XV). The remainder of the Bomber Brigade's aircraft were PZL.23 Karaś. About 50 remaining PZL.37s were assigned to the reserve XX group, training units or in repairs. As a consequence of there only having been a few months available to train the crews and complete the equipping of the bombers, the planes were not fully ready when the war broke out. For example, the extra internal fuel tanks for the type were not yet in service, thus the maximum range of the bomber that had been quoted in specifications was in practice not achievable.

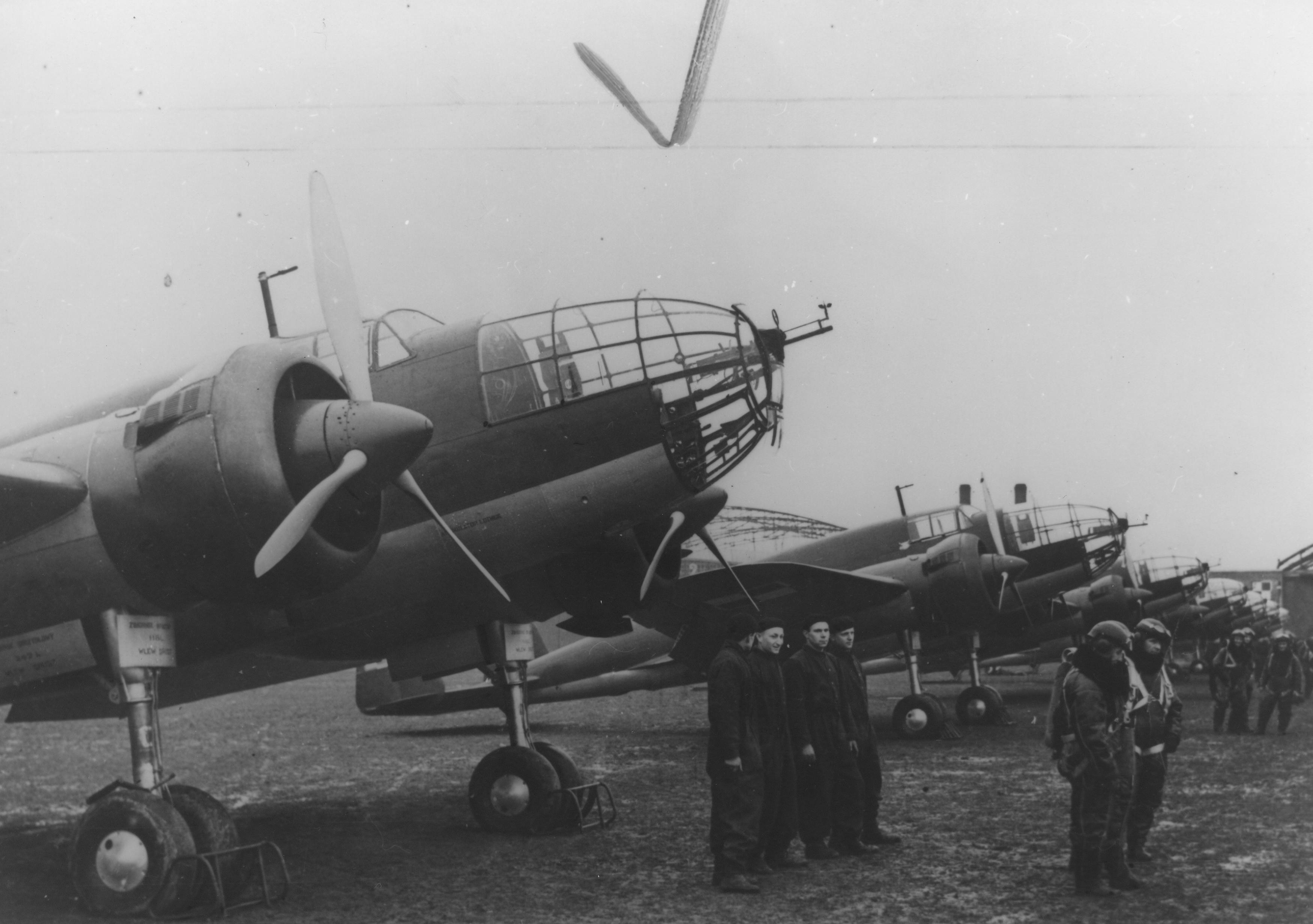
A group of Polish PZL.37B bombers on the ground, 1939

Only the PZL.37s of the Bomber Brigade actively participated in the defence of Poland. By 1 September, they had been deployed to rural improvised airfields, so they were not destroyed on the ground by the Germans in their initial attack on the main Polish airbases. However, because of this move away from developed airfields to short fields with poor surfaces, during the campaign the planes could take off with only a fraction of their maximum bomb load (typically 800 kg or 8 x 100 kg bombs), which limited their effectiveness. During the invasion of Poland, from 4 September onward the planes of the Bomber Brigade were attacking German armoured columns in day attacks, forced by the desperate situation to perform this mission for which they were not designed (the original plans to bomb targets inside Germany were quickly abandoned). Most notably, they hampered the advance of the XVI Army Corps near Częstochowa and Radomsko.

During these engagements, the PZL.37 suffered heavy losses as a result of a lack of adequate fighter protection, which was further amplified by the operational tactics employed, usually flying missions in units of no more than three aircraft at a time. The last combat flights took place on 16 September. During the campaign, the combat units were reinforced with several other aircraft, and about 46 PZL.37s were used in combat. Of the Bomber Brigade aircraft, ten PZL.37s were shot down by fighters, five shot down by enemy anti-aircraft artillery, two bombed on the ground and a further ten lost in other ways. A number of not fully completed, training or reserve PZL.37s were also destroyed on airfields and in factories (18 PZL.37s were bombed in a reserve base in Małaszewicze and in a factory in Warsaw – Okęcie).

=== Captured aircraft ===
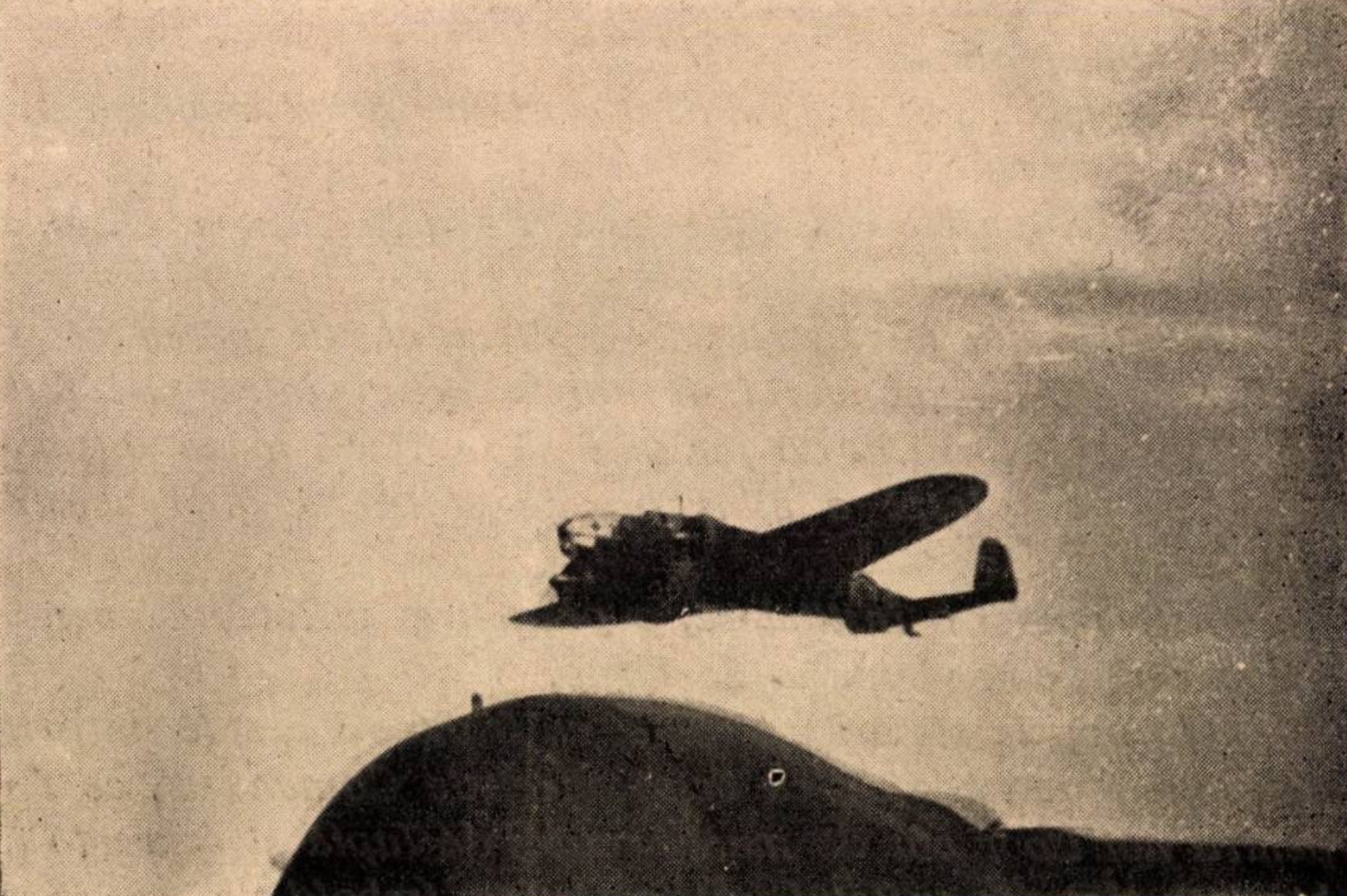
Romanian PZL.37 on a bombing mission

Twenty-six or twenty-seven Polish Air Force PZL.37s (17 from the Bomber Brigade and ten training ones) were withdrawn in 1939 to Romania. During October 1940, these aircraft were seized by the Romanian government and 23 of these aircraft would be used by the Royal Romanian Air Force in the 4th Group, consisting of the 76th and 77th bomber squadrons. Some were uparmed with four machine guns (the Polish PWU machineguns were still used). About one third were lost in crashes due to lack of experience of Romanian pilots with the PZL.37's handling and its high wing loading, and due to engine faults. About 15 were used in combat against the Soviet Union from 22 June 1941. Among others, they first operated in Bessarabia, while they were later used to conduct bombing missions targeting Kiev and Odessa. Some of the bombers were lost on these missions, mostly due to anti-aircraft fire. Because of a lack of spare parts, the remaining planes were withdrawn from the front in October 1941; after this, the type was mainly used for training. During April 1944, the 76th squadron returned to combat, with nine aircraft, but it was withdrawn from the front on 3 May 1944. After Romania joined the Allies, on 1 September 1944, German aircraft destroyed five PZL.37s on the ground during retaliatory attacks against Romanian targets.

Additionally, a number of captured planes underwent testing by both Nazi Germany and the Soviet Union. Relatively few PZL.37s fell into German hands, probably only two aircraft; this is partially due to the efforts of Polish factory workers who scrapped roughly 30 PZL.37s that remained in factories in Okęcie and Mielec, under the pretext of cleaning up the area, during October 1939, before the German authorities were able to reconnoiter.

== Preserved parts and replicas ==
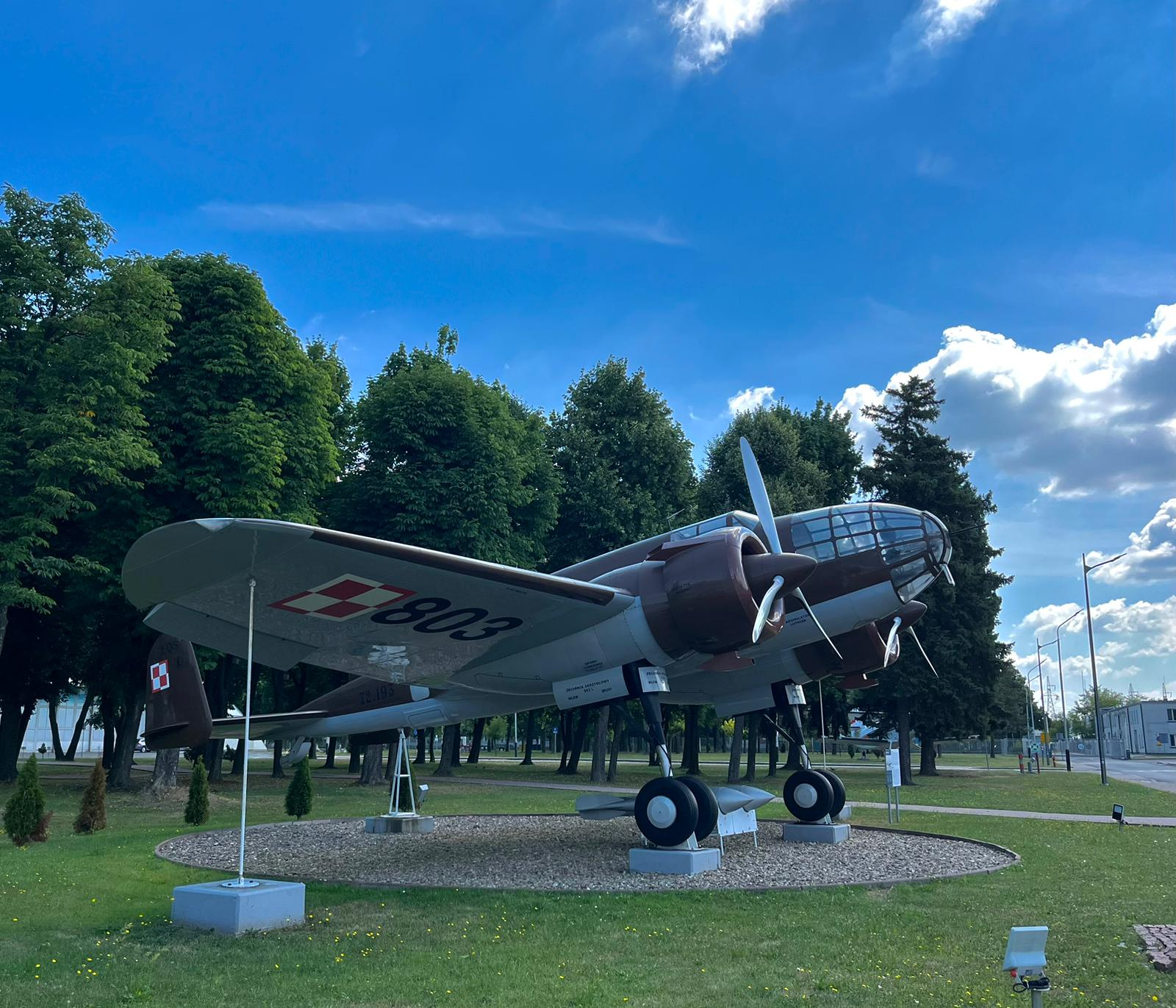
1:1 scale model of PZL.37 Łoś in Mielec

Bristol Pegasus engine used by PZL.37 Łoś on display at the Polish Aviation Museum in Kraków.

There are no surviving PZL.37 aircraft.

An original PZL Pegaz 20 engine of the type used in PZL.37 Łoś is in the collection of the Polish Aviation Museum in Kraków. This engine was sent from Poland to the United States in the spring of 1939 to be exhibited at the 1939 New York World's Fair and thus survived the war, and was returned to Poland in 2006.

A 1:1 scale non-flying model of PZL.37 Łoś was assembled at PZL Mielec factory, in the factory hall used to construct these bombers before the war. The dimensions of the model were determined only from photographs as very little of the original blueprints for the aircraft survive; nevertheless, the model's external shape matches the original very closely. It was constructed from aluminium and steel leftovers from aircraft under construction at the factory and was presented to the public in September 2012. The interior of the plane was not reproduced, except the bombardier's position in the nose. Currently the model is exhibited outdoors on the grounds of the Mielec factory.(50°18′36″N 21°27′40″E)

A number of crash sites of PZL.37 Łoś shot down in September, 1939 have been identified and aircraft parts have been recovered from them. One crash site has a simple 1:1 model of the aircraft displayed as a monument.

== Variants ==
PZL.37/I
First prototype with a single tail fin.
PZL.37/II
First prototype with a double tail fins and improvements.
PZL.37A
First 10 serial aircraft with single tail, Bristol Pegasus XIIB engines.
PZL.37Abis
Batch of 19 serial aircraft of A version with double tail fins.
PZL.37B version I and II
Main production variant with double tail fins and PZL Pegaz XX engines.
PZL.37C
Planned version with Gnome-Rhône 14N-01 engines.
PZL.37D
Planned version with Gnome-Rhône 14N-21 engines.

== Operators ==
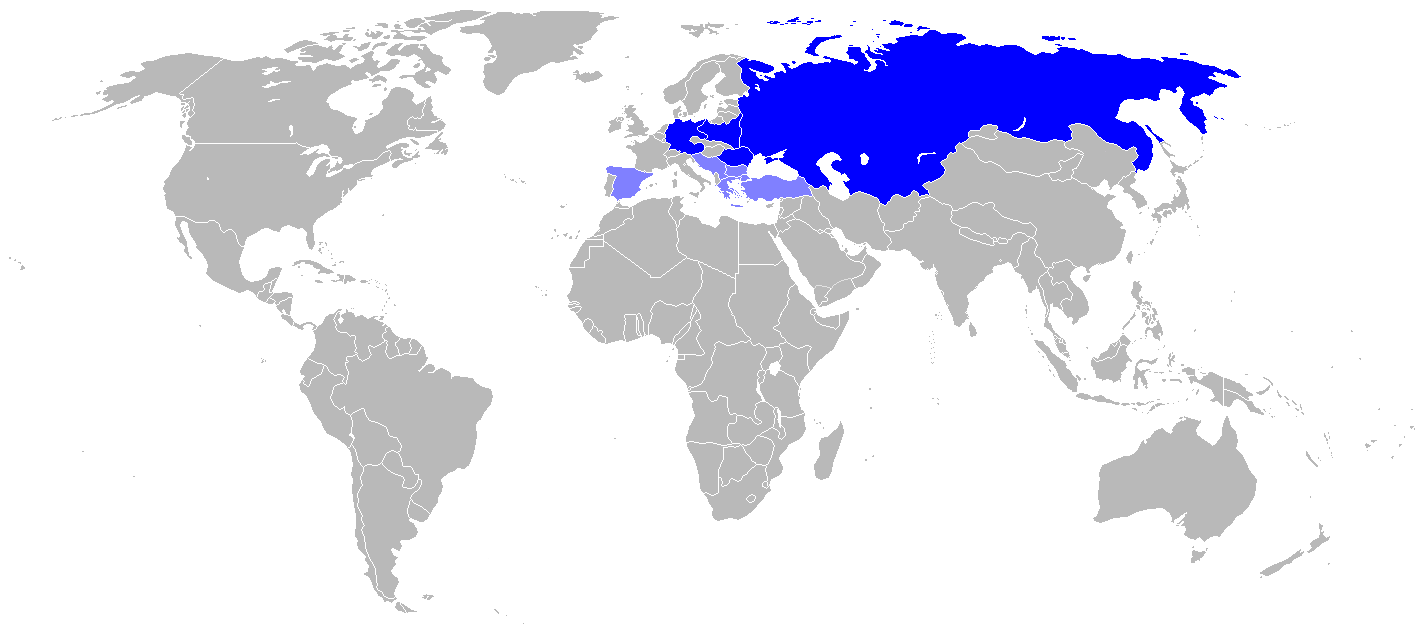
Map showing countries that used the PZL.37 (blue) and countries that ordered the plane but received no deliveries due to the outbreak of the war (light blue).

Wartime
Poland

- Polish Military Aviation
  - Brygada Bombowa
    - 10th Bomber Divizion (X Dywizjon Bombowy)
      - 211th Bomber Squadron (211. Eskadra Bombowa)
      - 212th Bomber Squadron (212. Eskadra Bombowa)
    - 15th Bomber Divizion (XV Dywizjon Bombowy)
      - 216th Bomber Squadron (216. Eskadra Bombowa)
      - 217th Bomber Squadron (217. Eskadra Bombowa)

Germany

- Luftwaffe operated two captured PZL.37s for testing purposes.

Romania

- Royal Romanian Air Force
  - 1st Bomber Flotilla (Flotila 1 Bombardament)
    - 4th Bomber Group (Grupul 4 Bombardament)
      - 76 Bomber Squadron (Escadrila 76 Bombardament)
      - 77 Bomber Squadron (Escadrila 77 Bombardament)

Soviet Union

- Soviet Air Force operated three captured PZL.37s for testing purposes.

Planned
Belgium

- Belgian Air Force – Belgium bought a licence to build an unknown number in 1938, none could be built before the fall of Belgium in 1940.

Bulgaria

- Bulgarian Air Force ordered 12 PZL.37Cs. The start of World War II did not allow them to be delivered.

Greece

- Royal Hellenic Air Force ordered 12 aircraft.

(Spain) Spanish Republic

- Spanish Republican Air Force; not delivered.

Turkey

- Turkish Air Force ordered ten PZL.37Ds, materials for the next 25 and license rights.

Kingdom of Yugoslavia

- Royal Yugoslav Air Force ordered 20 PZL.37Cs.

== Specifications (PZL.37B) ==
Data from P.Z.L. P.37 Łoś (Aircraft in Profile number 258)

General characteristics

- Crew: 4
- Length: 12.92 m (42 ft 5 in)
- Wingspan: 17.93 m (58 ft 10 in)
- Height: 5.1 m (16 ft 9 in)
- Wing area: 53.5 m^{2} (576 sq ft)
- Empty weight: 4,280 kg (9,436 lb)
- Gross weight: 8,865 kg (19,544 lb) basic combat loading
- Max takeoff weight: 9,105 kg (20,073 lb)
- Powerplant: 2 × PZL Pegaz XX 9-cylinder air-cooled radial piston engines, 723 kW (970 hp) each
- Propellers: 3-bladed variable-pitch propellers

Performance

- Maximum speed: 412 km/h (256 mph, 222 kn) 2,800 m (9,200 ft) with 1,995 kg (4,398 lb) bomb load
- Range: 2,600 km (1,600 mi, 1,400 nmi)
- Combat range: 1,000 km (620 mi, 540 nmi) with 1,760 kg (3,880 lb) bomb load and extra fuel tanks
- Service ceiling: 7,000 m (23,000 ft)
- Rate of climb: 4.7 m/s (930 ft/min)
- Wing loading: 166 kg/m^{2} (34 lb/sq ft)

Armament

- Guns: 3 × 7.92 mm lotniczy karabin maszynowy wz.37 - 1 in the nose, 1 in the rear upper station, 1 in the rear lower station
- Bombs: Up to 2,580 kg (5,690 lb) of bombs [18 × 110 kg (240 lb) + 2 × 300 kg (660 lb)]. (Note: Basic load of 20 × 110 kg (240 lb), 2,200 kg (4,900 lb). Bomb load while operating from unprepared fields was 880–1,320 kg (1,940–2,910 lb): 8, 10 or 12 × 110 kg (240 lb).)

== See also ==
Related development

- PZL.49 Miś

Aircraft of comparable role, configuration, and era

- Bloch MB.170
- Bristol Blenheim
- Dornier Do 17
- Ilyushin DB-3
- Kawasaki Ki-48
- Martin Maryland

Related lists

- List of aircraft of World War II
