= PZL.45 Sokół =

- Windtunnel mockup of the PZL.45

General information
- Type: Fighter aircraft
- National origin: Poland
- Manufacturer: PZL

The PZL.45 Sokół (falcon) was a Polish prototype fighter designed by PZL from 1936–1939. Work commenced on the aircraft in the late 1936 based on earlier light fighters.

== Design and development ==
The aircraft had a fixed undercarriage and the aircraft was powered by a Gnome-Rhône 14M05 Mars, a 14-cylinder radial engine with a maximum of 760 hp (567 kW), with a fuel tank holding 350 litres (77 imp gal; 92 US gal). Work on the aircraft was temporarily stopped but later resumed in 1938. The design was finished in 1938, and the first model was made in February 1939 with technical documentation completed in June of that year. A second prototype was designed to have retractable landing gear. It was a single-seat all-metal fighter aircraft and had a closed cockpit. The aircraft was also designed to be equipped with 4 machine guns (2 wing-mounted and 2 in the hull), though the prototype was not armed.

== Specifications ==
General characteristics

- Crew: 1 pilot
- Length: 7.88 m (25 ft 10 in)
- Wingspan: 12.14 m (39 ft 10 in)
- Height: 2.55 m (8 ft 4 in)
- Wing area: 14.3 m^{2} (154 sq ft)
- Empty weight: 1,500 kg (3,307 lb)
- Gross weight: 1,950 kg (4,299 lb)
- Fuel capacity: 350L
- Powerplant: 1 × Gnome-Rhône 14M05 Mars radial, 570 kW (760 hp)

Performance

- Maximum speed: 520 km/h (320 mph, 280 kn)
- Range: 450 km (280 mi, 240 nmi)
- Service ceiling: 8,000 m (26,000 ft)
- Rate of climb: 10 m/s (2,000 ft/min)

Armament

- 4×7.92mm caliber PWU Wz.36 machine guns
