= Ludomił Rayski =

Polish pilot, military officer

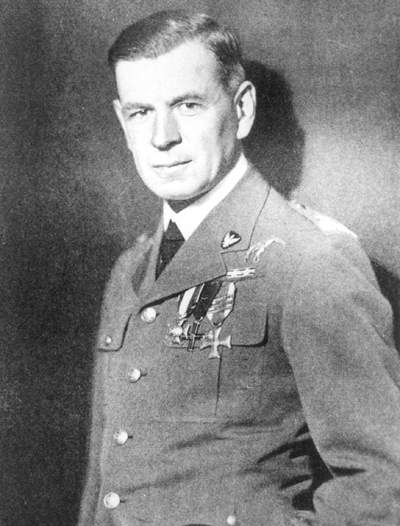
- Rayski in 1940s
- Born: 29 December 1892; Czasław near Wieliczka, Galicia, Austria-Hungary
- Died: 11 April 1977 (aged 84); London, United Kingdom
- Military career
- Service years: 1914-1949
- Rank: Generał brygady
- Nicknames: Effendi, Turek
- Units: Turkish Air Force; Polish Air Force, Royal Air Force
- Conflicts: First World War; Polish-Soviet War; Polish-Ukrainian War; Second World War; Invasion of Poland
- Other work: plotter

Ludomił Antoni Rayski (29 December 1892 – 11 April 1977) was a Polish engineer, pilot, military officer and aviator. He served as the commander of the Polish Air Force between 1926 and 1939, being responsible for modernization of Polish military aviation. Throughout his life he also served in the Austro-Hungarian Army, Polish Legions, Turkish Army, Turkish Air Force, French Air Force, French Foreign Legion and Royal Air Force. He was also known as one of the most colourful personalities of inter-war Poland - and one of its least submissive officers.

== Biography ==
=== Early life ===
Ludomił Rayski was born 29 December 1892 in Czasław near Wieliczka, to Artur Teodor Rayski of Korab Coat of Arms, an impoverished Polish noble who spent most of his life as an officer in the Ottoman Army. Artur Teodor was born a Russian citizen, but was forced into exile following the January Uprising and was accepted as an Ottoman citizen soon afterwards. Hence Ludomił retained his father's citizenship, a fact that proved vital for his later career.

Korab coat of arms

In 1902 Ludomił joined a local gymnasium in Kraków and in 1909 passed his matura exams in a college in Krosno. Soon afterwards he started his studies at the Lwów University of Technology. In 1912 he also joined the Strzelec organization. After the outbreak of the Great War he volunteered for Piłsudski's Polish Legions, where he fought under command of Gen. Józef Kordian-Zamorski. Rayski was wounded in the battle of Łowczówek. After the Ottoman Empire joined the war on the side of Austria-Hungary, he was mobilized into the Ottoman Army. Rayski initially wanted to stay in the Legions, which were commonly seen as a school of cadre of future armed forces of Poland, but was convinced by Gen. Kordian-Zamorski to go to Constantinople and try to obtain experience in air warfare.

=== The Great War ===
In 1915 Rayski was accepted into the Turkish Air Force and dispatched to the front and promoted to the rank of Observer. He served during the battle of Gallipoli, where he was seriously wounded. Upon his return from the hospital he was transferred to the Ottoman 5th Army based in Smyrna, where he was wounded for the second time. Upon return to service, on his own request he was sent to a fighter pilot training and earned his wings in the ranks of the Turkish Air Force. He served on various fronts of the war until its end. In January 1919 he was demobilized. Immediately afterwards he bought a single LVG C.V plane and flew across the Black Sea to Odessa, where he joined the Polish 4th Rifle Division under Gen. Lucjan Żeligowski. There he was made the commanding officer of that division's improvised air escadrille, equipped with 9 planes (apart from Rayski's LVG these were a single Nieuport 11C1 and eight Anatra Anasal DS). After a brief period of struggles against the Bolsheviks alongside Denikin's Whites, the unit was withdrawn to Poland.

At that time the newly reborn Polish army was badly lacking experienced pilots. Although the Polish forces managed to seize dozens of World War I planes from the defeated Central Powers, there were not enough pilots to fly them. Because of that, immediately after Rayski's arrival to Poland in June 1919, he was made the commanding officer of newly formed 10th Reconnaissance Escadrille, composed mostly of the former escadrille of the 4th Division. A skilled pilot and commander, after the escalation of the Polish-Bolshevik War and during the final stages of the Polish-Ukrainian War, in August of that year he became the commanding officer of the most famous Polish air unit of the time, the 7th Kościuszko Air Escadrille. Rayski was chosen as the commander of that unit not only for his skills as a pilot, but also for his language abilities, as the squadron was manned primarily with American volunteers. He served with that unit on the front until January 1920. Three months afterwards he was promoted to the rank of Major and given a new assignment: command of a newly formed 21st Air Escadrille. Although composed mostly of badly trained pilots and insufficiently manned, the unit proved to be one of the most successful air units of the war and during the battle of Warsaw Rayski was given command of the entire 3rd Air Squadron. He held that post until May 1921.

=== Commander of the Polish Air Force ===
After the war Rayski remained in the military. Promoted to the rank of Lt. Colonel, he briefly became the commanding officer of the Higher Pilot's School at Poznań's airfield of Ławica. However, he gave up that post in 1922 and instead returned to Lwów, where he continued his studies halted 8 years before. He also remained an active aviator and gained much fame in Poland after several of his spectacular flights. In 1925 in four days he flew the Paris-Madrid-Casablanca-Tunis-Istanbul-Warsaw trail, a remarkable achievement at that time. In August 1924 he was promoted to the rank of Colonel and sent to a course for high-ranking officers at the Higher War School of Warsaw. At the same time he collaborated with the Aviation Department of the Ministry of Military Affairs, where he became the deputy to Gen. Armand Lévéque. On 18 March 1926, shortly before the May Coup d'État, he was made the chief of the department and a de facto commander of the Polish Air Force.

At that post, Rayski became known as a supporter of the power projection doctrine and a lobbyist for development of a strong bomber force capable of both close air support and bombing raids on enemy territory. However, in the post-war period the Polish air forces were neglected as Marshal Józef Piłsudski and his predecessors underestimated the role of aeroplanes in modern warfare. Because of that, Rayski had to limit his plans to modernization of the fighter force Poland had at that time. Lack of funds, economic crisis and unwillingness to expand the air forces on the side of most of the high-ranking officers forced Rayski to focus on training of air crews instead. In that period he supported the famous Dęblin school of aviation (nicknamed the School of Eaglets in Poland) and creation of a number of permanent air bases, often with municipal rather than ministerial funds. It was Rayski to arrange the construction of a large number of new airfields and their number rose from 12 in 1923 to 39 in 1933, 11 of which were large air bases capable of supporting entire air regiments.

The lack of funds shaped Rayski's policies significantly. Because Poland could not afford to purchase a large number of modern planes abroad, Rayski promoted the development of Polish aviation industry. In 1928 on his insistence all Polish aeroplane factories switched their production to modern all-metal constructions, which allowed the new generation of young and skilled engineers to start their career. Among them were Zygmunt Puławski (designer of a family of modern fighters, starting from PZL P.1), Jerzy Dąbrowski (designer of PZL.37 Łoś bomber), Wsiewołod Jakimiuk (designer of PZL.50 Jastrząb fighter), Stanisław Prauss (author of PZL.23 Karaś and PZL.46 Sum light bombers) and Stanisław Nowkuński (designer of air engines, among them the PZL Foka). The state-owned National Aviation Works (PZL) became the primary supplier of modern aeroplanes to the Polish Army and financed much of the plane production from its own sources, primarily gathered from export of planes to Romania, Spain, Hungary, Greece and Turkey. However, the constant lack of funds allowed the Polish Air Forces only to replace the old planes with more modern ones, but not to expand it to become a fully reliable part of the armed forces. Rayski repeatedly presented state authorities with plans and petitions of significant expansion of the Air Force, but none was accepted.

In 1934 Ludomił Rayski was promoted to the rank of generał brygady, the highest rank held by any officer of the Polish Air Force at that time. Two years later, on 1 August 1936 he became the commander of the Polish Air Force. It was not until 1937 that one of his plans of modernization of the air force was finally accepted. The plan was based on extensive study of the development of the German Luftwaffe and on theories of Italian general Giulio Douhet, who envisioned that the future war would be fought primarily with bomber planes, with fighters playing a secondary role. In four years, by 1 April 1942, the number of Polish escadrilles was to be increased from 33 to 106. The plan was to be financed by the government and the entire reconstruction of the Polish Air Force was to cost approximately 1,537,000,000 złoty, that is almost 300 million US dollars or almost 62 million Pounds (by 1939 exchange rates).

The proposed shape of Polish aviation in 1942 as compared to actual composition in earlier years
	Type	1936	1939	1942 Rayski's plan
Army aviation	Reconnaissance and communication	0 escadrilles (99 Lublin R-XIII)	12 escadrilles (84 RWD-14 Czapla and Lublin R-XIII)	18 escadrilles (126 RWD-14 Czapla and LWS-3 Mewa)
Army aviation	Line planes (CAS and fighter-bombers)	17 escadrilles (170 Potez 25 and Breguet 19)		8 escadrilles (80 PZL.38 Wilk)
Army aviation	Fighters	13 escadrilles (130 PZL P.7 and PZL P.11)	10 escadrilles (74/75 PZL P.11 and PZL P.7)	18 escadrilles (180 PZL.39)
Army aviation	Bombers	3 escadrilles (18 Fokker F.VIIb/3m)		
Independent aviation	Line planes		5 escadrilles (53/54 PZL P.7a and PZL P.11c)	32 escadrilles (320 PZL.38 Wilk)
Independent aviation	Bombers		9 escadrilles (86 PZL.23B Karaś, PZL.37 Łoś and Fokker F.VII/3m)	30 escadrilles (180 PZL.37 Łoś)
Total (incl. planes in smaller units)		33 escadrilles (417 planes)	36 escadrilles (404/406 planes)	106 escadrilles (886 planes)

However, soon after the plan was passed, various conflicting groups within the general staff, as well as the financial difficulties of the newly reborn state have limited the plan. Out of 600 million złoty scheduled for the first phase of the reorganization of the Polish aviation only approximately 200 million were indeed spent, while the rest was kept by various ministries. Rayski's role was seriously undermined by lack of support within the general staff and his frequent protests and memorials made no effect. He signed his resignation twice (in March 1938 and then in January 1939), but it was not accepted. In January 1939, fearing that the war with Germany was imminent and inevitable, he resigned from his post and presented the minister of war affairs Gen. Tadeusz Kasprzycki with an ultimatum, urging him to finally mobilize the Polish air industry and dispatch all the funds. On 19 March 1939 he was dismissed from his office. Rayski's successor as the peacetime Air Force Commander became Gen. Władysław Kalkus, made personally subordinate to the Inspector of the Air Defence, Gen. Józef Zając, who was a strong supporter of the air superiority doctrine which emphasized strong fighter forces at the expense of a bomber force. The new commander of the air force cancelled most of Rayski's projects, including the successful PZL.37 Łoś bomber, whose production was to be limited from the initial number of 180 to merely 120.

Some historians, most notably Jerzy Cynk, consider Rayski as one of the most responsible persons for the poor technical state of the Polish Air Force before the war, especially lack of modern fighters. It should be however noted, that a commanding system introduced by Piłsudski after his coup d'état was faulty, because it introduced two independent branches of command: peacetime and wartime one. The chief of the Aviation Department and commander of the Air Force was only a peacetime administrative duty, subordinated to the Ministry of War, while strategic planning was to be fulfilled by the wartime branch, the General Inspectorate of the Armed Forces (GISZ), and general staff. The Inspectorate itself was not interested in military aviation much and was reluctant to work out a modern development plan for the Air Force and an appropriate strategic doctrine, giving only general directives instead. Therefore, Rayski had no knowledge on the Polish Air Force expected wartime role and as a result, he realized his own conception, without proper assessment of real needs. Only in 1936 the Air Defence Inspectorate was created, led by gen. Józef Zając, who became in conflict with Rayski. As one of mistakes is regarded support for too ambitious plan of equipping the LOT Polish Airlines with own modern airliner, the PZL.44 Wicher, what was uneconomical, and moreover, delayed development of modern fighters. In early 1930s Polish fighters of Zygmunt Puławski's design were among the best in the world, but in late 1930s the situation changed, and Rayski was reluctant to order development of successors (better versions of Pulawski's fighters, not restricted by the Polish Air Force choice of engines, were exported with a success). He promoted obsolete PZL.39 project, that was not realized, and the PZL.38 Wilk, a twin-engine heavy fighter-bomber, of a fashionable at that time class, but unable to substitute for interceptor aircraft. Future war showed, that modern single-engine interceptors were crucial aircraft for the air defence. Facing fiasco of both designs, Rayski finally ordered development of PZL.50 Jastrząb, which was hampered by his arbitrary choice of too weak engine, and appeared too late and mediocre. The other design was a low-performance light fighter PZL.45 project. Other point of criticism was that Rayski, realizing his vision of strong national aerospace industry, intentionally caused bankruptcy of Plage i Laśkiewicz factory, while the DWL hardly avoided this fate.

Until May Rayski remained without an assignment. He spent the time training on all types of Polish aeroplanes, from trainers to bombers. In July he was sent with a Polish military mission to the United Kingdom, where he was to coordinate the purchase of British planes for the Polish Air Force, as specified by the Anglo-Polish military alliance. However, the British authorities postponed the delivery of the Hawker Hurricane, Supermarine Spitfire and Fairey Battle planes and on 15 July Rayski returned to Poland with little but promises. He continued to petition the general staff for any assignment, even an assignment to a combat unit in the role of a simple pilot, but to no avail. Finally on 25 August he was made the chief of army's administration.

=== World War II ===
After the outbreak of the Polish Defensive War on 1 September, Rayski was evacuated from Warsaw along with the rest of the Commander in Chief's staff. As the army's peace-time administration ceased to exist, he was given the task of evacuation of the gold reserves of the Bank of Poland. The gold convoyed out from Warsaw later became the crucial part of the treasury of the Polish Government in Exile. However, despite his constant pleas he was not allowed to join the fights and instead, after the Soviet invasion of Poland, on 18 September he crossed the border with Romania.

Unlike most of the Polish general staff, Rayski managed to evade internment and made it to France, where he reported to Gen. Zając asking him for an assignment in the Polish Air Forces in France. His plea was yet again turned down as Rayski, along with other former high-ranking officers of the Polish Army, was made a scape-goat for the Polish defeat in the campaign. He then wrote a short memorial to all the Polish officers, in which he criticized the situation of the new commanders of the Polish Army in exile. Ordered to report to the military camp in Carisay, Rayski refused, for which he was court martialled and sentenced to 10 months in prison for insubordination. Although the sentence was never enacted, General Rayski was in fact demoted and left jobless.

Rayski then volunteered for the French Armee de L'air, but was again turned down. Officially still a General of the Polish Army, he volunteered for the Finnish Air Force to take part in the Winter War. In early 1940 he bought a transport plane and on 7 March departed for Helsinki. However, on 12 March the Moscow Peace Treaty had been signed and Rayski's service for Finland was not needed any more. Upon his return to France he was demoted to the rank of Captain and on 29 March he joined the French Foreign Legion. On 1 June the Legion sent him to French Air Forces for training, but before it could commence France surrendered to Germany and Rayski fled to Great Britain. There, on 5 September he asked both the British authorities and Gen. Władysław Sikorski to be allowed to join the Royal Air Force as a simple pilot. However, instead on 27 September he was interned in an internment camp in Rothesay on the Isle of Bute in Scotland.

On 5 November, on insistence of Air Chief Marshals Sir Cyril Newall and Charles Medhurst he was set free and in 1941 he was admitted to RAF Ferry Command units, transporting planes between allied airfields in Asia and North Africa. He led a variety of transport missions, including a remarkable flight of a formation of Bristol Blenheim bombers from Habaniya in Iraq to Singapore. After two weeks of flight, his bomber was destroyed by Japanese fighters immediately upon arrival to the attacked port.

The tide turned for him after the death of General Sikorski on 4 July 1943. The new commander of the Polish forces, Gen. Kazimierz Sosnkowski allowed Rayski to return to active service. Promoted to the British rank of Air Vice-Marshal (in Polish rank system he remained a captain), Rayski was made a delegate of the commander of the Polish Air Forces for the Middle East. At the same time Gen. Sosnkowski reviewed Rayski's court martial case and handed it to General's Court led by Admiral Jerzy Świrski. On 2 February 1944 the jury acquitted Rayski of all the charges and declared him not guilty. However, he was not promoted back to the Polish general's rank. During the Warsaw Uprising Rayski was probably the only allied General to fly combat missions on a daily basis. He volunteered for the service in No. 318 Polish Fighter-Reconnaissance Squadron and No. 301 Polish Bomber Squadron stationed in Brindisi, and flown a number of supply missions for the Armia Krajowa fighting in German-occupied Europe, both on Supermarine Spitfire and on B-24 Liberator. Altogether, during his entire service with the RAF, he flew a total of 1519 hours of combat missions.

=== After the war ===
After the war, Rayski remained in the Polish Army and then the Polish Liquidation Unit until 8 February 1949, when he was demobilized. He remained in the United Kingdom and settled in London's borough of Ealing, where he started to work as a plotter. He also remained an active member of the local Polish community and the honorary chief of the Polish Airmen Society. In 1966 he married his second wife, Eileen Sheedy. In early April 1977, Rayski - then already heavily sick and dying - was finally acquitted of all the charged presented to him in 1940 by an honorary commission of the Polish Government in Exile led by Gen. Zygmunt Szyszko-Bohusz. Ludomił Rayski died 11 April and was buried with his first wife, Stanisława Kuszelewska-Rayska, in Newark. In May 1993 his ashes were buried with military honours in the Polish Army's Cathedral in Warsaw.

== Awards and decorations ==
- Badge for wounds and injuries (three wounds)
- Silver Cross of the Virtuti Militari
- Order of the Medjidie
- Commander's Cross with Star of the Order of Polonia Restituta (1993); also awarded the Officer's Cross
- Cross of Independence
- Cross of Valour (four times)
- Gold Cross of Merit (twice)
- Warsaw Uprising Cross
- Order of the Cross of the Eagle, Class II (Estonia, 1932)
- Officer of the Legion of Honour (France)
- Distinguished Service Order (United Kingdom)
- Air Force Cross (United Kingdom)
- Africa Star (United Kingdom)
- 1939-1945 Star (United Kingdom)
- Italy Star (United Kingdom)
- Gallipoli Star (Ottoman Empire) with bars for Gallipoli campaign
- Field Pilot Badge

== Notes and references ==
In-line:

General:
