= PZL.55 =

Polish project of fighter aircraft

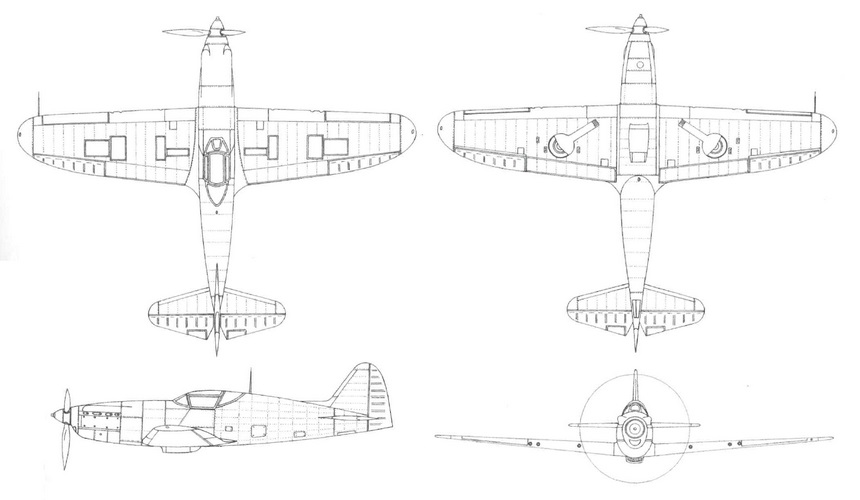
- Schematic drawings of the PZL.55

General information
- Type: Fighter aircraft
- National origin: Poland
- Manufacturer: Państwowe Zakłady Lotnicze
- Designer: Jerzy Dąbrowski
- Status: Project
- Primary user: Polish Air Force (planned)

PZL.55 was a Polish pre-war project of a fighter aircraft, created at Państwowe Zakłady Lotnicze by Jerzy Dąbrowski. The design was for a single-seat low-wing all-metal monoplane. It was planned that the plane would replace obsolete fighters and lead to a significant increase in the capabilities of Polish Military Aviation.

== Design and development ==
At the end of the 1930s, Polish Military Aviation urgently needed a modern high-performance fighter with strong armament that could put up an equal fight against the latest and future German and Soviet designs. Due to the unsatisfactory performance of the new PZL.50 Jastrząb fighter and a change in the concept of its use, the Aviation Command of the Ministry of Military Affairs commissioned the PZL to develop a fighter intended for maneuver combat with other fighters, a type of air combat called dogfight. The new aircraft was to prioritize speed and maneuverability with less importance for range and rate of climb. In the summer of 1939, the PZL.55 was chosen over the PZL.53 and PZL.56 designs, which were themselves developments of the PZL.50, and completed a series of tests in the wind tunnel giving promising results. The Aviation Command showed great interest in the project and in August 1939, the design and model of the fighter were approved and two prototypes were ordered. Due to the German-Soviet invasion in September 1939, the implementation of the PZL.55 project was stopped shortly after it had started.

The project was developed using experience with the PZL.26 sports plane and a private sports plane built by Dąbrowski for his own use. It was intended to use several very modern solutions for the Polish conditions at that time. The fighter was to have a fully retractable landing gear with air-oil shock absorbers, and powerful armament consisting of 6-8 machine guns was to be placed in the wings. The rest of the internal wing structure was to be taken up by integral fuel tanks. To increase maneuverability the wings were also equipped with flaps and automatic Handley Page slats. The wing armament was to be complemented by an autocannon firing through the propeller shaft. A retractable engine coolant radiator was placed under the fuselage, but it is possible that this rather problematic solution would be abandoned in later stages of development. The pilot's cabin was fully adapted to night flights and had heating, air conditioning and instruments for piloting without ground visibility. The plane was to be equipped with a modern radio station, an oxygen installation and armored pilot's seat. The windshield was also made of thick armored glass. Some of these solutions have already been used in PZL P.24 and PZL.50.

The first prototype PZL.55/I was designed for the Hispano-Suiza 12Y49 inline engine but the final production version was to be powered by the more powerful, license-built Hispano-Suiza 12Z series engines which were still in development at the time. In 1939, Hispano-Suiza provided the PZL with information that the 12Z engines were to ultimately achieve a maximum power of 1,400-1,600 hp. The approved design assumed that such power would translate into a maximum speed of 650-700 km/h, which was an unprecedented speed at that time. Ultimately, the surrender of France during World War II halted development of the 12Z engines and full-scale production did not begin until the end of the war. The Allison V-1710-23 engine was also considered, which, however, was not very realistic because deliveries from the USA would be logistically difficult and the Americans were reluctant to license the production of aircraft engines to other countries.

== Planned specifications (PZL.55) ==
Data from

General characteristics

- Length: 9.6 m (31 ft 6 in)
- Wingspan: 11.25 m (36 ft 11 in)
- Height: 2.7 m (8 ft 10 in)
- Wing area: 22.5 m^{2} (242 sq ft)
- Empty weight: 2,300 kg (5,071 lb)
- Gross weight: 3,250 kg (7,165 lb)
- Powerplant: 1 × Hispano-Suiza 12Z V-12 liquid-cooled piston engine, 1,200 kW (1,600 hp)

Performance

- Maximum speed: 660 km/h (410 mph, 360 kn)
- Range: 800 km (500 mi, 430 nmi)

Armament

- Guns: 1 x Hispano-Suiza HS.404 20 mm (0.787 in) cannon, 6-8 x 7.92 mm (0.312 in) PWU wz.36 machine guns

== See also ==
Related development

- PZL.26
