= PZL.56 Kania =

General information
- Type: Fighter aircraft
- National origin: Poland
- Manufacturer: Państwowe Zakłady Lotnicze
- Designer: Wsiewołod Jakimiuk
- Status: Project
- Primary user: Polish Air Force (planned)

History
- Developed from: PZL.50 Jastrząb

PZL.56 Kania (buzzard) was a Polish pre-war project of a fighter aircraft designed by Wsiewołod Jakimiuk of the Państwowe Zakłady Lotnicze. A single-seat low-wing monoplane was a development of PZL.50 Jastrząb fighter, modified to house a Hispano-Suiza 12Y French inline engine.

While PZL.50 Jastrząb's prototype proved to be an excellent fighter, it was seriously underpowered as modern engines of sufficient power were still unavailable at the time of its construction. Its PZL Merkury VIII engine (a license-built copy of Bristol Mercury VIIIA) had only 725 horsepower (541 kW), with emergency power reaching 840 horsepower (630 kW). At the same time the engineers at the French Hispano-Suiza company announced, that their line of engines marketed as Hispano-Suiza 12Y would reach 1,100 horsepower (820 kW) of power in two to three years. Such engines would be sufficient to power the PZL.50, or any other similar fighter design considered by the Polish construction bureaus at the time. To prepare for the arrival of new engines, the PZL works organised an internal competition for a redesign of PZL.50 from a large radial engine to a smaller, more streamlined inline engine. Poland also wanted to buy a license for even stronger engines of the new Hispano-Suiza 12Z series that would ultimately replace the 12Y series.

The contest was won in August 1939 by Wsiewołod Jakimiuk. The resulting design was an all-metal, low-wing fighter aircraft, with retractable landing gear and tail wheel. The plane was to be armed with a single 20mm gun firing through the propeller shaft and four 7.9 mm machine guns in the wings. Possibly the design would also allow for up to 500 kilograms (1,100 lb) of bombs to be carried under the wings or the fuselage. The projected speed was to exceed 500 kilometres per hour (310 mph). Project prepared in August 1939 was rejected in favour of PZL.55 designed by Jerzy Dąbrowski.

Jakimiuk was also responsible for development work on the PZL P.11 fighter that formed the core of Polish fighter aviation on the onset of World War II, and after the war was a member of the de Havilland Canada team that designed the successful Beaver and Chipmunk bush planes.

== Planned specifications (PZL.56 Kania) ==
=== General characteristics ===
- Crew: 1
- Powerplant: 1× Hispano-Suiza 12Y inline engine, 1100 hp

=== Performance ===
- Maximum speed: 760 km/h

== See also ==
Related development

- PZL.50 Jastrząb
- PZL.53 Jastrząb II
