= PZL-102 Kos =

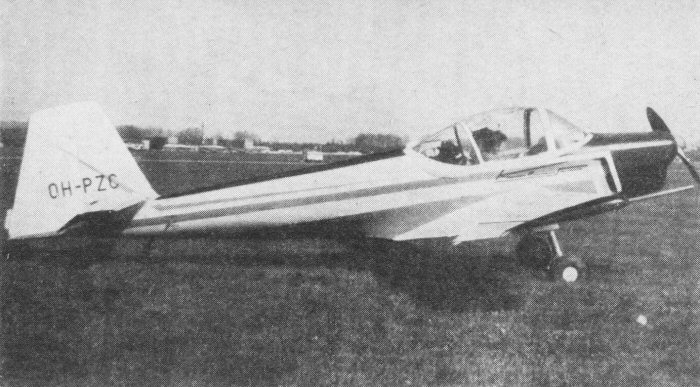

General information
- Type: Two-seat touring/training monoplane
- Manufacturer: PZL
- Number built: 10

History
- Manufactured: 1959-1962
- Introduction date: 1959
- First flight: 23 May 1958

The PZL-102 Kos (blackbird) is a Polish two-seat touring and training monoplane designed and built by PZL.

== Development ==
First flown on 21 May 1958 by Mieczysław Miłosz the PZL-102 was designed as a semi-aerobatic two-seat light monoplane and was later given the name Kos. The Kos was an all-metal low-wing cantilever monoplane with fabric tail control surfaces. It had a fixed tailwheel landing gear and the prototype had a nose-mounted 65 hp (48 kW) Narkiewicz WN-1 flat-four engine. The Kos had an enclosed cockpit for two side-by-side. After a number of prototypes the production aircraft (designated PZL-102B) first flew in October 1959, with Continental C90 engine and changed wing construction. Only short series was produced, because it needed imported engine.

== Operational history ==
Between 13 May and 8 June 1960 Antoni Szymański made 9000 km commercial flight on PZL-102B on route Warsaw - Vienna - Geneva - Reims - London - Luxembourg - Berlin - Warsaw.

Seven aircraft were sold abroad. Austrian aircraft were operated for agrospraying purposes. Tank filled with chemical agent was placed on the passenger seat.

One PZL-102 has been restored to airworthy condition (markings SP-EFA).

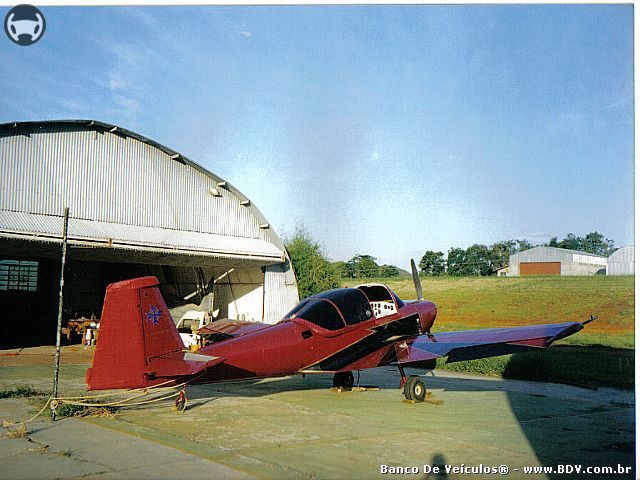
PZL 102B restored on Brazil, currently on sale.

== Variants ==
PZL-102A
Prototypes
PZL-102B
Production variant with Continental C90 engine.

There is another PZL 102B restored in South Africa, based at Jack Taylor Airfield Krugersdorp, and one more in Brazil (PT-BGP)

== Operators ==
- Austria
- Brazil
- Finland
- Lebanon
- Poland
- South Africa

== Specifications (PZL-102B) ==
Data from Jane's All the World's Aircraft 1962-63, The Illustrated Encyclopedia of Aircraft

General characteristics

- Crew: 2
- Length: 6.97 m (22 ft 10 in)
- Wingspan: 8.49 m (27 ft 10 in)
- Height: 1.88 m (6 ft 2 in)
- Wing area: 11.02 m^{2} (118.6 sq ft)
- Airfoil: NACA 43012A
- Empty weight: 418 kg (922 lb)
- Max takeoff weight: 630 kg (1,389 lb)
- Fuel capacity: 75 L (19.8 US gal; 16.5 imp gal)
- Powerplant: 1 × Continental C90-12F 4-cylinder air-cooled horizontally-opposed piston engine, 71 kW (95 hp)
- Propellers: 2-bladed fixed-pitch wooden propeller, 1.8 m (5 ft 11 in) diameter

Performance

- Maximum speed: 193 km/h (120 mph, 104 kn)
- Cruise speed: 174 km/h (108 mph, 94 kn)
- Stall speed: 69 km/h (43 mph, 37 kn) with flaps down
- Never exceed speed: 300 km/h (190 mph, 160 kn)
- Range: 640 km (400 mi, 350 nmi) at 135 km/h (84 mph; 73 kn)
- Service ceiling: 3,800 m (12,500 ft)
- Rate of climb: 3.5 m/s (690 ft/min)
- Wing loading: 57.2 kg/m^{2} (11.7 lb/sq ft)
- Power/mass: 0.1126 kW/kg (0.0685 hp/lb)
