= PZL.43 =

Polish light bomber of WW2

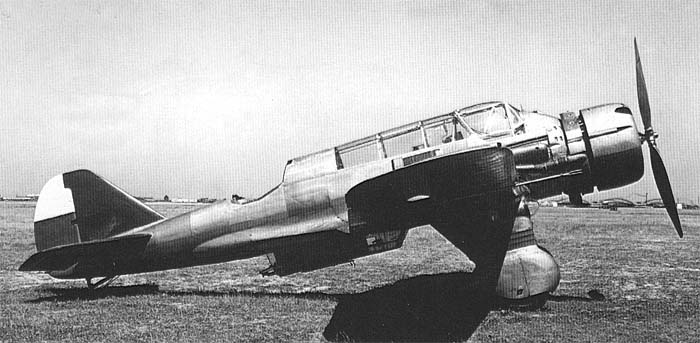

General information
- Type: Light bomber and reconnaissance aircraft
- Manufacturer: Państwowe Zakłady Lotnicze
- Primary users: Bulgarian Air Force Polish Air Force
- Number built: 54

History
- Manufactured: 1937 – 1939
- Introduction date: 1937
- First flight: February 1937
- Retired: 1946 (Bulgaria)
- Developed from: PZL.23 Karaś

The PZL.43 was a Polish light bomber and reconnaissance aircraft designed in the mid-1930s by PZL in Warsaw. It was a development of the PZL.23 Karaś. Its main user was the Bulgarian Airforce who called it the Chaika (Чайка, gull).

== Design and development ==
The standard Polish light bomber and reconnaissance aircraft, the PZL.23 Karaś could not be exported because of licence restrictions on the use of the Polish-built (PZL) Bristol Pegasus engine. The PZL.43 was a development of the PZL.23, powered instead by a Gnome-Rhône 14K engine. It was first offered to Romania, but they rejected it in favour of domestic designs. The PZL was more successful in Bulgaria, then reforming their airforce after a period of post-World War I treaty constraints. An order for 12 aircraft was placed in April 1936.

Like its predecessor, the PZL.43 was conventional in layout, a low-wing, all-metal, metal-covered cantilever monoplane. The fuselage was semi-monocoque. It had a crew of three: pilot, bombardier and an observer/rear gunner. The pilot and observer's cockpits were in tandem and glazed with the open rear gunner's position behind. The bombardier occupied a ventral combat gondola which had a machine gun position at the rear. The fixed undercarriage was heavily spatted, though not suited for rough airfields. Tanks in the centre section of the wings held 740 litres of fuel. A three-bladed propeller was used.

The differences between the two types derived chiefly from use of the heavier and longer (two rows of seven cylinders) Gnome-Rhône engine. To maintain the centre of gravity the fuselage was lengthened by adding one central section which moved the bombardier's gondola rearwards. The new engine improved performance considerably, for example increasing maximum speed from 319 km/h to 365 km/h. In addition, armament was increased with two forward firing wz. 36 machine guns mounted in offset fairings to clear the radial engine. Up to 700 kg of bombs could be carried under the wings, like the PZL.23. A common option was 24 x 12.5 kg bombs (300 kg in total). A camera was fitted for reconnaissance.

No prototype preceded the production series of 12 aircraft completed in 1937. These were designated PZL.43 and powered by Gnome-Rhône 14Kirs engines of 900 to 930 hp (671 to 694 kW).

In March 1938, Bulgaria ordered a further 42 aircraft powered by the new Gnome-Rhône 14N-01 engine, an improved 14K design that delivered 950 to 1,020 hp (708 to 761 kW). These were designated PZL.43A. Production started in 1939, but only 36 were completed and delivered to Bulgaria before the German Invasion of Poland in September 1939.

Sometimes the aircraft is called the "PZL P.43", but despite an abbreviation P.43 painted on the tail fin, the letter "P" was used mainly for fighter designs (like the PZL P.11). In some older sources the PZL.43 is referred to as the PZL.43A, and the PZL.43A as the PZL.43B. These latter designations are incorrect.

== Operational history ==
After the German invasion of Czechoslovakia in March 1939, in an increasingly tense political situation, the Polish Air Force proposed to requisition from the Bulgarian order of PZL.43As. A short-sighted decision by the military authorities, afraid of penalties, was to fulfill the order (the penalties would have been less than the worth of two aircraft - about 440,000 zlotys). The first PZL.43As were delivered to Bulgaria in June 1939, the last of 36 in August, just before World War II began. Along with 12 PZL.43s and two PZL.43As delivered by Germany in 1940, these gave Bulgaria a total of 50 aircraft.

They initially served in three 12-aircraft squadrons of the 1st Line Group (linyen orlyak). From 1942 they were used in the 1st Reconnaissance Regiment and 2nd Line Regiment. Chaikas were used mostly for training and searching for partisans in Macedonia in 1943–44. Several of them crashed during service and there were difficulties in obtaining spare parts. In 1944 they were withdrawn from combat service and were eventually written off in 1946.

At the time of the German invasion of Poland, nine PLZ.43As of the Bulgarian order were crated ready for delivery or were incomplete, two lacking propellers. Five were moved to the airfield at Bielany and taken over by the Polish Air Force for use by 41 Eskadra Rozpoznawcza (41st Reconnaissance Squadron) which was mostly equipped with PZL.23 Karaś. They undertook reconnaissance duties but by 10 September 1939, there were the only two aircraft remaining. One was shot down by a Messerschmitt Bf 110 at Michałówek near Sulejówek and the crew killed. The second, damaged by a pair of Messerschmitt Bf 109s, two days later, crash landed in Brześć. Both probably still carried Bulgarian markings.

Another three complete aircraft from the Bulgarian order were left at Okęcie and these were damaged during an air raid on 4 September and later captured by the Germans in a factory in Warszawa-Okęcie. Some damaged aircraft left at Okęcie airfield were captured by the Germans. Five were repaired and delivered to Bulgaria. Another was tested by the Germans in Rechlin in 1940 before joining the others in Bulgaria in October.

== Variants ==
PZL.43
First production series, 12 built.
PZL.43A
Second production series with more powerful Gnome-Rhône 14N-01 engine, 42 built.
PZL.43B
Improved version, powered by a 980 hp (731 kW) Gnome-Rhône 14N-01 engine.

== Operators ==
Bulgaria

- Bulgarian Air Force operated 50 aircraft
  - 2. jato/ Obrazcow Orliak (2. Squadron of the Exemplary Wing) operated 12 PZL.43
  - 1. Lineen Orliak (Level-flight (bomber) Squadron) operated 36 PZL.43A, 12 in each jato (Squadron)
  - 1. Razuznawatelen Polk (Reconnaissance Regiment) operated PZL.43A between March 1942 and August 1944
  - 2. Lineen Polk (Level-flight (bomber) Regiment) operated PZL.43A between March 1942 and August 1944
  - 113. jato za blisko razuznavanye (Close Distance Reconnaissance Squadron) operated 13 PZL.43A between August 1944 and early 1945
  - 123. jato za blisko razuznavanye operated 11 PZL.43A between August 1944 and early 1945

Nazi Germany

- Luftwaffe tested captured aircraft.

Poland

- Polish Air Force
  - 41 Eskadra Rozpoznawcza (Reconnaissance Squadron) operated five PZL.43A aircraft

== Specifications (PZL.43B) ==
Data from Polish Aircraft 1893–1939

General characteristics

- Crew: 3
- Length: 9.95 m (32 ft 8 in)
- Wingspan: 13.95 m (45 ft 9 in)
- Height: 3.3 m (10 ft 10 in)
- Wing area: 26.8 m^{2} (288 sq ft)
- Empty weight: 2,200 kg (4,850 lb)
- Gross weight: 3,100 kg (6,834 lb) to 3,300 kg (7,300 lb) (reconnaissance missions)
- Max takeoff weight: 3,525 kg (7,771 lb) (bombing missions)
- Fuel capacity: 740 L (200 US gal; 160 imp gal) in six wing tanks with a 30 L (7.9 US gal; 6.6 imp gal) collector tank in the fuselage and a 70 L (18 US gal; 15 imp gal) oil tank forward of the cockpit.
- Powerplant: 1 × Gnome-Rhône 14N-01 14-cylinder air-cooled two-row radial piston engine, 720 kW (970 hp)
- Propellers: 3-bladed Gnome-Rhône adjustable-pitch metal propeller

Performance

- Maximum speed: 365 km/h (227 mph, 197 kn) at 4,000 m (13,000 ft) (lightly loaded)

300 km/h (190 mph; 160 kn) at sea level

- Range: 1,400 km (870 mi, 760 nmi)
- Service ceiling: 8,500 m (27,900 ft)
- Time to altitude: 4,000 m (13,000 ft) in 12 minutes

Armament

- Guns: 2x 7.7 mm (0.303 in) KM Wz.36 machine-guns in the fuselage sides

Single flexibly mounted 7.7 mm (0.303 in) Vickers Type F machine-guns in aft facing dorsal and ventral positions

- Bombs: up to 700 kg (1,500 lb) of bombs on external racks under the wings

Avionics
RH-32 bomb-sight

== See also ==
Related development

- PZL.23 Karaś

Aircraft of comparable role, configuration, and era

- Neman R-10
- Heinkel He 70
- Fairey Battle
- A-35 Vengeance
- Mitsubishi Ki-30
- DAR-10
