= PZL M-3 Pliszka =

Polish Glider, 1959

M-3 Pliszka
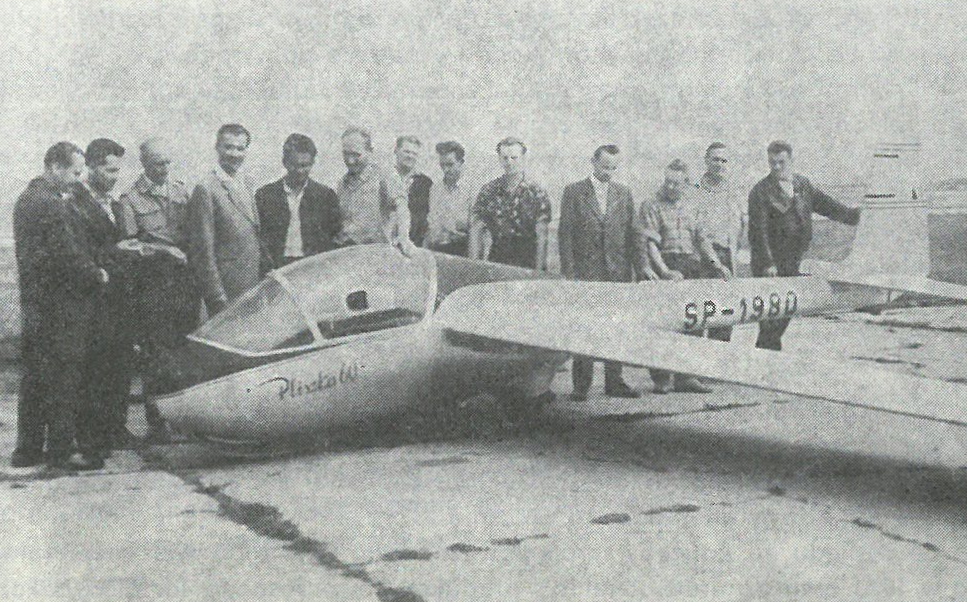

General information
- Type: Glider
- National origin: Poland
- Manufacturer: Originally named WSK then PZL
- Designer: Zdzisław Żoka
- Number built: 3

History
- First flight: 20 March 1959

The PZL M-3 Pliszka (Wagtail) was the first all-metal Polish glider. Three were built but its performance, particularly its glide ratio, was not good enough for it to be produced for Polish clubs.

== Design and development ==
The M-3 Pliszka was the first Polish all-metal glider. It was also the first design from a young team led by Zdzisław Żoka in the WSK factory at Mielec, hence the M in the designation. Before the glider had been completed the factory was reorganized and regained its pre-war name of PZL. Though the design was largely finished by early 1957, construction was delayed and the first flight was not made until 20 March 1959. The pilot was S. Makaruk.

The Pliszka had a two-part mid-wing of trapezoidal plan, with most sweep on the trailing edge, mounted with 3.5° of dihedral. Each half-wing was built around a single spar with a diagonal drag strut near the root from spar to fuselage. Forward of the spar the wing was metal stress-skinned, forming a torsion-resistant D-box, with fabric covering aft. Slotted, divided, balanced ailerons filled about half the span, with spoilers mounted on the rear of the spar a little inboard of them.

The M-3 Pliszka's metal skinned fuselage was built in two parts. The forward section, including the cockpit with its high-domed, two-piece transparency in front of the wing and the wing mounting, was a semi-monocoque, elliptical section, stressed skin structure. A short rearward conical extension joined it to a circular section, monocoque tail boom and a conventional tail, with a narrow, straight-tapered fin and cantilever tailplane, the latter mounted on top of the fuselage well forward of the rudder hinge. The elevators were also narrow and straight-tapered. The control surfaces of the M-3 were entirely metal-covered.

The Pliszka landed on a rubber cord sprung monowheel positioned aft of the spar, a short nose skid and a small, rubber sprung tail bumper. The monowheel had a brake interconnected with the spoilers.

Two M-3 flight prototypes, together with a third airframe for static stress testing, were built. The first flight prototype flew on 20 March 1958. Its flight tests were encouraging, with performance figures better than predicted, so a second prototype with minor improvements was built. Its wing tips were altered and the spoilers limited to opening above the wing, There were also cockpit changes, partly to improve the pilot's view. It first flew on 5 March 1960.

The last Pliszka, designated M-3A, was a version strengthened for aerobatics. Structural changes included metal skinning over all the first 700 mm (28 in) of each wing root and reinforcement of the rear fuselage. Control surfaces were also modified: the ailerons gained a third mounting point and the structure and profile of the rudder were altered, giving it a more pointed tip and a rounded underside. The rudder was partly fabric-covered, the elevators wholly so. The aerodynamic balances of the tail surfaces was increased and the ailerons mass-balanced.

== Operational history ==
The first prototype was exhibited at shows in Poznań and Warsaw in 1960, and at Łódź in 1961. That year the Pliszka 60 was certified and in 1963 it joined the PZL factory's aeroclub at Mielec. Certification testing of the M-3A was ended when it became clear that it could not achieve the glide ratios of over 1:27 sought by the Polish gliding clubs.

== Variants ==
M-3 Pliszka
First prototype, first flown 20 March 1959.
M-3 Pliszka 60
Second prototype, flown 5 March 1960.
M-3A Pliszka bis
Aerobatic version, flown 19 May 1961. Small (120 mm (4.7 in)) span increase, strengthened wing roots and all control surfaces balanced, with fabric-covered rear control surfaces.

== Specifications (PZL M-3A Pliszka bis) ==
Data from Samolotypolskie

General characteristics

- Length: 6.74 m (22 ft 1 in)
- Wingspan: 14.32 m (47 ft 0 in)
- Height: 2.14 m (7 ft 0 in)
- Wing area: 15 m^{2} (160 sq ft)
- Aspect ratio: 13.7
- Airfoil: NACA 43012A
- Empty weight: 251 kg (553 lb)
- Gross weight: 341 kg (752 lb)

Performance

- Maximum speed: 300 km/h (190 mph, 160 kn)
- Stall speed: 54 km/h (34 mph, 29 kn) minimum speed
- Maximum glide ratio: 23.4 at 81 km/h (50 mph; 44 kn)
- Rate of sink: 0.9 m/s (180 ft/min) at 67 km/h (42 mph; 36 kn)
