= Karabin lotniczy wz. 36 =

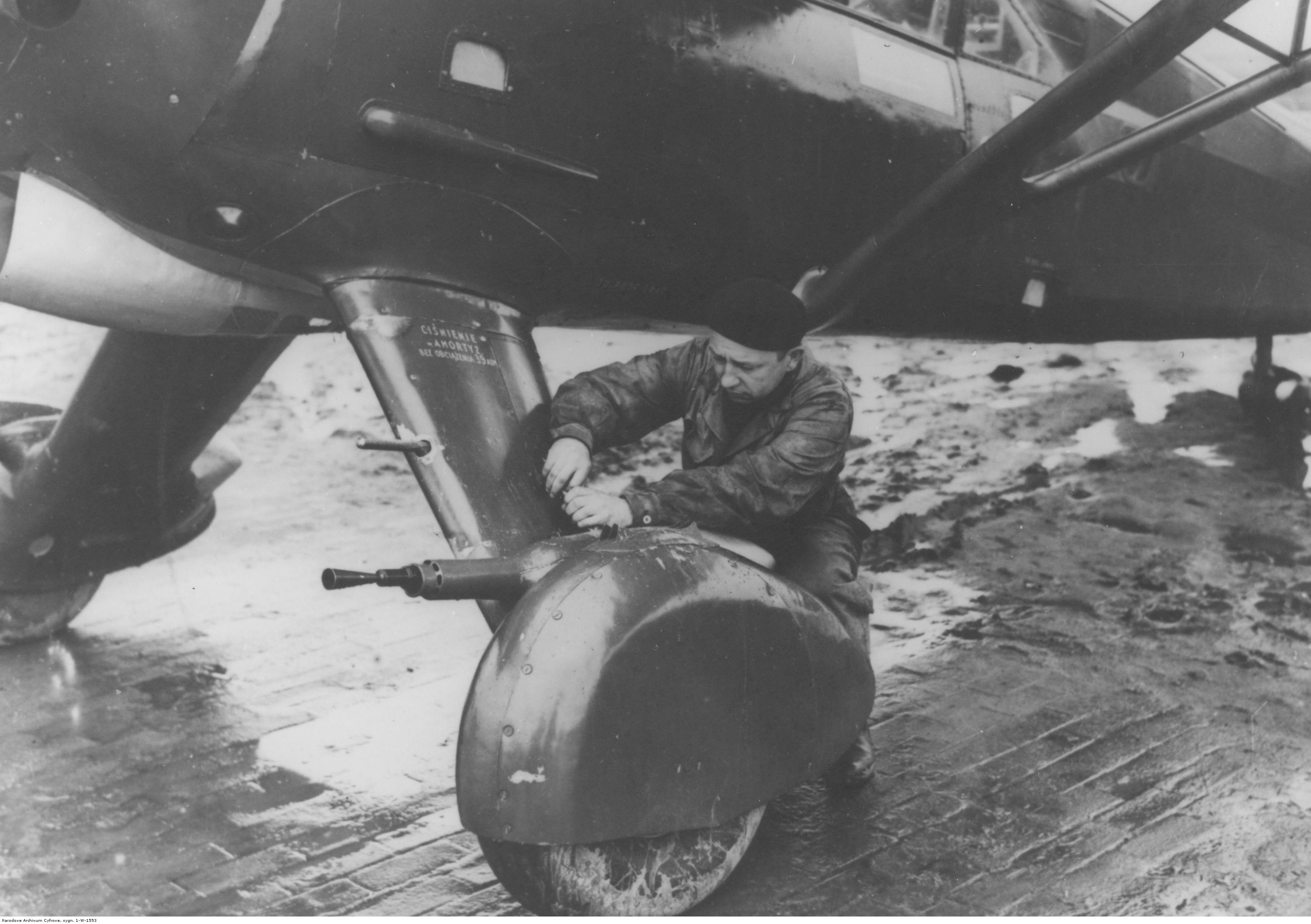
A wz. 36 machine gun in the LWS-3 undergoing maintenance.

Karabin lotniczy uniwersalny wz. 36 (English: universal aviation rifle pattern 1936) is a Polish 7.92 mm calibre aerial machine gun of late 1930s. It was a development of karabin lotniczy wz. 33, itself a modification of the successful ckm wz. 30 multi-purpose heavy machine gun.

The major differences between wz. 33 and wz. 36 included redesigned feeding mechanisms allowing for the weapon to be fed from both sides (and coupled on double mountings). It was fed by belt magazines of 100 bullets each.

Intended to become the main type of aerial machine gun in Polish service both as fixed wing- or nose-mounted and as turret-mounted weapon, due to the introduction of lekki karabin lotniczy wz. 37 it was to serve only in fixed mountings in such planes as LWS-3 Mewa, PZL.46 Sum, PZL.50 Jastrząb, PZL.54 Ryś and PZL.55. Nevertheless, a man-operated mounting was also developed and was used in PZL.43 and PZL.43A light bombers used by Bulgarian Air Force.

== See also ==
- Państwowa Fabryka Karabinów
