= PZL.53 Jastrząb II =

1939 Polish fighter aircraft project

General information
- Type: Fighter aircraft
- National origin: Poland
- Manufacturer: Państwowe Zakłady Lotnicze
- Status: Project
- Primary user: Polish Air Force (planned)

History
- Developed from: PZL.50 Jastrząb

PZL.53 Jastrząb II (Hawk II) was a project of Polish pre-war fighter aircraft developed from PZL.50 Jastrząb and designed by Wsiewołod Jakimiuk of the PZL works. A single-seat low-wing monoplane was to serve as a multi-purpose fighter and escort and reinforcement for PZL.50 Jastrząb in the Polish Air Force.

Initial design was prepared in 1939 and was based on PZL.50 Jastrząb but aircraft had greater bomb load (300 kg compared to 100 kg in PZL.50) and two additional 20 mm guns. Aircraft was designed for much stronger 1200-1300 hp engine chosen from PZL Bristol Herkules III, PZL Waran, Pratt-Whitney or Gnome-Rhône 14R4 engines.

== Versions ==
PZL.53A
First production variant powered by a 890–970 kW (1,200–1,300 hp) engine.
PZL.53B
Development of the PZL.50B powered by Gnome-Rhône 14R-4 engine.

== Operators (planned) ==
Poland

- Polish Air Force

== Specifications (PZL.53) ==
Data from

General characteristics

- Powerplant: 1 × PZL Bristol Hercules III 9-cyl. air-cooled radial piston engine, 970 kW (1,300 hp)

Performance

- Maximum speed: 560 km/h (350 mph, 300 kn)

Armament

- Guns: 2 x 20 mm (0.787 in) Nkm wz.38 FKD cannon, 4 x 7.92 mm (0.312 in) PWU wz. 36 machine guns
- Bombs: 1 x 300 kg (660 lb)

== See also ==
Related development

- PZL.50 Jastrząb
- PZL.56 Kania
