= Państwowe Zakłady Lotnicze =

Polish aerospace manufacturer

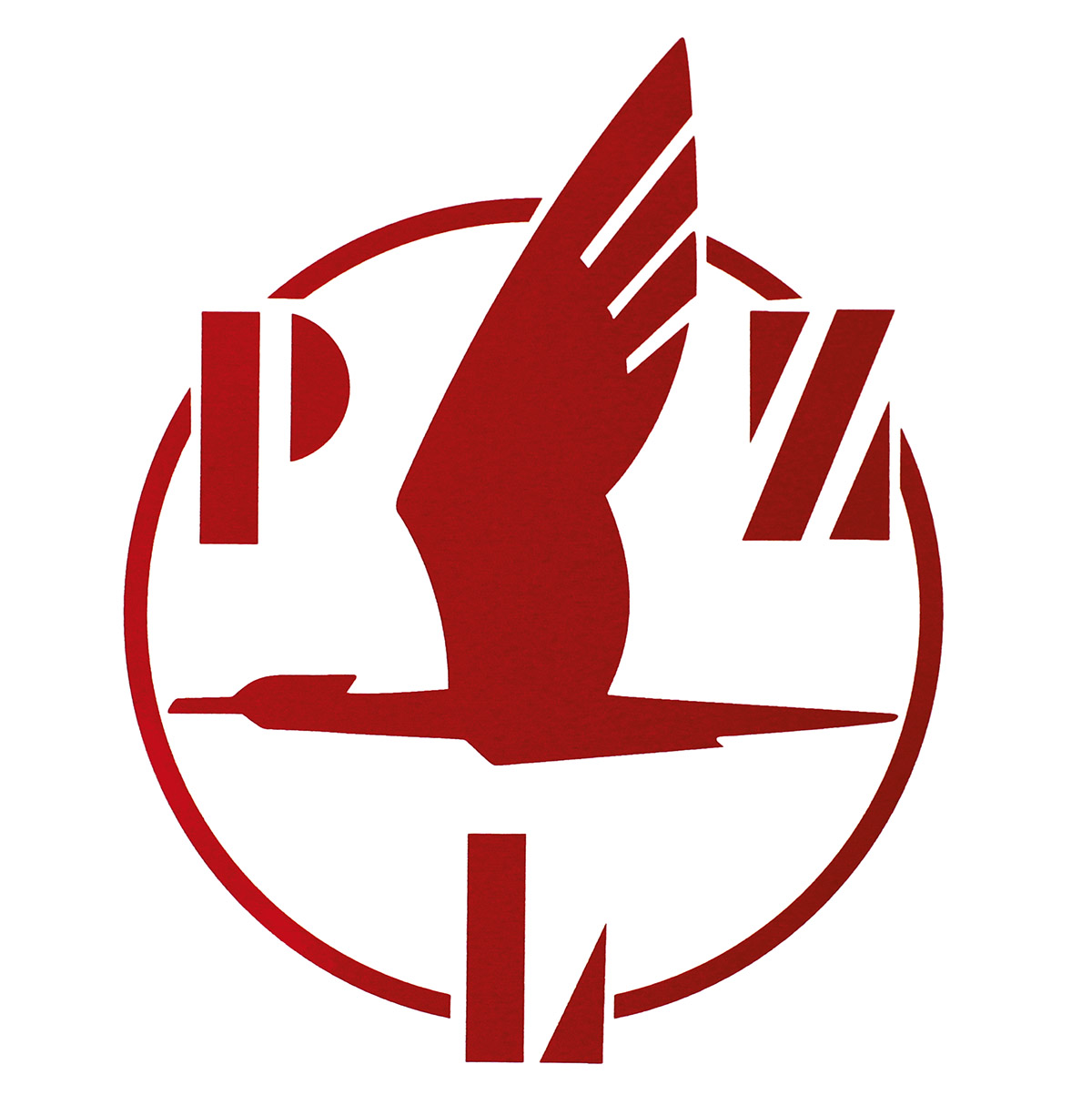
- Industry: Aerospace
- Predecessor: Centralne Warsztaty Lotnicze
- Founded: 1928
- Defunct: 1939
- Fate: ceased to exist due to the war
- Successors: PZL Warszawa-Okęcie; PZL Mielec; PZL Świdnik; PZL Bielsko; Allstar PZL Glider; WSK Rzeszów; WSK "PZL Kalisz"; WSK "PZL Warszawa II"
- Headquarters: Okęcie, Warsaw, Poland
- Key people: Jerzy Dąbrowski; Wsiewołod Jakimiuk; Mieczysław Miłosz; Stanisław Prauss; Zygmunt Puławski; Tadeusz Sołtyk; Wiesław Stępniewski
- Subsidiaries: Podlaska Wytwórnia Samolotów (1937–1939)

PZL (Państwowe Zakłady Lotnicze - State Aviation Works) was the largest Polish aerospace manufacturer of the interwar period, and a brand of their aircraft. Based in Warsaw between 1928 and 1939, PZL introduced a variety of well-regarded aircraft, most notably the PZL P.11 fighter, the PZL.23 Karaś light bomber, and the PZL.37 Łoś medium bomber.

In the post-war era, aerospace factories in Poland were initially run under the name WSK (Transport Equipment Manufacturing Plant), but returned to adopt PZL acronym in late 1950s. This was used as a common aircraft brand and later as a part of names of several Polish state-owned aerospace manufacturers referring to PZL traditions, and belonging to the Zjednoczenie Przemysłu Lotniczego i Silnikowego PZL - PZL Aircraft and Engine Industry Union. Among the better-known products during this period is the PZL TS-11 Iskra jet trainer and PZL-104 Wilga STOL utility aircraft.

After the fall of communism in Poland in 1989, these manufacturers became separate companies, still sharing the PZL name. In the case of PZL Mielec, the abbreviation was later developed as Polskie Zakłady Lotnicze - Polish Aviation Works. Over time, the now-separate divisions were purchased by foreign concerns but many continue to use the PZL brand.

== History ==
=== PZL (1928–1939) ===
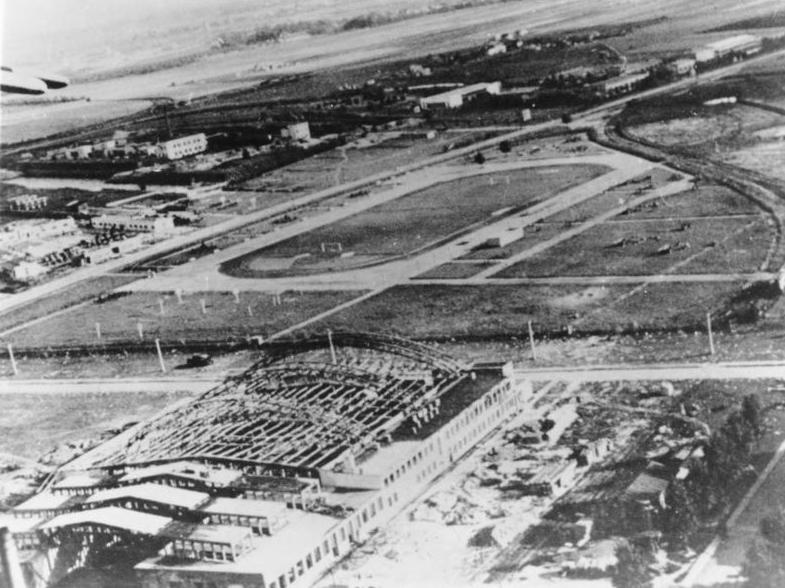
The Warsaw PZL plant in December 1939

Państwowe Zakłady Lotnicze was established in Warsaw in 1928 as a state-owned company, and was based on the earlier Centralne Warsztaty Lotnicze - Central Aviation Workshops. First to be produced was a licensed version of a French fighter, the Wibault 70, but from then on the company produced exclusively its own designs. In the next decade a talented designer Zygmunt Puławski designed a series of high-wing, all-metal modern fighters: PZL P.1, P.6, P.7 and P.11. The latter two types were used as basic fighters in the Polish Air Force from 1933 onwards. The last variant, PZL P.24, developed after Puławski's death in an air crash, was exported to four countries. PZL also mass-produced a light bomber, PZL.23 Karaś, and a modern medium bomber, PZL.37 Łoś, as well as building small numbers of sport aircraft (PZL.5, PZL.19, PZL.26), and liaison aircraft (PZL Ł.2); and developing prototypes of passenger aircraft. In the late 1930s the company also developed several prototypes of more modern fighters and bombers — and a passenger airliner, the PZL.44 Wicher. However, World War II prevented these aircraft from entering production. PZL was the largest Polish pre-war aircraft manufacturer.

In 1934, the main factory in Warsaw was named PZL WP-1 (Wytwórnia Płatowców 1 - Airframe Works 1) in the Okęcie district of Warsaw. A new division PZL WP-2 was built in Mielec in 1938-1939, but production was only just starting there at the outbreak of World War II. An engine factory division, PZL WS-1 in Warsaw-Okęcie (Wytwórnia Silników - Engine Works 1), produced mostly licensed versions of British Bristol engines, such as the Bristol Pegasus and the Bristol Mercury. The WS-1 factory was former Polskie Zakłady Skody, the Polish division of Skoda Works, and was nationalized and renamed in 1936. In 1937-1939 a new engine division, PZL WS-2, was built in Rzeszów.

=== Situation post-war ===
During World War II and the five-year German occupation, all Polish aviation industry was taken over by German firms, and as a result, almost completely destroyed. By the end of the war, all factories were either ruined or robbed of tooling. Despite it, from 1944 there were carried out efforts to design new aircraft, in primitive conditions (first of all, in the LWD). No engines nor suitable production facilities were available at first. The post-war communist government of Poland wanted to break all connections with pre-war Poland: from the late 1940s the name PZL ceased to be used, and new aerospace factories were named WSK (Wytwórnia Sprzętu Komunikacyjnego - Transport Equipment Manufacturing Plant). Under the Soviet-influenced, centrally planned economy, all indigenous projects were abandoned, in a favour of manufacturing Soviet-licensed aircraft. No own designs were produced for a decade, and only in late 1950s, after the stalinist period (1956), did the PZL brand return to designing new aircraft.

The ZPLiS PZL - Zjednoczenie Przemysłu Lotniczego i Silnikowego PZL - PZL Aircraft and Engine Industry Union, which grouped all state-owned aerospace industry factories, was created in following years, but it only enjoyed some economic autonomy from 1973 onwards. It consisted of 19 factories, a research institute, and the Pezetel Foreign Trade Center - CHZ Pezetel, which represented all the Polish aerospace industry abroad (Pezetel being the pronunciation of an abbreviation PZL in Polish). Consequently, in the 1970s some WSK factories also introduced the PZL abbreviation to their names. After the fall of communism in Poland in 1989, all manufacturers became separate companies, initially state-owned, still sharing the PZL name.

== Locations ==
=== PZL "Warszawa-Okęcie" ===
The main factory PZL WP-1 in Warsaw was destroyed during World War II, mostly during the German evacuation in 1944. In 1946, the CSS construction bureau (Centralne Studium Samolotów - Central Aircraft Study) was set up there. As the factory was rebuilt, it was renamed in 1950 as the WSK Nr.4, and in 1956 as the WSK-Okęcie.

It first produced licensed versions of Soviet types and aircraft developed by other Polish companies. From 1958 onwards it started to produce its own designs under the PZL brand, starting with the PZL-101 Gawron. The factory developed mainly light sports, trainer and utility aircraft. An attempt of producing and airliner PZL MD-12 was unsuccessful. The best-known designs are the PZL-104 Wilga utility aircraft, which was produced in larger numbers than any other Polish-designed aircraft; and the PZL-106 Kruk agricultural aircraft. During the 1970s the factory adopted the name WSK "PZL Warszawa-Okęcie", which after the fall of the communist system was changed in 1989 to PZL Warszawa-Okęcie. In 2001 the factory was bought by the Spanish company EADS CASA (now part of Airbus Defence and Space) and since then has been known as EADS PZL Warszawa-Okęcie SA.

=== WSK "PZL-Mielec" / PZL Mielec ===
The PZL WP2 factory in Mielec became a part of Heinkel during the German occupation of Poland, and manufactured parts for German aircraft. After the war the factory was named first PZL No.1 works, then from 1949 WSK-Mielec, and later WSK "PZL-Mielec". It became the biggest post-war Polish aircraft producer. It manufactured mostly licensed Soviet types, such as the Antonov An-2 transport biplane and early jet fighters: Mikoyan-Gurevich MiG-15 (as Lim-1 and Lim-2) and Mikoyan-Gurevich MiG-17 (as Lim-5 and Lim-6). It also produced the Polish-designed TS-8 Bies piston trainer and TS-11 Iskra jet trainer, and the PZL M-15 Belphegor the world's only jet agricultural aircraft. Large numbers of aircraft were exported abroad, mostly to the USSR. From the 1970s onward it produced mostly its own developments of licensed civil aircraft, the best known are the PZL M-18 Dromader agricultural aircraft, which was exported to numerous countries, and the PZL M-28 Skytruck/Bryza light transport aircraft. In 1998 the state factory WSK PZL-Mielec went bankrupt and was changed into the state-owned Polskie Zakłady Lotnicze Sp.z o.o. (Polish Aviation Works) (PZL Mielec).

On March 16, 2007, PZL Mielec was purchased by the Sikorsky Aircraft Corporation, a unit of United Technologies Corporation (UTX). It still produces M-18 and M-28 aircraft.

=== WSK "PZL-Świdnik" ===
In 1951 a third national aerospace factory, WSK-Świdnik, was built in Świdnik, and in 1957 it was renamed to WSK "PZL-Świdnik". Since 1956 it has become one of the world's major helicopter manufacturers, producing helicopters under Soviet licences, starting from the SM-1 (Mil Mi-1). Świdnik was the main producer of the Mi-1 and the exclusive producer of the Mil Mi-2, which was widely used throughout the world. Since the late 1980s, Świdnik has been producing a Polish-designed medium helicopter PZL W-3 Sokół. It also produces a light helicopter, the PZL SW-4 Puszczyk. After 1991 the state factory became a state-owned corporation (WSK "PZL-Świdnik" SA). It also produced the SZD-30 Pirat, PW-5 and PW-6 gliders and cooperates widely with other nations' manufacturers, e.g., in the manufacture of Agusta A109 fuselages.

In early 2010 the factory was acquired by AgustaWestland.

=== PZL-Bielsko / Allstar PZL Glider ===
Glider manufacturer SZD (Szybowcowy Zakład Doświadczalny - Glider Experimental Works) was created in Bielsko-Biała in 1948. The company grew and had production plants in additional locations, during this process it was renamed several times until it got its name PZL-Bielsko in the 1990s. It was one of the biggest sailplane factories and exported its gliders world-wide.

In 2002 Allstar PZL Glider Sp. z o.o. acquired the production plant in Bielsko-Biala and the Type Certificates of the following SZD sailplanes: SZD-59-1 Acro - a single-seater for aerobatics and cross-country, SZD-54-2 Perkoz – a double-seater training-glider for aerobatic and cross-country, SZD-55-1 Nexus – a single seater glider of the standard class, SZD-51-1 Junior - single seater training glider of the club class, SZD-50 Puchacz - double-seater training-glider and SZD-48-3 Jantar Standard 3 – single-seater glider of standard class.

The company further manufactures and develops the first four SZD-glider models. Allstar PZL Glider is also producing and distributing spare parts for all six types mentioned above. On the occasion of the air show “Aero” 2019 in Friedrichshafen Allstar PZL Glider has presented its proof-of-concept of a new electric propulsion system for the SZD-55 Nexus. The electric sustainer, developed by the company and named “Allstar-e-motion”, is right now in the advanced certification process. The system will also be available as an assembly kit for retrofitting of existing SZD-55s.

=== WSK-Rzeszów ===
The engine division WS-2 of the PZL was built in Rzeszów in 1937-1939. After the war it still bore a name PZL (Państwowe Zakłady Lotnicze) until 1951, when it was renamed WSK-Rzeszów. From 1949 it manufactured Soviet-licensed M-11 engines, later, among others, ASh-62IR, turboshaft engines GTD-350 and Polish jet engines SO-1. The factory was bought by United Technologies in 2002 and changed its name to Pratt & Whitney Rzeszów in 2015.

=== WSK "PZL-Kalisz" ===
In 1952 the engine manufacturer WSK-Kalisz was created. It manufactured mostly Soviet-licensed engines, first piston (the Shvetsov ASh-82 and the Ivchenko AI-14) and then jet (the Klimov VK-1). It also produced Polish piston engines, such as the WN-3, and other equipment. In October 1996 it was renamed WSK "PZL-Kalisz" and became a corporation (SA).

=== WSK "PZL Warszawa II" ===
WSK Warszawa II was created in 1952 in Warsaw as a manufacturer of aircraft parts and military equipment parts. In 1995 it was changed from a state factory to a corporation WSK "PZL Warszawa II" SA.

== Aircraft ==
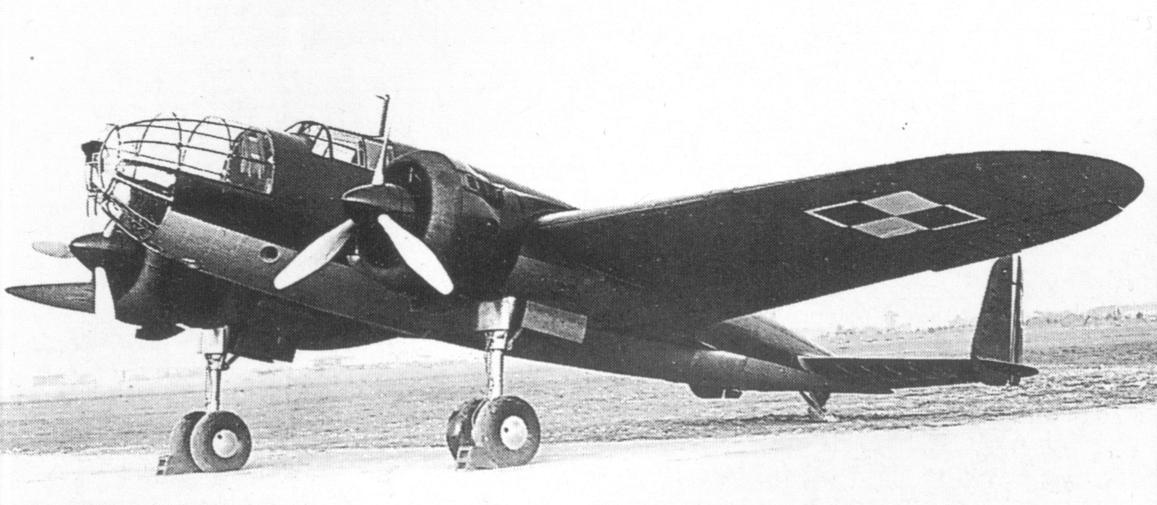
PZL.37B medium bomber

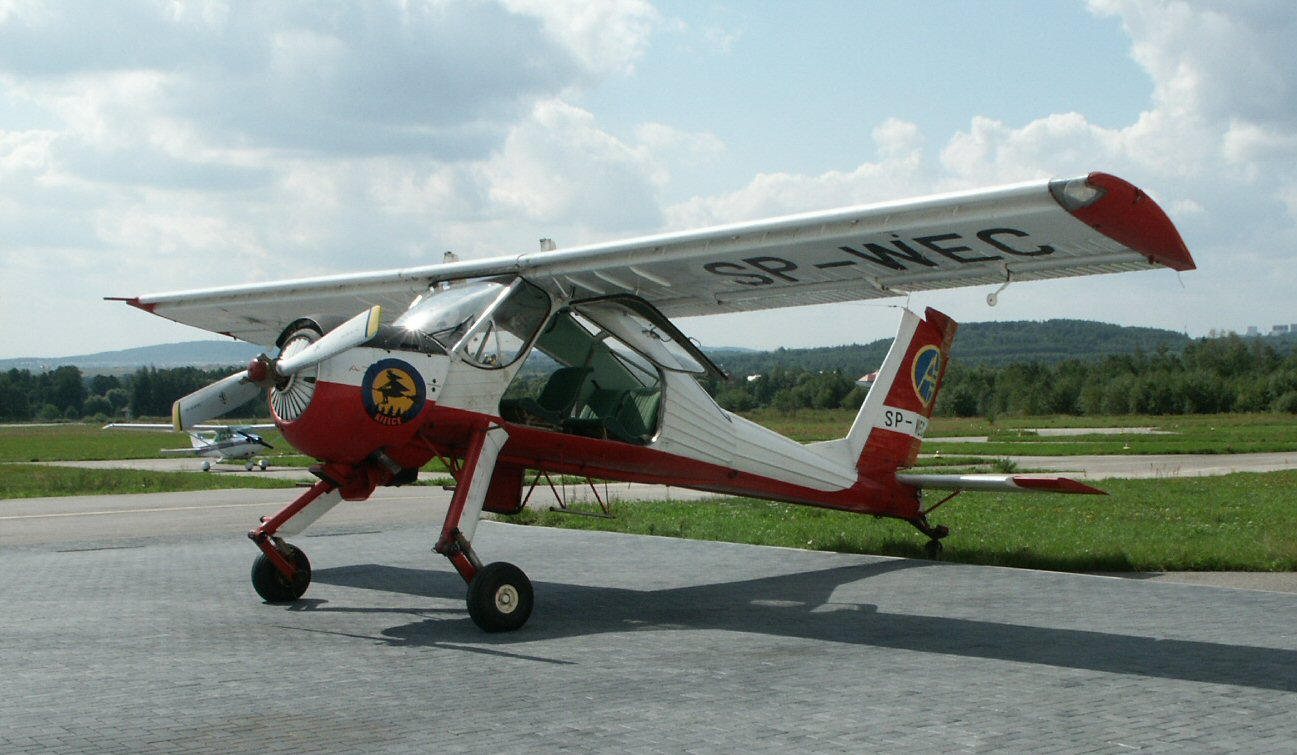
PZL-104 Wilga

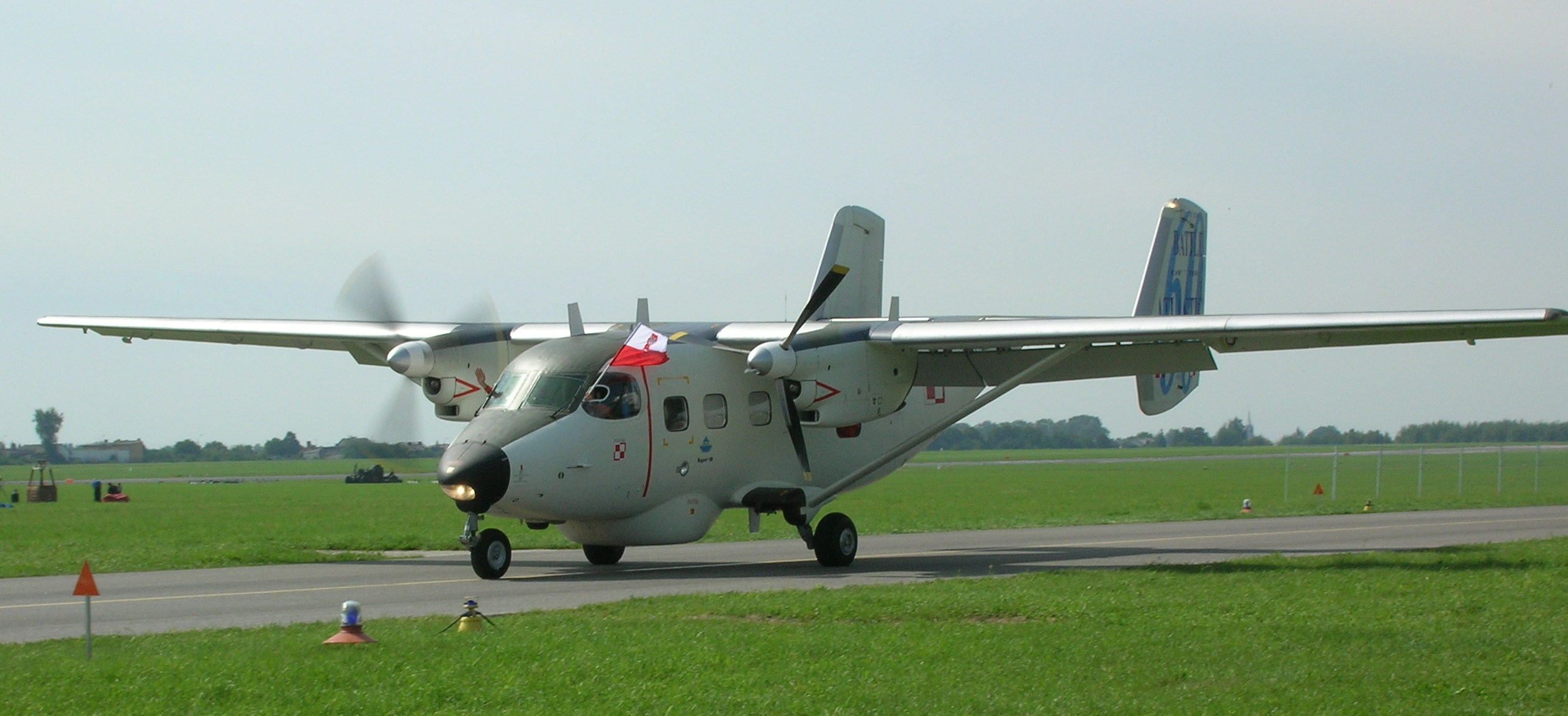
PZL M-28B Bryza 1R maritime patrol aircraft

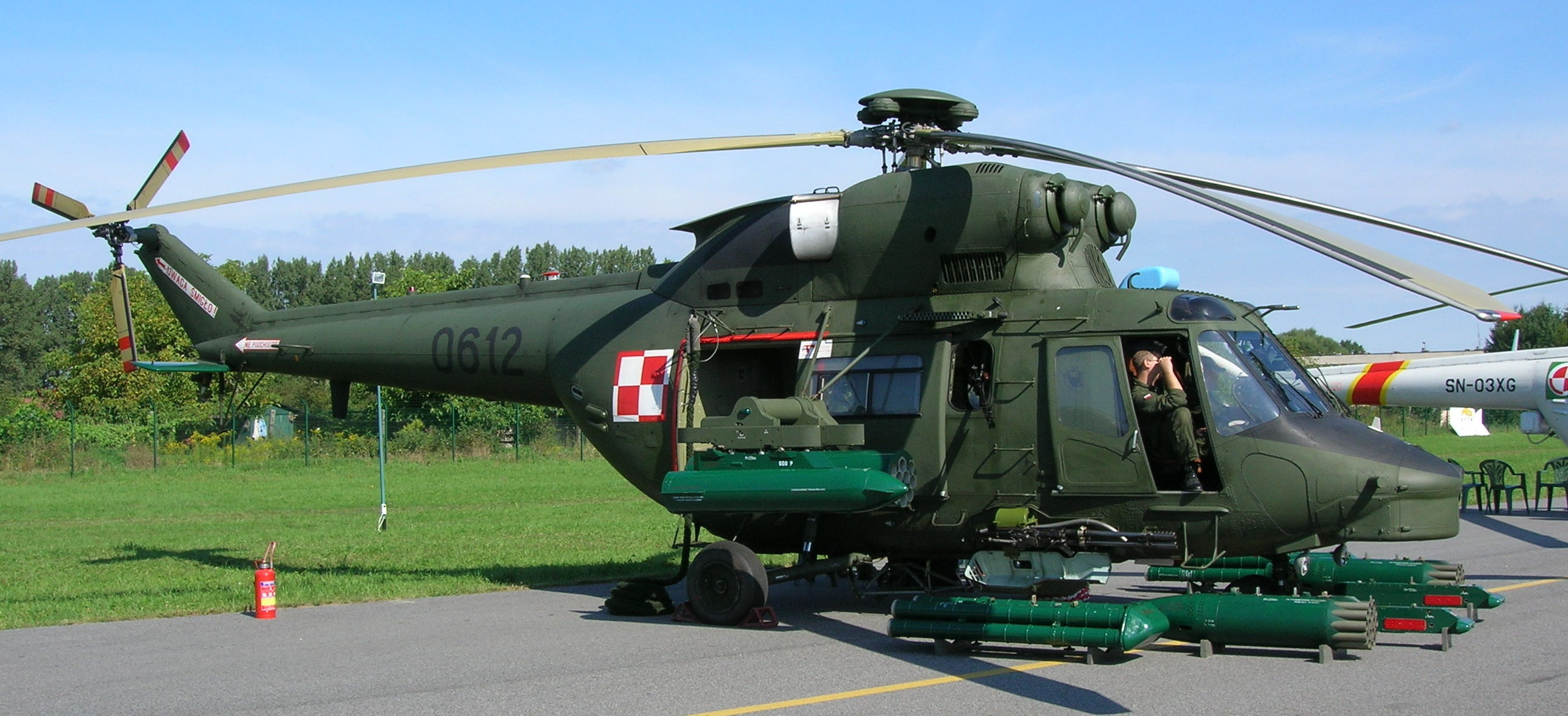
PZL W-3 Sokół of the Polish Armed Forces

Model name	First flight	Number built	Type
PZL P.1	1929	2	Single-engine monoplane fighter
PZL P.2	N/A	0	Single-engine monoplane fighter, revised P.1; never finished
PZL Ł.2	1930	31	Single-engine monoplane liaison airplane
PZL.3	N/A	0	Four-engine monoplane bomber
PZL.4	N/A	0	Single-engine passenger aircraft project
PZL.4	1932	1	Prototype three-engine monoplane airliner
PZL.5	1930	15	Single-engine biplane sport airplane
PZL P.6	1930	1	Single piston engine monoplane fighter
PZL P.7	1930	151	Single piston engine monoplane fighter
PZL.8	N/A	0	Projected floatplane version of PZL.5
PZL P.8	1931	2	Prototype single-engine monoplane fighter
PZL.9	N/A	0	Twin-float version of Ł.2
PZL P.9			Designation for PZL P.8/II
PZL.10	N/A	0	Low-wing, twin-engine monoplane bomber
PZL P.10	N/A	1	Single engine monoplane fighter; proposed third prototype of P.8
PZL P.11	1931	325	Single engine monoplane fighter developed from the P.7
PZL.12	1931	1	Single engine monoplane flying boat; also known as PZL.H
PZL.13	N/A	0	Single-engine, low-wing monoplane communications aircraft
PZL.14	N/A	0	Single-engine, high-wing tourer; abandoned in favor of PZL.19
PZL.15	N/A	0	Low-wing, twin-float derivative of Ł.2
PZL.16	1932	1	High wing, single engine cabin monoplane; airliner derivative of Ł.2
PZL.17	N/A	0	PZL.16 derivative with improved fuselage design; lost competition to PWS-54
PZL.18	N/A	0	Twin-boom torpedo bomber floatplane
PZL.19	1932	3	Low-wing cabin tourer
PZL.20	N/A	0	Lightweight fighter-trainer monoplane; derivative of PZL-19
PZL.22	N/A	0	Experimental tailless aircraft
PZL.23 Karaś	1934	253	Single engine monoplane light bomber
PZL P.24	1933	184	Single engine monoplane fighter; export version of P.11
PZL.25	N/A	0	Single engine heavy escort fighter derived from the PZL.23
PZL.26	1934	5	Three-seat derivative of PZL.19
PZL.27	1934	1	Cantilever high-wing trimotor airliner
PZL P.28	1932	1	Three piston engine monoplane airliner
PZL.30 Żubr	1936	20	Twin-engine monoplane bomber; PZL production version of LWS-6 medium bomber
PZL.31	N/A	0	Bomber project
PZL.33	N/A	0	Single-engine, low-wing monoplane fighter
PZL.37 Łoś	1936	120+	Twin-engine monoplane bomber
PZL.38 Wilk	1938	2	Two piston engine monoplane fighter-bomber
PZL.39	N/A	0	Single-engine, low-wing monoplane fighter
PZL.40 Mewa	N/A	0	Parasol monoplane observation aircraft
PZL.42	1936	1	Trials aircraft, developed from the PZL.23
PZL.43	1937	54	Single engine monoplane light bomber
PZL.44 Wicher	1938	1	Twin engine monoplane airliner
PZL.45 Sokół	N/A	0	Single engine monoplane fighter project (1936)
PZL.46 Sum	1938	2	Single engine monoplane light bomber
PZL.48 Lampart	N/A	0	Twin engine monoplane fighter-bomber project (1938)
PZL.49 Miś	N/A	0	Twin engine monoplane bomber project, based on PZL.37; cancelled due to outbreak of WWII
PZL.50 Jastrząb	1939	2	Single engine monoplane fighter
PZL.53 Jastrząb II	N/A	0	Single engine monoplane fighter
PZL.54 Ryś	N/A	0	Twin engine monoplane heavy fighter project developed from the PZL.48 (1939); cancelled due to outbreak of WWII
PZL.55	N/A	0	Single engine monoplane fighter project (1939); cancelled due to Soviet invasion of Poland
PZL.56 Kania	N/A	0	Single engine monoplane fighter project (1939); rejected in favor of PZL.55
CSS -> WSK-Okęcie -> PZL "Warszawa-Okęcie"
CSS-10	1948	2	Single piston engine monoplane trainer
CSS-11	1948	2	Single piston engine monoplane trainer
CSS-13	1948	~500	License built single piston engine biplane utility airplane
LWD Junak	1948	252	Single piston engine monoplane trainer
CSS-12	1950	1	Two piston engine monoplane airliner
CSS S-13	1953	91	License built single piston engine biplane utility airplane
WSK Jak-12		1,191	License built single piston engine monoplane utility airplane
PZL-101 Gawron	1958	325	Single piston engine monoplane utility airplane
PZL-102 Kos	1958	10	Single piston engine monoplane sport airplane
PZL MD-12	1959	3	Four piston engine monoplane airliner
PZL-104 Wilga	1962	1,000+	Single piston engine monoplane utility airplane
PZL-105 Flaming	1989	2	Single piston engine monoplane utility airplane
PZL-106 Kruk	1973	275+	Single piston engine monoplane agricultural airplane
PZL-110 Koliber	1978		Single piston engine monoplane sport airplane
PZL-112 Junior	2000	1	Single piston engine monoplane trainer
PZL-130 Orlik	1984	59	Single turboprop engine monoplane trainer
PZL-126 Mrowka	1990	2	Single piston engine monoplane agricultural airplane
PZL-230 Skorpion	N/A	0	Two jet engine monoplane attack airplane
WSK-Mielec -> PZL-Mielec
PZL Szpak-4T	1948	10	Single piston engine monoplane utility airplane
PZL S-1	1945	1	Single piston engine monoplane trainer
PZL S-4 Kania	1957	3	Single piston engine monoplane trainer
PZL TS-8 Bies	1955	251	Single piston engine monoplane trainer
PZL M2	1958	2	Single piston engine monoplane trainer
PZL M3 Pliszka	1959	3	Glider
PZL M7	N/A	0	Two jet engine monoplane trainer
PZL M8 Pelikan	N/A	0	Glider
PZL M4 Tarpan	1961	2	Single piston engine monoplane trainer
PZL An-2	1961	11,000+	License built single piston engine biplane utility airplane
PZL Lim-1	1952	227	License built single jet engine monoplane fighter
PZL Lim-2		500	License built single jet engine monoplane fighter
PZL Lim-5	1956	666	License built single jet engine monoplane fighter
PZL Lim-6		110	License built single jet engine monoplane attack airplane
PZL TS-11 Iskra	1960	424	Single jet engine monoplane trainer
PZL TS-16 Grot	N/A	0	Single jet engine monoplane trainer
PZL M12	N/A	0	Two piston engine monoplane utility airplane
PZL M19	N/A	0	Two jet engine monoplane trainer
PZL M14	N/A	0	Single turboprop engine monoplane agricultural airplane
PZL M15 Belphegor	1973	175	Single jet engine biplane agricultural airplane
PZL M16	N/A	0	Two jet engine monoplane trainer
PZL M18 Dromader	1976	759	Single piston engine monoplane agricultural airplane
PZL M17	1977	1	Single piston engine monoplane utility airplane
PZL M20 Mewa	1979	33	Two piston engine monoplane utility airplane
PZL M19	N/A	0	Two turboprop engine monoplane transport airplane
PZL M21 Dromader Mini	1982	2	Single piston engine monoplane agricultural airplane
PZL M24 Dromader Super	1987	4	Single piston engine monoplane agricultural airplane
PZL M25 Dromader Micro	N/A	0	Single piston engine monoplane agricultural airplane
PZL M26 Iskierka	1986	9	Single piston engine monoplane trainer
PZL An-28	1984		Two turboprop engine monoplane transport
PZL M28 Skytruck	1993		Two turboprop engine monoplane transport
PZL M30	N/A	0	Single turboprop engine monoplane agricultural airplane
PZL M32	N/A	0	Two turboprop engine monoplane utility airplane
PZL M34	N/A	0	Two turboprop engine monoplane transport
PZL I-22 Iryda	1985	17	Two jet engine monoplane trainer
WSK "PZL Świdnik" -> PZL-Świdnik
PZL SM-1	1956	1,594	License built single piston engine utility helicopter
PZL SM-2	1959	89	Single piston engine utility helicopter
PZL Mi-2	1965	5,400+	License built two turboshaft engine utility helicopter
PZL SM-4 Łątka	N/A	1	Single piston engine utility helicopter
PZL Kania	1979	19	Two turboshaft engine utility helicopter
PZL W-3 Sokół	1979	149	Two turboshaft engine utility helicopter
PZL SW-4 Puszczyk	1996	40	Single turboshaft engine utility helicopter
PZL PW-5	1993		Glider
PZL PW-6	1998	~26	Glider
PZL I-23 Manager	1999	2	Single piston engine monoplane sport airplane
PZL-Bielsko -> Allstar PZL Glider
SZD-50-3 Puchacz	1979	333	Glider double seater
SZD-48-3 Jantar Standard 3	1983	349	Glider standard class
SZD-51-1 Junior	1984	246	Glider club class
SZD-59-1 Acro	1993	48	Glider single seater, aerobatic and utility
SZD-55-1 Nexus (Promyk)	1998	125	Glider standard class
SZD-54-2 Perkoz	2010	30	Glider double seater, aerobatic and utility

=== Other types of aircraft ===
- PZL Krosno KR-03 Puchatek - glider

=== Engines ===
- PZL-3

== See also ==
- Gliders built at PZL-Bielsko
