= PZL.44 Wicher =

Polish airliner prototype

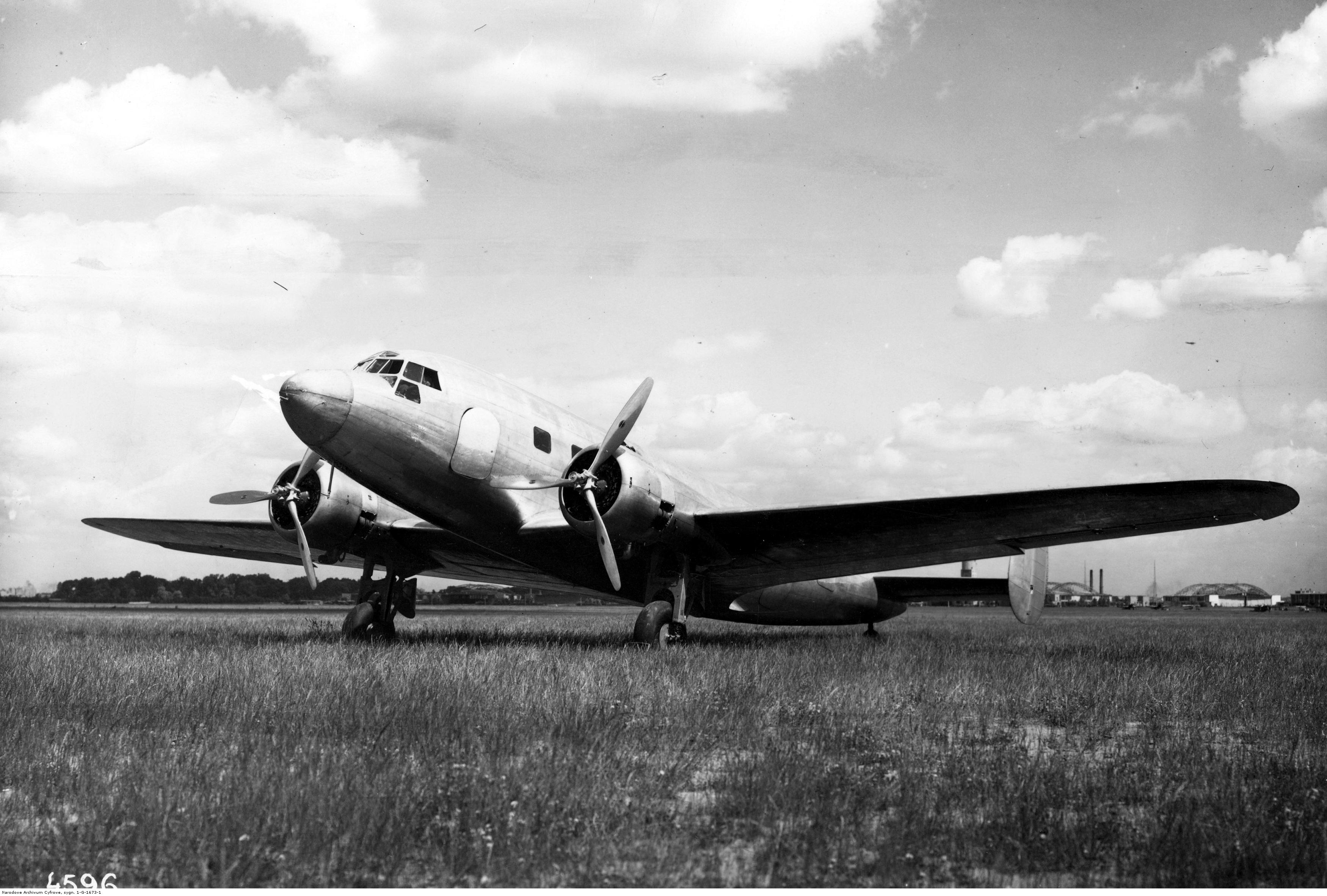

General information
- Type: Passenger plane
- Manufacturer: Państwowe Zakłady Lotnicze
- Status: Prototype
- Primary user: LOT Polish Airlines
- Number built: 1 (prototype)

History
- Manufactured: 1938
- First flight: 12 March 1938
- Retired: 1939

The PZL.44 Wicher (gale) was a prototype of 14-seat, twin-engine Polish airliner, built in the Państwowe Zakłady Lotnicze (PZL) in 1938. It was to compete with the DC-2 and Lockheed Super Electra.

== Design and development ==
In mid-1930s the Polish Ministry of Communication ordered a development of an own passenger plane for LOT Polish Airlines, using imported airliners so far, mostly Lockheed Model 10 Electra and DC-2. The plane was designed in the state factory Państwowe Zakłady Lotnicze under direction of Wsiewołod Jakimiuk in 1936-1937.

The prototype was flown on March 12, 1938 by Bolesław Orliński. The aircraft was designated PZL.44 Wicher. In December 1938 it was given to LOT for evaluation, with registration SP-BPJ. Initially LOT airlines ordered 10 PZL.44s but high cost of a single plane and delays in development were reasons for decreasing order to 4, then for cancelling it in 1939. LOT bought a batch of 10 cheaper Lockheed Model 14 Super Electra in 1938 and 1939 instead.

Wicher was the first modern airliner designed in Poland. Its construction was very modern, but it is estimated, that the whole program was too ambitious, because a development of an own passenger plane, without much hope of export, was unprofitable. Moreover, LOT airlines found operation features of well-proven Lockheed Super Electra more satisfactory. Lockheed offered a possibility of licence production as well. Besides, the Wicher development caused delays in development of new fighter aircraft, like PZL.50 Jastrząb, that were more needed in an advent of the war.

=== Description ===
Twin-engine low-wing cantilever monoplane of all-metal construction, metal covered (with Alclad sheet). Fuselage semi-monocoque. Crew cockpit in front with a crew of 4: two pilots, radio operator and a mechanic. Passenger cab with 14 seats in two rows, dimensions: length 9 m, width 1.7 m, height 1.85 m. In the rear, WC and (planned) buffet with steward's seat. Crew doors on the left in front, passengers' doors on the left at the rear. Baggage space was between cockpit and the passenger cab and in a tail section, capacity: 5 m^{3}. Elliptical wing (shape similar to PZL.37 Łoś bomber). Engine nacelles in wings. Three-blade Hamilton Standard propellers. Retractable conventional landing gear - main gear with single wheels retractable to engine nacelles. Double elliptical tailfin. Fuel tanks 2200 L in wings (normal load 1800 L).

== Operational history ==
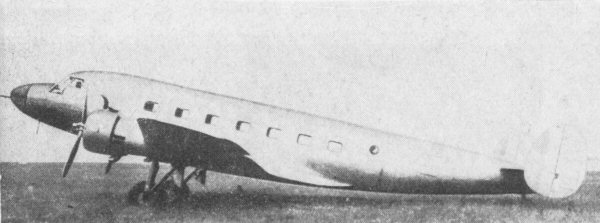

After the outbreak of World War II, on 1 September 1939, the prototype was evacuated from Warsaw to Lwów, but it damaged a landing gear and was left there. It was next captured by the invading Soviets and evaluated in Moscow.

== Operators ==
Poland

- LOT Polish Airlines operated single prototype and was expected operator of a series.

== Specifications (PZL.44) ==
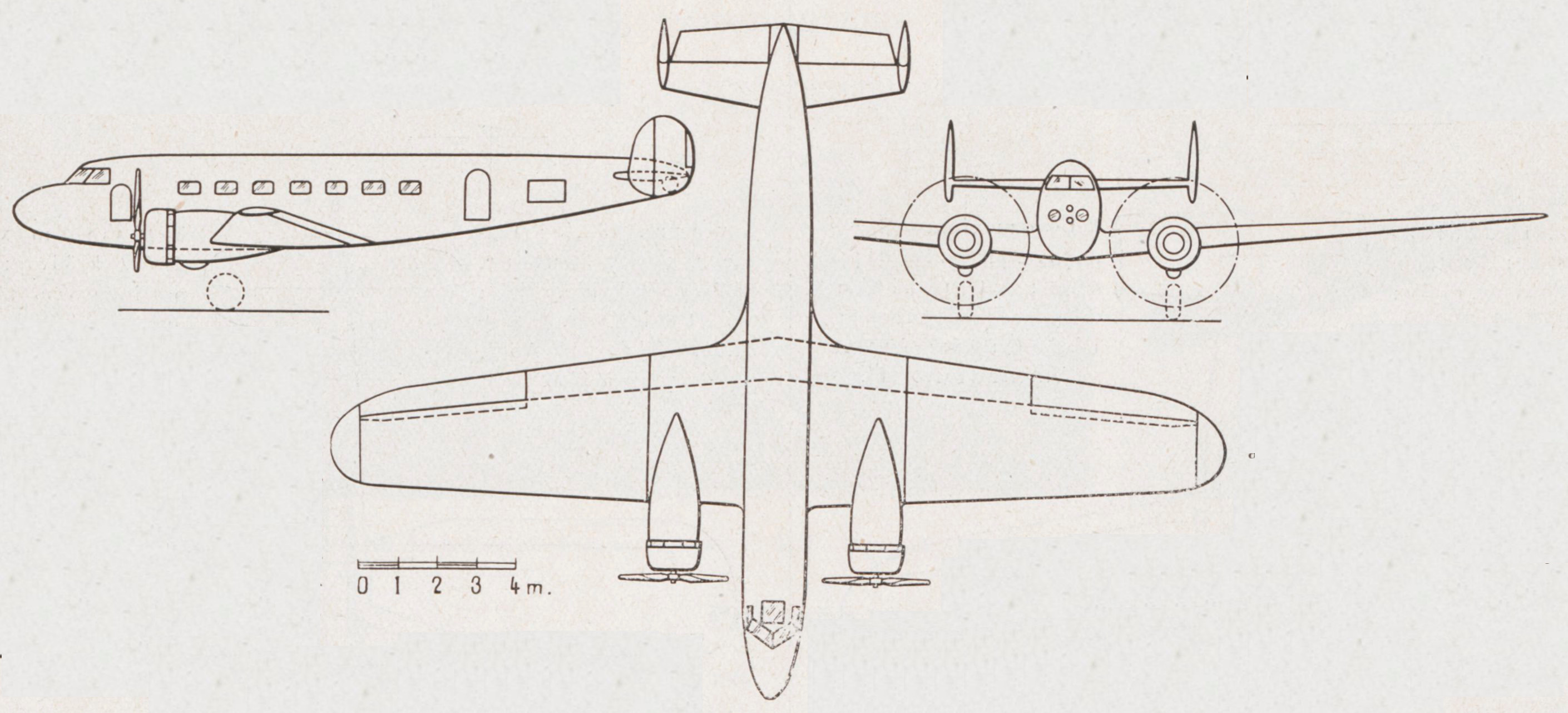
3-views of the PZL.44.

Data from Polish aircraft 1893-1939

General characteristics

- Crew: 4
- Capacity: 14 passengers
- Length: 18.45 m (60 ft 6 in)
- Wingspan: 23.8 m (78 ft 1 in)
- Height: 4.8 m (15 ft 9 in)
- Wing area: 75 m^{2} (810 sq ft)
- Empty weight: 5,990 kg (13,206 lb)
- Gross weight: 9,260 kg (20,415 lb)
- Max takeoff weight: 9,500 kg (20,944 lb)
- Fuel capacity: 1,800 L (480 US gal; 400 imp gal) fuel; 110 L (29 US gal; 24 imp gal) oil
- Powerplant: 2 × Wright GR-1820-G2 Cyclone 9-cylinder air-cooled radial piston engine, 750 kW (1,000 hp) each
- Propellers: 3-bladed Hamilton-Standard constant-speed propellers

Performance

- Maximum speed: 360 km/h (220 mph, 190 kn) at 2,000 m (6,600 ft)
- Cruise speed: 280 km/h (170 mph, 150 kn) at 65% power
- Stall speed: 110 km/h (68 mph, 59 kn)
- Range: 1,840 km (1,140 mi, 990 nmi)
- Service ceiling: 6,850 m (22,470 ft)
- Single engine ceiling: 2,300 m (7,500 ft)
- Rate of climb: 6.93 m/s (1,365 ft/min)
- Wing loading: 123.5 kg/m^{2} (25.3 lb/sq ft)
- Power/mass: 0.138 kW/kg (0.084 hp/lb)

== See also ==
Aircraft of comparable role, configuration, and era

- Douglas DC-2
- Lockheed Model 14 Super Electra
