= PZL.50 Jastrząb =

Polish prototype fighter aircraft in 1939

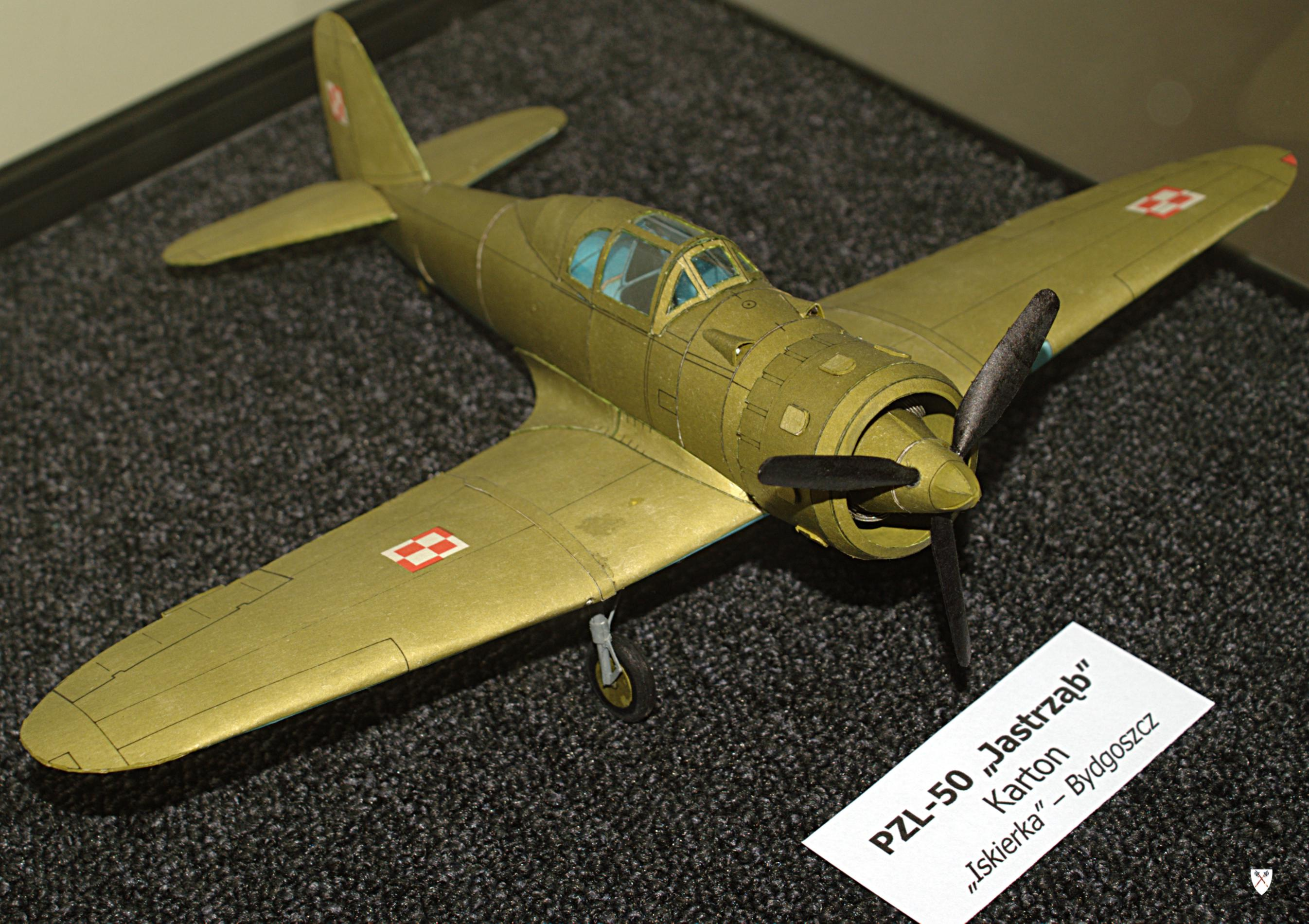

General information
- Type: Fighter aircraft
- National origin: Poland
- Manufacturer: Państwowe Zakłady Lotnicze
- Status: Never entered service
- Primary user: Polish Air Force
- Number built: 2 prototypes (+5 incomplete serial aircraft)

History
- Manufactured: 1939
- First flight: February 1939
- Variants: PZL.53 Jastrząb II; PZL.56 Kania

PZL.50 Jastrząb (Hawk) was a Polish late 1930s fighter aircraft designed by Wsiewołod Jakimiuk at Państwowe Zakłady Lotnicze. The single-seat low-wing monoplane was to serve as a multi-purpose fighter and escort to replace all other fighters in the Polish Military Aviation. Designed after 1936, its prototype first flew in February 1939. By September, the first production aircraft were nearing completion, but further development was interrupted by the Nazi-Soviet Invasion of Poland.

== Design and development ==
In early 1930s the Polish Air Force was equipped with the then state-of-the-art PZL P.11 all-metal gull wing monoplanes, the latest of a family of fighter aircraft designed by Zygmunt Puławski. However, by the end of decade they had become obsolete, as new fighter and bomber aircraft with higher performance started to appear. There was no development carried out on other fighters, apart from PZL P.24, which was an improved export variant of Puławski's P.11 design. By the mid-1930s, the Polish Air Force Command led by Gen. Ludomił Rayski expected, that a basic Polish general-purpose fighter and light bomber would be a twin-engine heavy fighter-bomber PZL.38 Wilk, supplemented by a light, cheap low-wing monoplane PZL.39/LWS-4. While potentially a suitable design, the PZL.38 had problems finding proper engines and the estimated performance of the PZL.39 was too low (maximum speed 400 km/h (250 mph)), resulting in both programs being canceled. Future wartime experience showed, that heavy fighters were not well matched against fast single-engine interceptors. It became evident that the Air Force needed a modern interceptor aircraft to defend the country, and at last, in October 1936, the Armament Committee (KSUS) submitted a demand for such an interceptor.

In late 1936, Rayski ordered the PZL's Chief Designer Wsiewołod Jakimiuk, a lead designer of the P.11c, to abandon work on the PZL.44 Wicher passenger airliner, and to start work on a modern single-engine fighter with retractable landing gear and a speed of some 500 km/h (310 mph). At the same time, Rayski selected the British Bristol Mercury VIII (840 metric hp/825 imperial hp) radial engine as the project's powerplant. PZL had already manufactured Mercury V engines and would be able to retool to build the later version, as a Polish-produced engine was one of primary considerations in the design. This choice however restricted performance of the future fighter, and, according to historians, the whole program started at least two years too late.

The project PZL.50 named Jastrząb (Hawk), started in late 1936. The design was accepted by the Air Force Command in 1937 and two prototypes were ordered. In June 1938, 300 PZL Merkury VIII engines built under license in PZL WS-1 factory were ordered, with first to be delivered in June 1939. The engine for the prototype was imported from Great Britain and fitted in September 1938. The prototype was almost ready by October, but its completion was delayed by the lack of a retractable landing gear, delivered by the British Dowty firm. Due to the delay, the Polish aviation authorities missed the chance of starting flying tests with some temporary fixed landing gear, since Polish industry had not yet produced suitable retractable gears. Avia-manufactured undercarriage units were specified for the production series.

Finally, the first prototype PZL.50/I was completed and flown in late February 1939 by pilot Jerzy Widawski. Despite being officially classified as a secret, on 27 February it was on static display for the Italian Foreign Minister, Count Galeazzo Ciano. Tests were carried out mainly by Bolesław Orliński and several other pilots who noted that the prototype, after modifications to the tail, exhibited satisfactory handling and maneuverability characteristics although it was not agile enough as an interceptor. The greatest concern was that even without radio and machine guns, it was able to achieve only 420 to 430 km/h (260 to 270 mph). The Mercury VIII engine had problems with delivering full power due to an unsuitable carburetor intake and, after modifications, the prototype was able to reach 442 km/h (275 mph). Test pilots continued to complain about power output being too low, although with a better engine, some observers estimated that a production example would have been able to top 470 km/h (290 mph)

It was first planned to order 300 PZL.50s, but in April 1939, the new Air Force Commander Gen. Kalkus and Air Defence Inspector Gen. Józef Zając estimated that the current PZL.50 design did not meet its specified performance goals and ordered PZL to develop it further, building an improved pattern aircraft with only a limited series of 25-30 aircraft on order, designated the PZL.50A. Production aircraft were to have the wing area increased from 15.8 m^{2} to 19 m^{2}. The total planned order was decreased to 200 and Poland started to look for fighters abroad, ordering 160 Morane-Saulnier MS 406 fighters from France. As an interim measure, 100 PZL P.11g Kobuz fighters were ordered, fitting the P.11c airframe with Mercury VIII engines.

The second prototype PZL.50/II was to be equipped with a more powerful 1,200-1,400 hp engine, but never was. Only in 1939, was the PZL.50/II reworked with a 1,100 hp Gnome-Rhône 14N21 for an export variant PZL.50B (estimated maximum speed 560 km/h (350 mph)) or 1,060 hp Bristol Taurus II or III for the Polish Air Force (estimated speed 530 to 560 km/h (330 to 350 mph)). The Gnome-Rhone engine was only delivered in August 1939, while the newest British Taurus was scheduled to be delivered in October or November, but final deliveries were prevented by war. Nonetheless, Taurus development had proved to be troublesome. Other possible engine alternatives were the Polish PZL Waran engine, which was to be ready in spring 1940, the 1,000 hp Pratt & Whitney Twin Wasp or 1,375 hp Bristol Hercules. As early as 1938, Jakimiuk proposed a variant with the 1,100 hp Hispano-Suiza 12Y inline engine, designated PZL.56 Kania, but it was not accepted.

== Operational history ==
By the end of August 1939, the first unarmed flying prototype PZL.50/I, the second incomplete and engine-less prototype PZL.50/II, an incomplete preliminary PZL.50. and parts of four PZL.50As were all that was completed. The first prototype had a short fairing behind the canopy, all the others were distinguished by having a cut down rear fuselage to accommodate an "all-round vision hood". The production series would have incorporated a different canopy and a ventral fuselage fairing. After the German invasion and outbreak of World War II, on 2–3 September 1939, two incomplete aircraft (pattern PZL.50 and PZL.50/II) were moved from the WP-1 factory in Okęcie to Citroën plant at Czerniakowska Street, where they were captured by the Germans, and possibly scrapped after 1940.

The first prototype was flown east by Jan Widawski towards Lwów on 6 September, but crash landed near Rawa Ruska upon running out of fuel.

Because of the secrecy surrounding the aircraft, for over 65 years its existence was only partly known based on four photographs of fragments of the first prototype, made during a presentation to Ciano, two of which are shown in the book, Polish Aircraft 1893-1939 by Jerzy Cynk, which also contains representative drawings of the aircraft. Only in 2005 were a couple of photographs discovered that showed two incomplete aircraft at Czerniakowska street. The photographs made by German soldiers and a Polish amateur photographer, made it possible to authentically reconstruct the PZL.50's design features.

== Versions ==
PZL.50/I
First prototype.
PZL.50/II
Second prototype with fuselage changes (elongated fuselage, long canopy fairing) and with redesigned engine cowling.
PZL.50A
Planned first production variant based on second prototype, powered by PZL Merkury VIII engine (840 hp) and armed with 4 x 7.92 mm km wz.36 machine guns and 100 kg of bombs.
PZL.50B
Planned second production series powered by Bristol Taurus II (1,060 hp) or Gnome-Rhône 14N21 engine (1,100 hp) and armed with 4 x 7.92 mm km wz.36 machine guns, 2 x 20 mm nkm FK wz.38D cannons and 300 kg of bombs.

== Operators (planned) ==
Poland

- Polish Air Force

== Specifications (PZL.50/I) ==
Data from

General characteristics

- Crew: 1
- Length: 8 m (26 ft 3 in)
- Wingspan: 9.7 m (31 ft 10 in)
- Height: 2.7 m (8 ft 10 in)
- Wing area: 15.8 m^{2} (170 sq ft)
- Empty weight: 1,900 kg (4,189 lb)
- Gross weight: 2,400 kg (5,291 lb)
- Powerplant: 1 × PZL Merkury VIII 9-cylinder air-cooled radial piston engine, 615 kW (825 hp)
- Propellers: 3-bladed variable-pitch propeller

Performance

- Maximum speed: 430 km/h (270 mph, 230 kn)
- Combat range: 750 km (470 mi, 400 nmi)
- Service ceiling: 7,500 m (24,600 ft)
- Rate of climb: 12 m/s (2,400 ft/min)

Armament

- Guns: 4 x 7.92 mm (0.312 in) km wz.36 machine guns
- Bombs: 100 kg (220 lb) of bombs

== See also ==
Related development

- PZL.53 Jastrząb II
- PZL.56 Kania

Aircraft of comparable role, configuration, and era

- Bloch MB.150
- Brewster F2A Buffalo
- Curtiss P-36 Hawk
- Fiat G.50
- Fokker D.XXI
- Grumman F4F Wildcat
- IAR 80
- Macchi C.200
- MÁVAG Héja
- Nakajima Ki-43
- Polikarpov I-180
- Reggiane Re.2000
- Seversky P-35
- Weiss Manfréd WM-23 Ezüst Nyíl
