= PZL.23 Karaś =

Polish reconnaissance bomber of WW2

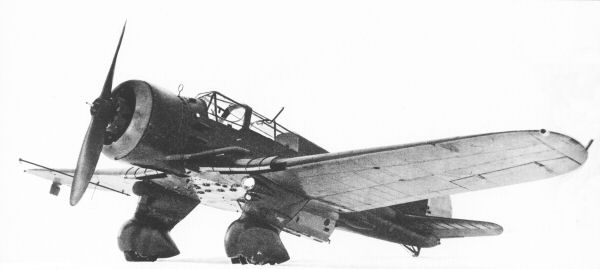
- The third prototype PZL.23/III

General information
- Type: Light bomber and reconnaissance aircraft
- Manufacturer: Państwowe Zakłady Lotnicze
- Primary users: Polish Air Force: Bulgarian Air Force; Royal Romanian Air Force
- Number built: 250 (+3 prototypes)

History
- Manufactured: 1936 - 1938
- Introduction date: 1936
- First flight: 1 April 1934
- Retired: 1946
- Developed into: PZL.43

The PZL.23 Karaś (crucian carp) was a Polish light bomber and reconnaissance aircraft designed in the mid-1930s by PZL in Warsaw.

During the interwar period, the Polish High Command had placed considerable emphasis upon the role of armed aerial reconnaissance aircraft. To meet this interest, during 1931, PZL decided to embark on the development of a new combat aircraft to meet this role. An earlier proposal for a fast single-engine passenger airliner, designated the PZL.13, was adopted as the basis of the new design. The new aircraft, which was designated as the PZL.23, a relatively modern design, which integrated features such as an all-metal body and unconventional wing construction. As the British Bristol Pegasus radial engine was licensed for use in Poland only, export aircraft were instead equipped with the Gnome-Rhône 14N engine. Powered as such and along with some airframe changes, the PZL.23 became the PZL.43.

It was the primary Polish reconnaissance bomber in use during the invasion of Poland. On 2 September 1939, a single PZL.23B of the 21st Escadrille was responsible for the bombing of a factory in Ohlau, inside Germany; the attack represented the first bombing raid to be conducted against a target in territory within the Third Reich. During the following days, the PZL.23 bomber escadrilles were deployed to attack several advancing German armoured columns; they often conducted these attacks at low altitudes, which made them vulnerable to anti-aircraft fire. By the end of 1939, around 120 PZL.23s (86 per cent of the Polish Air Force's inventory of the type) were destroyed; however, of these, only 67 had been lost as a direct result of enemy actions.

== Development ==
=== Background ===
As a result of wartime experiences acquired by the Polish armed forces during the 1919-1921 Polish–Soviet War, during the 1920s and 1930s (now known as the interwar period), a great emphasis was placed upon the role of armed aerial reconnaissance aircraft. According to aviation historian J. B. Cynk, the role was recognised by the Polish High Command as being, aside from the basic fighter aircraft, the most important type of aerial unit in their doctrine. As such, considerable resources and effort was placed upon the creation of sizable army cooperation escadrilles, which were initially principally equipped with foreign-built biplanes such as the French Breguet 19 and Potez 25.

During the late 1920s, it had become increasingly obvious that the existing types used for the aerial reconnaissance role would need to be replaced, which led to the Ministry of War's Aviation Department defining a set of a broad performance requirements desired in an aircraft to fulfil the role. Around the same time, at the Polish state-owned aviation works PZL, the aircraft designer Stanisław Prauss had been studying options for a new fast single-engine airliner, to be designated the PZL.13. An advanced low-wing cantilever monoplane design proposal with an all-metal structure and a Pratt & Whitney Wasp radial engine was selected for further development, however during early 1931, the Ministry of Transport cancelled the project and terminated its sponsorship amid a lack of interest. Accordingly, PZL were keen to embark upon a replacement project in the place of the PZL.13 venture. Following a series of consultations between the company and the Aviation Department, it was decided to embark upon the design of a three-man armed reconnaissance-bomber, using the abortive PZL.13 passenger transport airliner as a starting point for the new aircraft. The resulting design, designated the PZL.23, was only one of several proposals to be produced; alternatives included the PWS.19, a high-wing monoplane, and the Lublin R.XVII, a clean twin-seat biplane with a retractable undercarriage. During late 1931, the Aviation Department decided to opt for the PZL submission.

=== Design phase ===
During early 1932, PZL were authorised to formally proceed with preliminary design work on what would become the PZL.23. An early key design decision was the selection of the British Bristol Pegasus radial engine to power the type, which was domestically produced by Skoda in their Warsaw plant. The emerging design was for a modern combat aircraft, integrating features such as an all-metal body and unconventional wing construction, being built around light closed profiles instead of spars (this wing design had been previously introduced on the PZL.19).

During the spring of 1932, the preliminary design was approved in principle by the Aviation Department, however, in accordance with the department's expressed preferences, the ventral gun turret was redesigned for increased field of fire, as well as to accommodate more capable bomb-aiming equipment. During late 1932, authorisation to proceed with the construction of a batch of three prototypes along with one static-test airframe. However, development would not prove to be a straightforward venture. The diverse requirements of the PZL.23 imposed considerable hurdles in the design phase; in order to produce a relatively fast aircraft, a heavy airframe was practically necessitated, however, it was also important for the type to be able to operate from constrained austere airstrips rapidly established on the front lines of warzones; producing a suitable compromise was not easy.

The venture has been considered to be pioneering in some aspects of its design, which contributed to its design complications. Static testing by the Institute of Aviation Technical Research (ITBL) was both protracted and determined some components to process insufficient strength; these were not completed until 1933. However, completion of the prototypes was delayed to incorporate modifications to address the findings. The name Karaś was selected for the type around this time.

=== Into flight ===
On 1 April 1934, the P.23/I first prototype conducted its maiden flight; it was quickly followed by the second P.23/II prototype. Early flight testing revealed several issues that needed to be resolved, including tail flutter and vibration in the rear fuselage area; another difficulty identified even prior to the first flight was the inadequate visibility from the cockpit for both the pilot and observer. Various measures to rectify these issues were incorporated onto the second and third prototypes.

During the following year, the third P.23/III prototype was completed; on this aircraft, various further refinements were included, such as the pilot's seat having been raised into a new fully glazed canopy arrangement and the engine being positioned lowered down, giving the aircraft a characteristic hump-nose, as to improve the pilot's external field of vision. The fuselage bomb bay of the earlier prototype was eliminated; instead, the entire payload was carried externally on racks fixed onto the underside of the wing's center-section. Various other alterations were made to the wings, including the adoption of more effective slotted ailerons, improved flaps and center-section slots, the latter feature served to smooth the airflow over the tail when flown at high angles of incidence.

During mid-1935, the second prototype was lost in a crash shortly after a take-off conducted at the maximum loading weight, killing the crew on board. The remaining airworthiness tests and service acceptance trials were completed successfully using the third prototype. Further refinements had been incorporated into the third prototype during the test programme to eventually conform with the standards of subsequent production-standard aircraft. Amongst the final changes were the adoption of a Pegasus VIII engine, after which it was used as the development aircraft for the PZL.23B variant of the type.

As a consequence of its favourable flight test programme, the aircraft was approved to enter full-scale production during the second half of 1935. The first series, which was given the designation of PZL.23A, was fitted with a single Bristol Pegasus IIM2 engine, which possessed an upper thrust capability of 670 hp (500 kW) thrust. Early on, the limited availability of the Pegasus engine led to production delays. However, since this engine proved to be unreliable during testing, the final variant, which was designated PZL.23B, was fitted with the newer Pegasus VIII model, which was capable of generating a maximum of 720 hp (537 kW) of thrust.

=== Further development ===
The Bristol engines were licensed for use in Poland only, so for export purposes the Gnome-Rhône engines were used in a variety of PZL designs. A development of the PZL.23 was the PZL.43 light bomber powered by a Gnome-Rhône 14N engine, with significant changes in the fuselage structure compared to its predecessor. The final export variant to be developed was PZL.43A; it was furnished with a single 1,020 hp Gnome-Rhône 14N-01 engine. 52 PZL.43s were made in total, all for Bulgaria only. The new engine improved the aircraft's performance considerably, resulting in the maximum speed being increased to 365 km/h.

During 1936, 40 PZL.23As were produced. Between late 1936 and February 1938, 210 PZL.23Bs were produced with the new engines. They were also known as Karaś A and B or Karaś I and II. All PZL.23s had military numbers from 44.1 to 44.250.Sometimes the aircraft is called the "PZL P.23", but despite an abbreviation P.23 painted on a tail fin, the letter "P" was generally reserved for fighters of Pulawski's design (like PZL P.11). In November 1936, one aircraft was shown at the Paris Air Show, where it was met with interest.

During this period, PZL developed the PZL.46 Sum, a new light bomber, which was partly based on the PZL.23 design. However, only a pair of prototypes were completed during 1938. There was also a single experimental version designated as PZL.42. This version featured a double tail fin configuration and a modified bombardier gondola which was retractable into the fuselage.

== Design ==
The PZL.23 Karaś was a low-wing cantilever monoplane, featuring all-metal, metal-covered construction. The crew of three consisted of a pilot, a bombardier, and a rear gunner. The bombardier's combat station was situated in a gondola underneath the hull, where he could also operate an underbelly machine gun. The pilot was positioned within a fully enclosed air-conditioned and heated cockpit, while the observer was seated directly behind him and could descend into the ventral gondola during applicable parts of a given mission. The fixed undercarriage comprised a pair of cantilever struts and single tail skid, all of which were outfitted with pneumatic shock absorbers built by Czechoslovak company Avia. When prepared for operating from rough or austere airfields, the streamlined fairings over the wheels would have to be removed in advance.

The aircraft were equipped with one of the following engines: Bristol Pegasus IIM2 normal: 570 hp (425 kW), maximum: 670 hp (500 kW) - PZL.23A; Pegasus VIII normal: 650 hp (485 kW), maximum: 720 (537 kW) - PZL.23B. Early Polish-built engines had encountered several common issues, including crankshaft fractures and reduction gears jamming; the original engine manufacturer, Bristol, had not amended the drawings and specifications provided to Poland to incorporate their latest improvements to the Pegasus, which addressed these issues. For the export market, it was outfitted with either the Gnome-Rhône 14K or Gnome-Rhône 14N-01 engines. Regardless of the engine adopted, the aircraft was always outfitted with a two-blade propeller.

One of the more unusual features of the PZL.23 was the design of its three-piece low-mounted wing. In order to produce a wing that was both light and strong, Prauss had opted to use a relatively new wing structure which had been recently designed by Polish engineer Fraciszek Misztal. This wing combined a revolutionary heavy-gauge corrugated duralumin center box and a multi-cellular trailing edge, along with a partially stressed exterior skin composed of duralumin; according to Cynk, it was one of the earliest implementations of a metal sandwich structure in the field of aviation.

The fuselage of the PZL.23 had an oval-section structure, composed of a mixture of duralumin frames and stringers, which were strengthened via several struts on the middle section. The exterior of the fuselage was covered with smooth duralumin sheet, which was internally reinforced in some areas by corrugated sheeting. The rear fuselage featured a semi-monocoque structure. A cantilever structure composed of ribs and spars was used for the tail unit; the fin and tailplane were covered by duralumin sheeting, while the rudder and elevators had finely corrugated exterior surfaces.

The aircraft's offensive payload consisted of bombs. These were carried underneath the wings using racks; the maximum load was 700 kg (1,500 lb) (6 x 100 kg and 2 x 50 kg). While plans to incorporate the Swiatecki bomb-release gear had been mooted, however, they were eliminated from the design during the prototype stage due to disagreements between the Aviation Department and the inventor regarding the manufacturing arrangements. The PZL.23 was also armed with several machine guns, including a defensive ventral gun turret; additional positions, such as a twin-gun mounting on the upper fuselage were considered but never pursued. A typical gun armament included either one or a pair of 7.92 mm fixed guns, along with two single 7.92 mm movable guns.

== Operational history ==
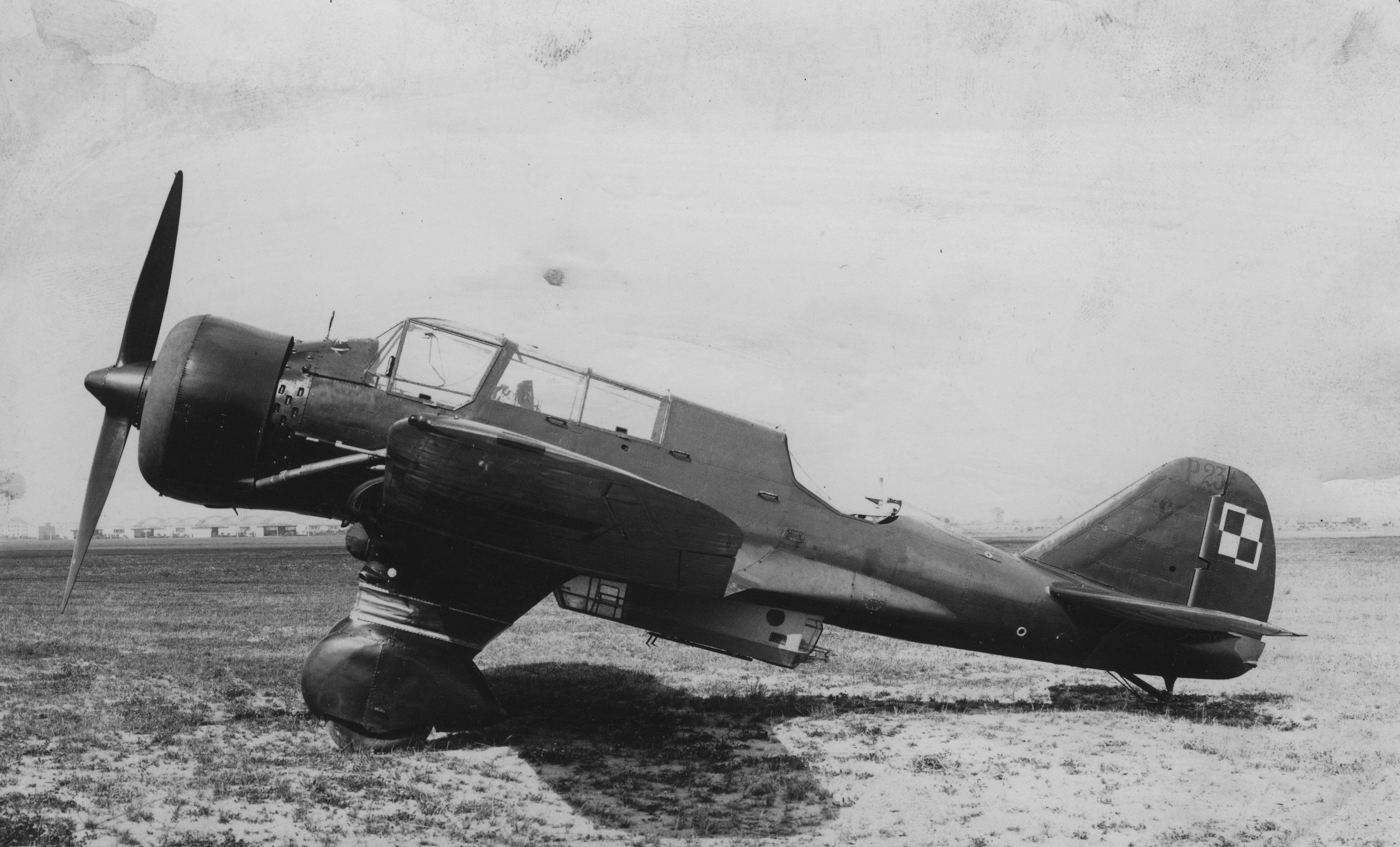
PZL.23A of the production series

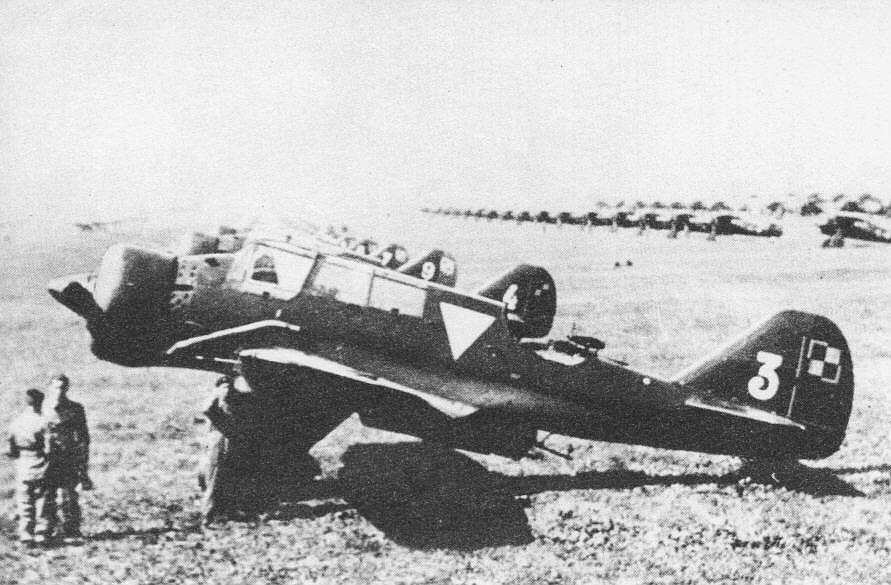
PZL.23A Karaś at the Warsaw Airport. Note lines of PZL P.11 or PZL P.7 fighters in the background

During late 1936, a batch of 40 PZL.23As were delivered to the Polish Air Force. Due to engine faults, these aircraft were initially flown with a limited service ceiling and they were used exclusively in the training role, being fitted with dual controls to fit this usage. From 1937, a total of 210 PZL.23Bs were delivered to the Air Force. Around this time, the type became the main armament of Polish bomber and reconnaissance "line squadrons", having replaced the majority of Breguet 19, Potez 25 and Potez 27 biplanes. By August 1939, there had been 23 reported crashes involving the type, which was deemed to have been an average safety result.

However, due to rapid advances in the field of aviation during the late 1930s, by 1939 the aircraft was considered to be approaching obsolescence. There were increasing questions over the validity of prior air doctrine, leading to a major reorganisation of the PZL.23 squadrons during 1938–1939. The main deficiency of the PZL.23 was its relatively low speed compared to newer aircraft that were then entering service with neighbouring nations. Other issues with the aircraft included a lack of manoeuvrability and unfavourable characteristics when flown at high speeds (the maximum speed of the PZL.23B was 365 km/h, but it was forbidden to exceed 319 km/h due to dangerous flight characteristics). However, at the outbreak of the Second World War on 1 September 1939, with the invasion of Poland, it remained Poland's primary light bomber and reconnaissance aircraft.

During late August 1939, in anticipation of imminent hostilities with Nazi Germany, all Polish combat units were relocated from their peacetime bases to secret combat airfields, so they avoided destruction on the ground. Some PZL.23s were also used in wartime improvised units with 114 PZL.23Bs deployed in combat units (a further 75 PZL.23B and 35 PZL.23A were in air schools, held in reserve or under repair). In total, the PZL.23B were operational with five bomber escadrilles (Eskadra Bombowa) of the Bomber Brigade and seven Army reconnaissance escadrilles, each of which equipped with ten aircraft. In Bomber Brigade there existed also bigger units (Dywizjon Bombowy), consisting of two escadrilles each, and traditionally translated as squadron (two other squadrons of the Bomber Brigade were equipped with the PZL.37 Łoś bomber). In addition, a pair of PZL.43A bombers that had been produced for the Bulgarian order were impressed into Polish service in the 41st Escadrille.

On 2 September 1939, a single PZL.23B of the 21st Escadrille was responsible for the bombing of a factory in Ohlau, inside Germany, the first bombing raid to be conducted against a target within the Third Reich. Over the following days, the PZL.23 bomber squadrons commenced attacks upon several advancing German armoured columns, which were responsible for knocking out as many as thirty per cent of the German ground vehicles. One such high-profile engagement occurred on 3 September 1939. Despite this offensive use of the type, the main task of the Army escadrilles was to perform reconnaissance missions. The five escadrilles of the Bomber Brigade delivered about 52-60 tons of bombs during the campaign, while the Army escadrilles were responsible for the deployment of roughly another dozen tons.

Due to the plane's low speed, light armour and, perhaps most importantly, a lack of supporting protection from friendly fighter aircraft, the PZL.23 suffered heavy combat losses. Many were shot down by German fighter aircraft, but they were also able to fight back and were responsible for shooting down several in return. Despite the lack of protective armour, Polish aircrews often conducted attacks upon German columns while flying at low altitudes, which made their aircraft particularly vulnerable to anti-aircraft fire. Reportedly, around twenty aircraft were lost in crash landings on the improvised and rough airfields. During 1939, around 120 PZL.23s (86 per cent of the Polish Air Force's inventory) were destroyed. However, only 67 of these had been due to direct enemy action. Additionally, only a small number of PZL.23s were destroyed on the ground at various airfields; the only large-scale Luftwaffe success of this type occurred on 14 September, at Hutniki airfield, against the PZL.23Bs of the Bomber Brigade.

During late 1939, at least 21 PZL.23s were evacuated to Romania, of which at least 19 were subsequently used by the Romanian Air Force against the Soviet Union (USSR) during Operation Barbarossa, the costly Axis invasion of the USSR. In addition to Romania's use of the type, a total of 50 PZL.43s and PZL.43As (one pair were delivered by the Germans) were used in Bulgaria for training purposes; the type, which was known by the Bulgarians as the "Chaika", were used in this role until 1946. There are no known PZL.23s survivors of the war.

== Operators ==
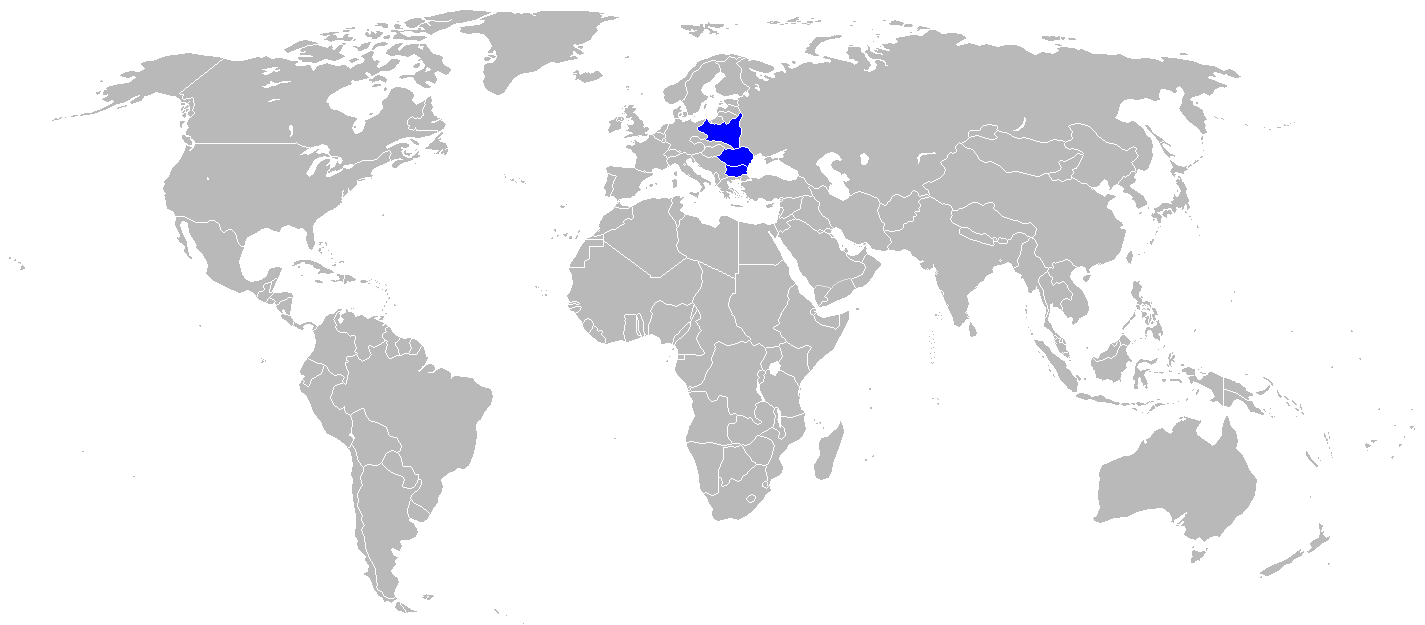
Map showing PZL.23 operators.

Poland

- Polish Air Force

Romania

- Royal Romanian Air Force

Bulgaria

- Bulgarian Air Force

== Specifications (PZL.23B) ==

Data from Polish Aircraft 1893–1939

General characteristics

- Crew: 3: pilot, bomb aimer, rear gunner
- Length: 9.682 m (31 ft 9 in)
- Wingspan: 13.95 m (45 ft 9 in)
- Height: 3.3 m (10 ft 10 in)
- Wing area: 26.8 m^{2} (288 sq ft)
- Empty weight: 1,928 kg (4,251 lb)
- Gross weight: 2,893 kg (6,378 lb) to 3,138 kg (6,918 lb) (reconnaissance mission)

3,495 to 3,526 kg (7,705 to 7,773 lb) (bombing missions)

- Fuel capacity: 740 L (200 US gal; 160 imp gal) in six wing tanks + 30 L (7.9 US gal; 6.6 imp gal) in a gravity feed collector tank in the fuselage; 70 L (18 US gal; 15 imp gal) of engine oil was also carried in a forward fuselage tank
- Powerplant: 1 × P.Z.L. Pegasus IIM2 9-cylinder air-cooled radial piston engines, 440 kW (590 hp) for take-off, rated at 570 hp (430 kW)
- Propellers: 2-bladed Szomański B-17 II/b

Performance

- Maximum speed: 319 km/h (198 mph, 172 kn) at 3,650 m (11,980 ft)

274 km/h (170 mph; 148 kn) at sea level
299 km/h (186 mph; 161 kn) at 2,000 m (6,600 ft)
308 km/h (191 mph; 166 kn) at 5,000 m (16,000 ft)

- Stall speed: 110 km/h (68 mph, 59 kn)
- Range: 1,260 km (780 mi, 680 nmi)
- Service ceiling: 7,300 m (24,000 ft)
- Time to altitude: 2,000 m (6,600 ft) in 4 minutes 45 seconds

4,000 m (13,000 ft) in 15 minutes 10 seconds

- Wing loading: 116 kg/m^{2} (24 lb/sq ft) to 130 kg/m^{2} (27 lb/sq ft)
- Power/mass: 6.3–6.8 kg/kW (10.4–11.2 lb/hp)

Armament

- Guns: 1x fixed forward firing 7,92 KM Wz.33 machine-gun + 2x flexibly mounted 7,92 Vickers F machine guns, one each in dorsal and ventral positions
- Bombs: Up to 700 kg (1,500 lb) of bombs such as:-

2x flares

plus

6x 100 kg (220 lb) high explosive bombs

or

8x 50 kg (110 lb) high explosive bombs

or

24x 12.5 kg (28 lb) fragmentation bombs

Avionics
Polish Philips Works Type N1L/L radio

== See also ==
Related development

- PZL.43
- PZL.46 Sum

Aircraft of comparable role, configuration, and era

- DAR 10
- Fairey Battle
- Heinkel He 70
- Mitsubishi Ki-30
- Neman R-10
- Vultee A-35 Vengeance

Related lists

- List of aircraft of World War II
