= Jerzy Dąbrowski =

Polish aeronautical engineer

Jerzy Dabrowski
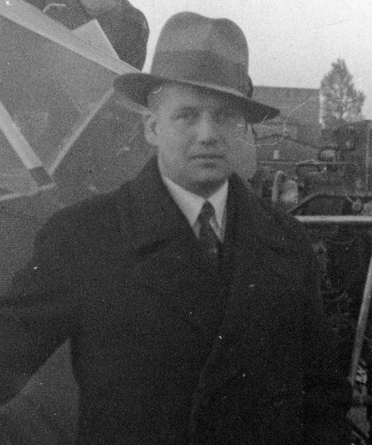
- Born: September 8, 1899; Bełchów, Warsaw Governorate, Congress Poland, Russian Empire
- Died: September 17, 1967 (aged 68); Renton, Washington
- Occupation: Engineer
- Years active: 1921-1967
- Political party: National Democracy

Jerzy Dąbrowski (September 8, 1899 – September 17, 1967) was a Polish aeronautical engineer. He was the lead designer of the famed PZL.37 Łoś medium bomber.

== Biography ==
Dąbrowski was born in Nieborów, west of Warsaw to a railway clerk family. He studied architecture and then transferred to mechanical engineering at the Warsaw Technical University (Polytechnic). The department offered aviation speciality and had an aviation fan club. Dąbrowski designed and built his first aircraft, biplane ultralight D.1 Cykacz (Ticker) in 1924 at the Centralne Warsztaty Lotnicze (Central Aviation Workshops) in Warsaw. In 1925 Dąbrowski obtained a special permission to complete pilot training at the 1st Air Regiment.

Due to financial difficulties, Dąbrowski left the Polytechnic in 1926 and started working at the Plage & Laskiewicz company contributing to the design of the Lublin R.VIII, R.IX. and DUS-III. In 1928 he was asked to join the PZL aviation works in Warsaw. There, with Dr. Franciszek Misztal he designed the all-metal PZL.19 and the PZL.26 for the Challenge 1932 and Challenge 1934 contests.

Dąbrowski's greatest achievement was the design of a very advanced medium bomber PZL.37 Łoś, even though he had not worked on an airplane of this type and size. PZL submitted a proposal in response to the specification issued by the Departament Aeronautyki (Department of Aeronautics) in 1934 for a twin motor bomber capable of carrying a load of 2000 kg (including 300 kg bombs) with speed in excess of 350 km/h and a range of 1200 km. Dąbrowski's preliminary design won an internal PZL contest for the new plane and in the fall of 1934 Dąbrowski became chief engineer of the project. The all-metal aircraft with a large elliptical wing and aerodynamically profiled fuselage had superb flying qualities. The requirement to carry bombs in the wing resulted in the development of an elongated aerodynamic cross-section with excellent qualities, later identified as a laminar flow airfoil. The PZL.37 could carry more than 5000 lb of bombs (2500 kg) over a distance of 900 miles (1500 km) and 2200 lb (1000 kg) over 1400 miles (2200 km - to Moscow and back?), however the Polish Air Force did not have a clear philosophy for the use of such plane. Over 100 were produced by the outbreak of World War II, the last few being the first aircraft manufactured at the new Mielec plant in southern Poland. Only 36 Łoś' were in active bomber units before the Invasion of Poland. A further 18 were in reserve at the Małaszewicze base and a dozen in training. The remainder of the aircraft was being finished slowly at the PZL factories in Warsaw and Mielec, with the main emphasis shifting to the production of fighters. During that time Dąbrowski designed a very promising low-wing fighter with inline engine, PZL.62, but the war prevented its development.

During the World War II Dąbrowski was evacuated to Romania and then to England where he was a technical officer with the Polish Air Force. After the war ended he completed his degree, worked at Percival Aircraft and Folland Aviation. In 1955 he moved to the United States working initially at the Cessna Aircraft Co., then Stanley Aviation and finally Boeing where he specialized in advanced studies. He died while working in Renton, Washington on September 17, 1967.
