= SO3 =

SO3 may refer to

- Sulfur trioxide, SO_{3}, a chemical compound of sulfur and the anhydride of sulfuric acid
- Sulfite, SO^{2−}_{3}, a chemical ion composed of sulfur and oxygen with a 2− charge
- SO(3), the special orthogonal group in 3 dimensions; the rotations that can be given an object in 3-space
- Star Ocean: Till the End of Time, the third main game in the Star Ocean series
- A staff officer of the third class, usually a junior officer
- Special Operations 3 - Planning, of SOE (Special Operations Executive, British, World War II)
- SO3, a TL9000 metric defined as the number of service impact product-attributable outages per NU (normalization unit) per year
- WSK PZL Rzeszów SO-3, a Polish turbojet engine.
