= Polish Air Force =

Aerial warfare branch of Poland's armed forces

- Siły Powietrzne
- Military eagle
- Founded: 1917; 109 years ago (de facto); 1918; 108 years ago (de jure)
- Country: Poland
- Type: Air force
- Role: Aerial warfare
- Size: 16,500 personnel; 261+ aircraft
- Part of: Polish Armed Forces
- March: Marsz Lotników (March of Aviators)
- Engagements: Polish–Ukrainian War; Polish–Soviet War; World War II: Invasion of Poland; Western Front; Eastern Front; War in Iraq; War in Afghanistan; Operation Inherent Resolve
- Website: www.sp.mil.pl

Commanders
- Commander-in-Chief: Karol Nawrocki
- Minister of National Defence: Władysław Kosiniak-Kamysz
- Chief of the General Staff: General Wiesław Kukuła
- General Commander: Generał broni Marek Sokołowski
- Inspector of the Air Force: Generał brygady Ireneusz Nowak

Insignia
- Roundel; (Air Force checkerboard)

- Ceremonial flag

- Garrison flag

Aircraft flown
- Fighter: F-16, F-35, FA-50, MiG-29
- Helicopter: Mi-8, Mi-17, Mi-2, PZL W-3, PZL SW-4, S-70i
- Reconnaissance: PZL M28, TB2, MQ-9, Saab 340
- Trainer: PZL-130, M-346
- Transport: C-130, C295, M28, Boeing 737 BBJ, Gulfstream G550

The Polish Air Force (Polish: Siły Powietrzne, lit. 'Air Forces') is the aerial warfare branch of the Polish Armed Forces. Until July 2004 it was officially known as Wojska Lotnicze i Obrony Powietrznej (lit. 'Aerial and Air Defense Forces'). In 2014 it consisted of roughly 26,000 military personnel and about 475 aircraft, distributed among ten bases throughout Poland.

The Polish Air Force can trace its origins to the second half of 1917 and was officially established in the months following the end of World War I in 1918. During the invasion of Poland by Nazi Germany in 1939, 70% of its aircraft were destroyed. Most pilots, after the Soviet invasion of Poland on 17 September, escaped via Romania and Hungary to continue fighting throughout World War II in allied air forces, first in France, then in Britain, and later also the Soviet Union.

== History ==
=== Origins ===
Military aviation in Poland started before the officially recognised date of regaining independence (11 November 1918). The first independent units of the Polish Air Force were formed in 1917, before World War I had come to an end. When the Russian Revolution began and the tsardom gradually lost control of the country, Polish pilots took advantage of the chaos and formed spontaneous aerial units in areas of present-day Belarus, south Ukraine, and by the Kuban river. Up until that point Polish pilots had only flown as members of Russian, German or Austro-Hungarian militaries. The first known air force units in service to the re-emerging Polish state were: I Polski Oddział Awiacyjny (1st Polish Aviation Squad) in Minsk formed on 19 June 1917, the 1st and 2nd Aviation Units of the 2nd Corps, the aerial fleet of the 4th Rifle Division, as well as the Samodzielny Polski Oddział Awiacyjny (Independent Polish Aviation Squad) in Odesa.

=== Establishment ===
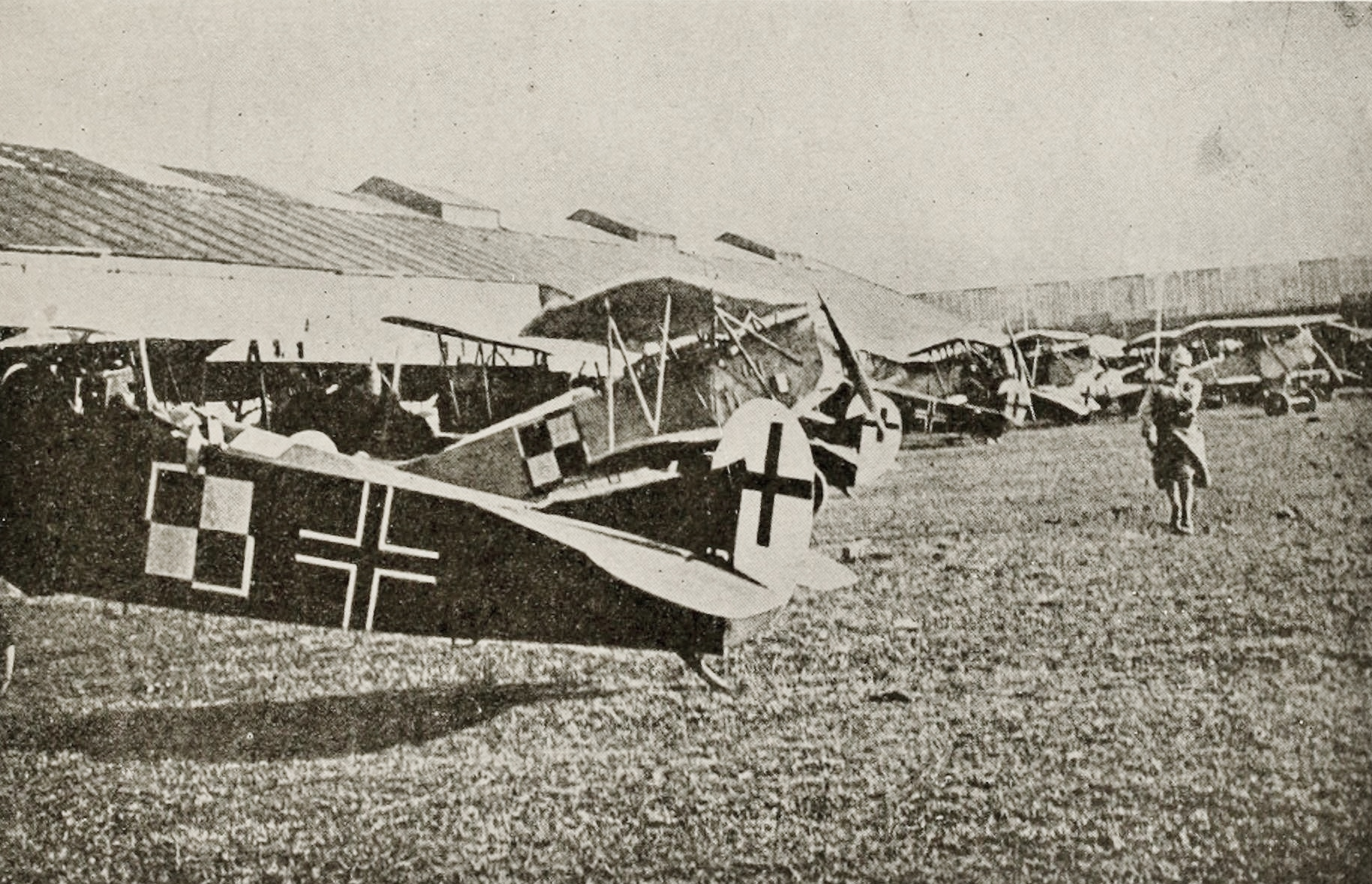
Polish Air Force fighters, 1919

Poland was under German and Austro-Hungarian occupation until the armistice, but the Poles started to take control as the Central Powers collapsed. Initially, the Polish air force consisted of mostly German and Austrian aircraft, left by former occupiers or captured from them, mostly during the Greater Poland Uprising. These planes were first used by the Polish Air Force in the Polish-Ukrainian War in late 1918, during combat operations centered around the city of Lwów (now Lviv). On 2 November 1918 pilot Stefan Bastyr performed the first combat flight of Polish aircraft from Lwów.

When the Polish-Soviet War broke out in February 1920, the Polish Air Force used a variety of former German and Austro-Hungarian, as well as newly acquired western-made Allied aircraft. Most common at that time were light bomber and reconnaissance aircraft, among most numerous were French Breguet 14 bombers, German LVG C.V reconnaissance aircraft, British Bristol F2B scouts and Italian Ansaldo Balilla fighters.

After the Polish-Soviet War ended in 1921, most of the worn out World War I aircraft were gradually withdrawn and from 1924 the air force started to be equipped with new French aircraft. In total in 1918–1924 there were 2160 aircraft in the Polish Air Force and naval aviation (not all in operable condition), in which there were 1384 reconnaissance aircraft and 410 fighters. From 1924 to 1930 the primary fighter of the Polish Air Force was the SPAD 61 and its main bombers were the French produced Potez 15 and the Potez 25, which was eventually manufactured in Poland under license from Aéroplanes Henry Potez.

The first Polish-designed and mass-produced aircraft to serve in the country's air force was a high wing fighter, the PWS-10, first manufactured in 1930 by the Podlasie Aircraft Factory.

=== Inter-war years ===
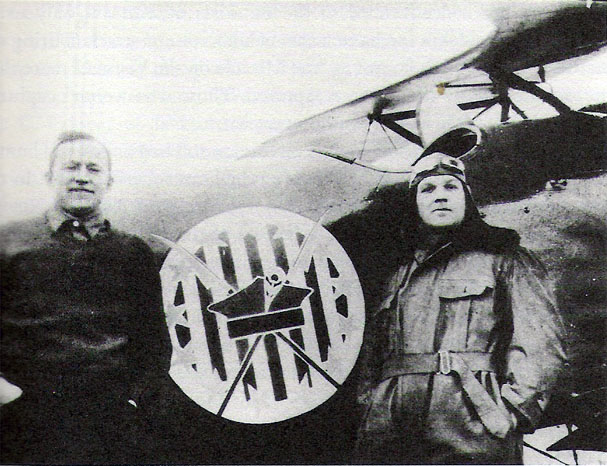
American volunteers, Merian C. Cooper and Cedric Fauntleroy, fighting in the Polish Air Force as part of the Polish 7th Air Escadrille, known as the "Kościuszko Squadron", 1920

In 1933, Zygmunt Pulawski's first high wing, all-metal aircraft, the PZL P.7a, was designed and produced, with 150 entering service. The design was followed by 30 improved PZL P.11a aircraft and a final design, the PZL P.11c, was delivered in 1935 and was a respectable fighter for its time; 175 entered service and it remained the only Polish fighter until 1939, by which time foreign aircraft design had overtaken it. Its final version, the PZL P.24, was built for export only and was bought by four countries. A new fighter prototype, the PZL.50 Jastrząb (Hawk), similar to the Seversky P-35 in layout, was curtailed by the Nazi invasion and the PZL.38 Wilk twin-engine heavy fighter remained a prototype.

As far as bombers are concerned, the Potez 25 and Breguet 19 were replaced by an all-metal monoplane, the PZL.23 Karaś, with 250 built from 1936 onwards, but by 1939 the Karas was outdated. In 1938 the Polish factory PZL designed a modern twin-engine medium bomber, the PZL.37 Łoś (Elk). The Łoś had a bomb payload of 2580 kg and a top speed of 439 km/h. Unfortunately, only about 30 Łoś A bombers (single tailfin) and 70 Łoś B (twin tailfin) bombers had been delivered before the Nazi invasion.

As an observation and close reconnaissance plane, Polish escadres used the slow and easily damaged Lublin R-XIII, and later the RWD-14 Czapla. Polish naval aviation used the Lublin R-XIII on floats. Just before the war, some Italian torpedo planes, the CANT Z.506, were ordered, but only one was delivered, and it was without armament. The principal aircraft used to train pilots were the Polish-built high-wing RWD-8 and the PWS-26 biplane. In 1939, Poland ordered 160 MS-406s and 10 Hawker Hurricane fighters from abroad, but they were not delivered before the outbreak of the war.

=== 1939 ===
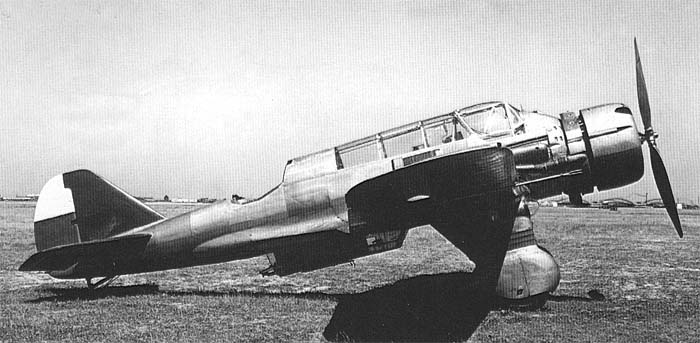
A PZL.43 light bomber

On 1 September 1939, at the beginning of the invasion of Poland, all Polish combat aircraft had been dispersed to secondary airfields, contrary to a commonly held belief, based on German propaganda, that they had all been destroyed by bombing at their airbases. The aircraft destroyed by German bombers on the airfields were mostly trainers. The fighters were grouped into 15 escadres; five of them constituted the Pursuit Brigade, deployed in the Warsaw area. Despite being obsolete, Polish PZL P.11 fighters shot down over 170 German aircraft. The bombers, grouped in nine escadres of the Bomber Brigade, attacked armoured ground columns but suffered heavy losses. Seven reconnaissance- and 12 observation escadres, deployed to particular armies, were used primarily for reconnaissance. Part of the Polish Air Force was destroyed in the campaign; the surviving aircraft were either captured or withdrawn to Romania, Hungary, Lithuania, Latvia, Slovenia or Sweden, whose air forces subsequently employed these aircraft for their own use (in the case of Romania until 1956). A great number of pilots and aircrew managed to escape to France and then to Britain, where they played a significant part in the defence of the United Kingdom against Nazi invasion, during the Battle of Britain. Prior to the conflict Poland also bought 234 planes abroad. The first of them were on delivery when the conflict started. These were the Hawker Hurricane (14 planes), Morane-Saulnier 406 (120 planes) and Fairey Battle (100 planes). The ship SS Lassell with 14 Hawker Hurricanes on board left Liverpool on 28 August 1939; deliveries from France were also on the way when the conflict broke out.

=== Strength of Polish Air Force on 1 September 1939 ===
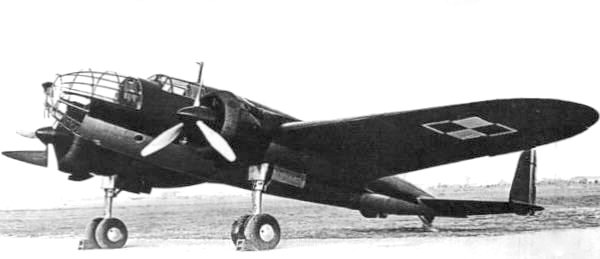
PZL.37 Łoś medium bomber

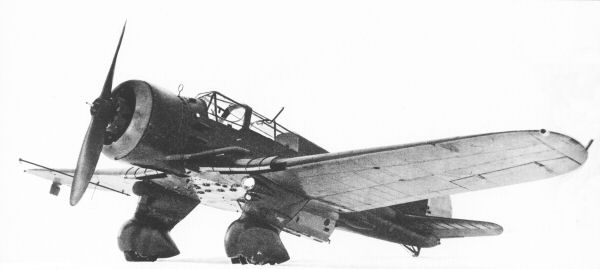
PZL.23 Karaś light bomber and reconnaissance aircraft

Aircraft	Origin	Type	Variant	In service	Notes
Combat aircraft
PZL P.11	Poland	Fighter		175	Combat formations consisted of 140
PZL P.7	Poland	Fighter		105	Combat formations consisted of 30
PZL.23A	Poland	Light bomber		35	
PZL.23B	Poland	Light bomber		170	Combat formations consisted of 120
PZL.43	Poland	Light bomber		6	Combat formations consisted of 6
PZL.46 Sum	Poland	Light bomber		2	Combat formations consisted of 1
PZL.37 Łoś	Poland	Medium bomber		86	Combat formations consisted of 36
LWS-6 Żubr	Poland	Medium bomber		15	
Surveillance
Lublin R XIII	Poland	Spotter		150	Combat formations consisted of 55
RWD-14 Czapla	Poland	Reconnaissance		60	Combat formations consisted of 40
RWD 8	Poland	Reconnaissance		550	Combat formations consisted of 20
PWS-16	Poland	Reconnaissance / Trainer		15	Combat formations consisted of 15

=== 1940 (France) ===
The emblem of the No. 302 Polish Fighter Squadron featuring the designation of the GC I/145

The emblem of the No. 303 Squadron RAF

After the fall of Poland, the Polish Air Force started to regroup in France. The only complete unit created before the German attack on France was the GC I/145 fighter squadron, flying Caudron C.714 light fighters. It was the only unit operating the C.714 at the time. The Polish pilots were also deployed to various French squadrons, flying on all types of French fighters, but mostly on the MS-406. After the surrender of France, many of these pilots managed to escape to Britain to continue the fight against the Luftwaffe.

=== 1940–1947 (United Kingdom) ===
Following the fall of France in 1940, Polish units were formed in the United Kingdom, as a part of the Royal Air Force and known as the Polish Air Force (PAF). Four Polish squadrons were formed:

- 300 Squadron and 301 Squadron flew bombers,
- 302 Squadron and 303 Squadron flew Hawker Hurricane fighters.

The two Polish fighter squadrons first saw action during the third phase of the Battle of Britain in August 1940, with much success; with many of the pilots being experienced and battle-hardened during the Invasion of Poland. The pilots were regarded as fearless, often bordering on reckless. However, success rates for these squadrons were often greater in comparison to UK and Commonwealth squadrons, with the 303 Squadron becoming the most efficient RAF fighter squadron at that time. Many Polish pilots also flew individually in other RAF squadrons.

As World War II progressed, a further twelve Polish squadrons were created in the United Kingdom:

- No. 304 Polish Bomber Squadron (bomber, then RAF Coastal Command),
- No. 305 Polish Bomber Squadron (bomber),
- No. 306 Polish Fighter Squadron (fighter),
- No. 307 Polish Night Fighter Squadron (night fighter),
- No. 308 Polish Fighter Squadron (fighter),
- No. 309 Polish Fighter-Reconnaissance Squadron (reconnaissance, then fighter),
- No. 315 Polish Fighter Squadron (fighter),
- No. 316 Polish Fighter Squadron (fighter),
- No. 317 Polish Fighter Squadron (fighter),
- No. 318 Polish Fighter-Reconnaissance Squadron (fighter-reconnaissance),
- No. 663 Polish Air Observation Post Squadron (air observation/artillery spotting),
- and the Polish Fighting Team also known as "Skalski's Circus", attached to 145 Squadron RAF.

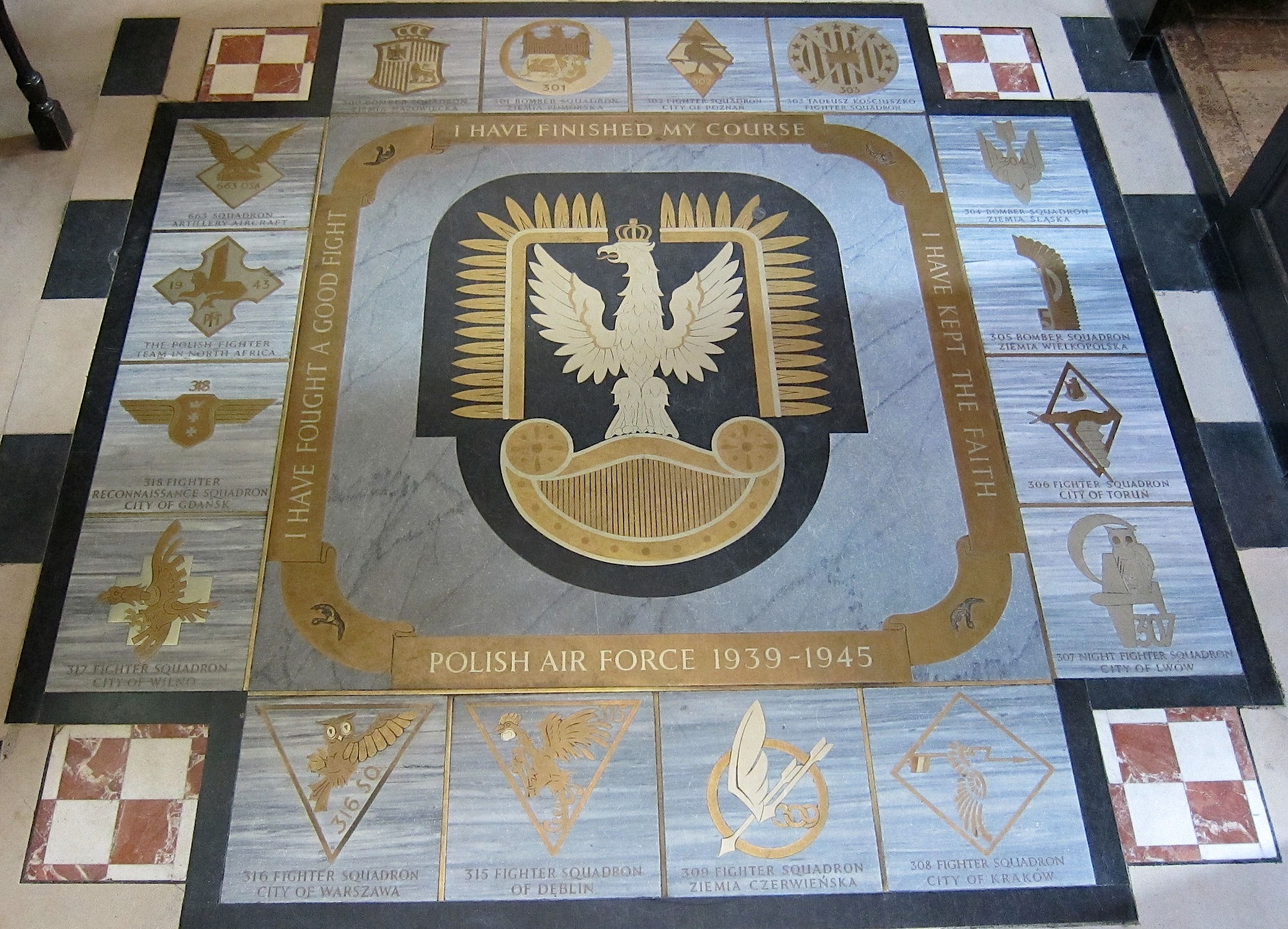
The Polish squadrons in the RAF memorial at St Clement Danes church in London

The fighter squadrons initially flew Hurricanes, then switched to Supermarine Spitfires, and eventually to North American Mustangs. 307 Squadron, like other night fighter squadrons (such as 410 Squadron Royal Canadian Air Force), flew Boulton Paul Defiants, Bristol Beaufighters and finally de Havilland Mosquitoes. The bomber squadrons were initially equipped with Fairey Battles and Vickers Wellingtons. 300 Squadron was later assigned Avro Lancasters, 301 Squadron Handley Page Halifaxes and Consolidated Liberators and 305 Squadron, de Havilland Mosquitoes and North American Mitchells. 663 Squadron (air observation/artillery spotting) flew Taylorcraft Auster IIIs and Vs. After the war, all equipment was returned to the British, but only some of the pilots and crews actually returned to Poland, with many settling in the United Kingdom, some of whom returned to Poland in 1989 after the fall of communism.

=== 1943–1945 (Soviet Union) ===
Along with the Polish People's Army (Ludowe Wojsko Polskie) in the USSR, the Polish People's Air Force (Ludowe Lotnictwo Polskie) was created, in defence of the Soviet Union against Nazi invasion. Three regiments were formed in late 1943:

- the 1st Fighter Regiment "Warszawa", (equipped with Yak-1 and Yak-9 aircraft),
- the 2nd Night Bomber Regiment "Kraków" (flying Polikarpov Po-2 aircraft – produced in Poland as the CSS-13 from 1949 onwards),
- and the 3rd Assault Regiment (flying Ilyushin Il-2 aircraft) were formed.

During 1944–5, further regiments were created, coming together to form the 1st Mixed Air Corps, consisting of a bomber division, an assault division, a fighter division and a mixed division. After the war, these returned to Poland and gave birth to the air force of the People's Republic of Poland.

=== 1949–1989 ===
In 1949, the Li-2sb transport aircraft was adapted into a bomber and in 1950, Poland received Petlyakov Pe-2 and Tupolev Tu-2 bombers from the Soviet Union along with USB-1 and USB-2 training bombers. In 1950 also, the Yak-17 fighter came into service, as did the Ilyushin Il-12 transport and the Yak-18 trainer. From 1951 onwards, the Polish Air Force was equipped with Yak-23 jet fighters and MiG-15 jets, along with a training version, the MiG-15 UTI, and later, in 1961, the MiG-17.

As well as Soviet-produced aircraft, from 1952 onwards Soviet MiG-15 and later MiG-17 fighters were produced under licence in Poland as the Lim-1, Lim-2 and later the Lim-5. A domestic ground attack variant of the Lim-5M was developed as the Lim-6bis in 1964. The only jet bomber used by the Polish Air Force during this period was the Ilyushin Il-28, from 1952 onwards. Poland used only a small number of MiG-19s from 1959, in favour of the MiG-21 from 1963 onwards, which became its main supersonic fighter. This aircraft was used in numerous variants from MiG-21F-13, through MiG-21PF and MF to MiG-21bis. Later, the Polish Air Force received 37 MiG-23s (1979) and 12 MiG-29s (1989).

The main fighter-bomber and ground attack aircraft after 1949 was the Il-10 (a training version, the UIl-10, entering service in 1951). From 1965 onwards, Poland also used a substantial number of Su-7Bs for bombing and ground attack, replaced with 27 Sukhoi Su-20s in 1974 and 110 Sukhoi Su-22s in 1984.

Propeller-driven training aircraft, the Junak-2 (in service since 1952), the TS-9 Junak-3 (in service since 1954) and the PZL TS-8 Bies (since 1958) were later replaced by a jet trainer, the domestically built TS-11 Iskra. Another Polish jet trainer, the PZL I-22 Iryda, was used for some time but, because of continuing problems, all machines were returned to PZL for modification and did not resume service. The Yak-12 was used as a multirole aircraft from 1951, the An-2 from 1955 and subsequently the Wilga-35 P.

Transport aircraft used by the Polish Air Force during this period included: the Il-14 (first in service in 1955), the Il-18 (first in service in 1961), the An-12B (first in service in 1966), the An-26 (first in service in 1972), the Yak-40 (first in service in 1973) and the Tupolev Tu-154. A number of helicopters were used by the Polish Army: the SM-1 (a Mil Mi-1 manufactured under licence), which was a multirole helicopter, in operation since 1956; the Mil Mi-4, multirole, since 1958; the PZL SM-2, multirole, since 1960; the Mil Mi-2 and Mil Mi-8 (later also Mil Mi-17), multirole, since 1968 and the Mil Mi-24, a combat helicopter, since 1976. Also the Mil Mi-14, an amphibious helicopter, and the Mil Mi-6, both used as transports.

In 1954, the Polish Air Force was merged with the Air Defence Force, creating the Air and Country Air Defence Forces (Wojska Lotnicze i Obrony Przeciwlotniczej Obszaru Kraju – WLiOPL OK), a military organisation composed of both flying and anti-aircraft units. In 1962, the WLiOPL OK were separated back again into their two original component bodies: the Air Force (Wojska Lotnicze) and the Country Air Defence Force (Wojska Obrony Powietrznej Kraju).

=== Present-day operations ===
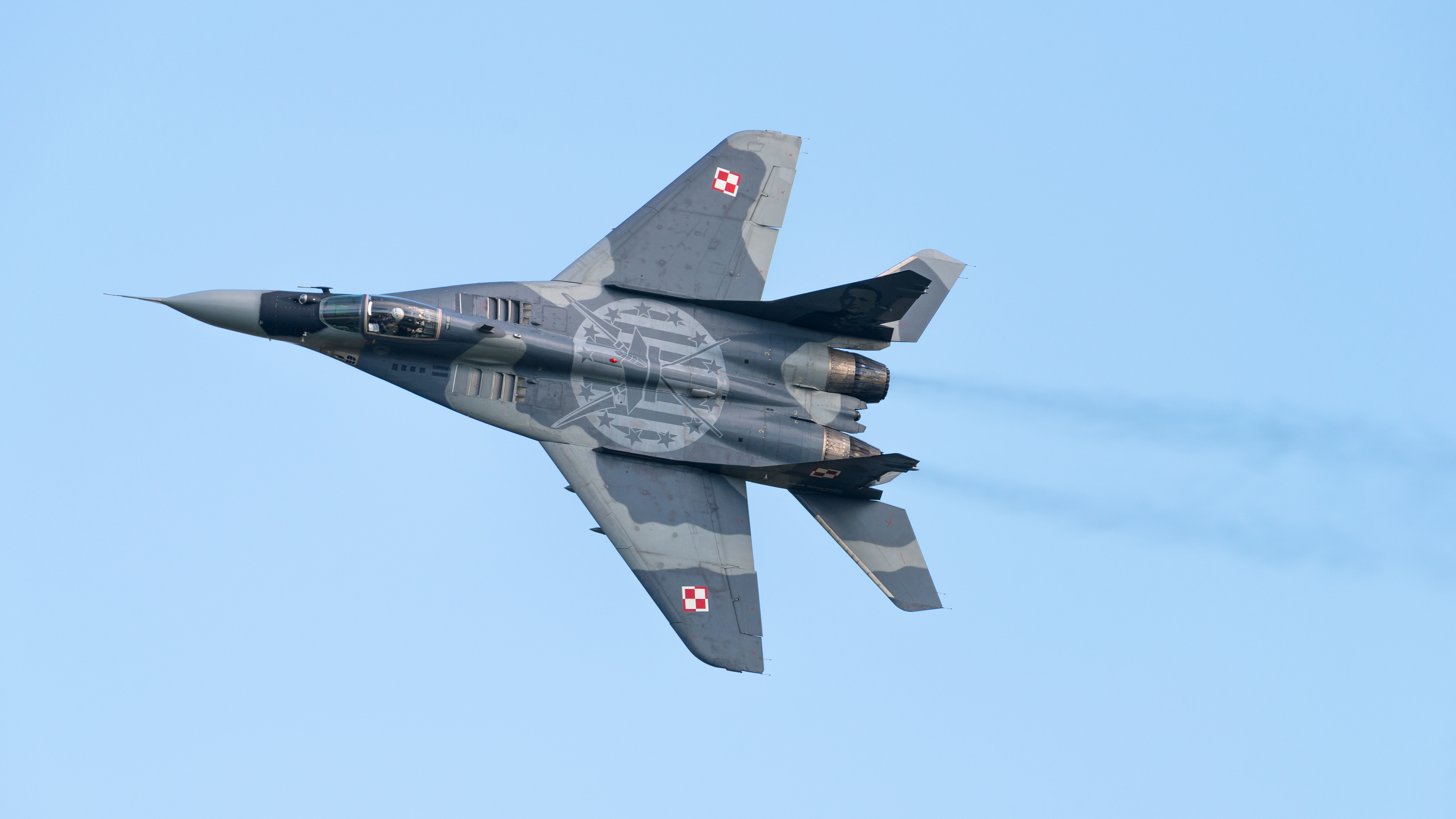
Polish Air Force Mikoyan MiG-29A at ILA Berlin Air Show, 2016

After political upheaval and the collapse of the Soviet Union in 1991, and a consequent reduction in the state of military anxiety in the whole of Europe during the 1990s and early 2000s, the Polish Air Force saw reductions in size. On 1 July 1990 the Polish Air Force and the Air Defence Force were merged again (Wojska Lotnicze i Obrony Powietrznej – WLiOP or WLOP). The attack capability of this force consisted primarily of MiG-21s, MiG-23s, MiG-29s, Su-20s and Su-22s. The remaining Lim-6bis were withdrawn in the early 1990s, followed soon afterwards by the withdrawal of the remaining Su-20 aircraft. The small number of remaining MiG-23s were withdrawn by 1999. Throughout the 1990s, Poland did not purchase any new combat aircraft and only managed to acquire further MiG-29s, from the Czech Republic in 1995 and from Germany in 2004. MiG-21s were fully withdrawn from service in 2003. In 2004, the only remaining combat aircraft flown by the WLiOP were the MiG-29 and the Su-22. As of 2010, the fleet of Su-22s is in need of modernization to retain any value as a combat aircraft and its future is unclear.

In 2002, the F-16C/D Block 52+ from the American company Lockheed Martin was chosen as a new multirole fighter for the WLiOP, the first deliveries taking place in November 2006 and continued until 2008 under Peace Sky program. As of 2011 the Polish Air Force has three squadrons of F-16s: two stationed at the 31st Tactical Air Base near Poznań and the 10th Tactical Squadron at the 32nd Air Base near Łask. The acquisition of the US F-16 was not without fierce competition from European aerospace companies; the sale was hotly pursued by the French company Dassault, with their Mirage 2000 and by the Swedish company Saab, with the JAS 39 Gripen. The Polish Block 52+ F-16s are equipped with the latest Pratt and Whitney F-100-229 afterburning turbofan engines, and the avionics suite includes the APG-68(V)9 terrain mapping radar system and the ALQ-211(V)4 electronic warfare suite. All Polish F-16s can carry modern US precision ordnance, ranging from the JDAM/JSOW to the latest in export-certificate-authorized air-to-air weaponry (including the AIM-120C-5 and AIM-9X).

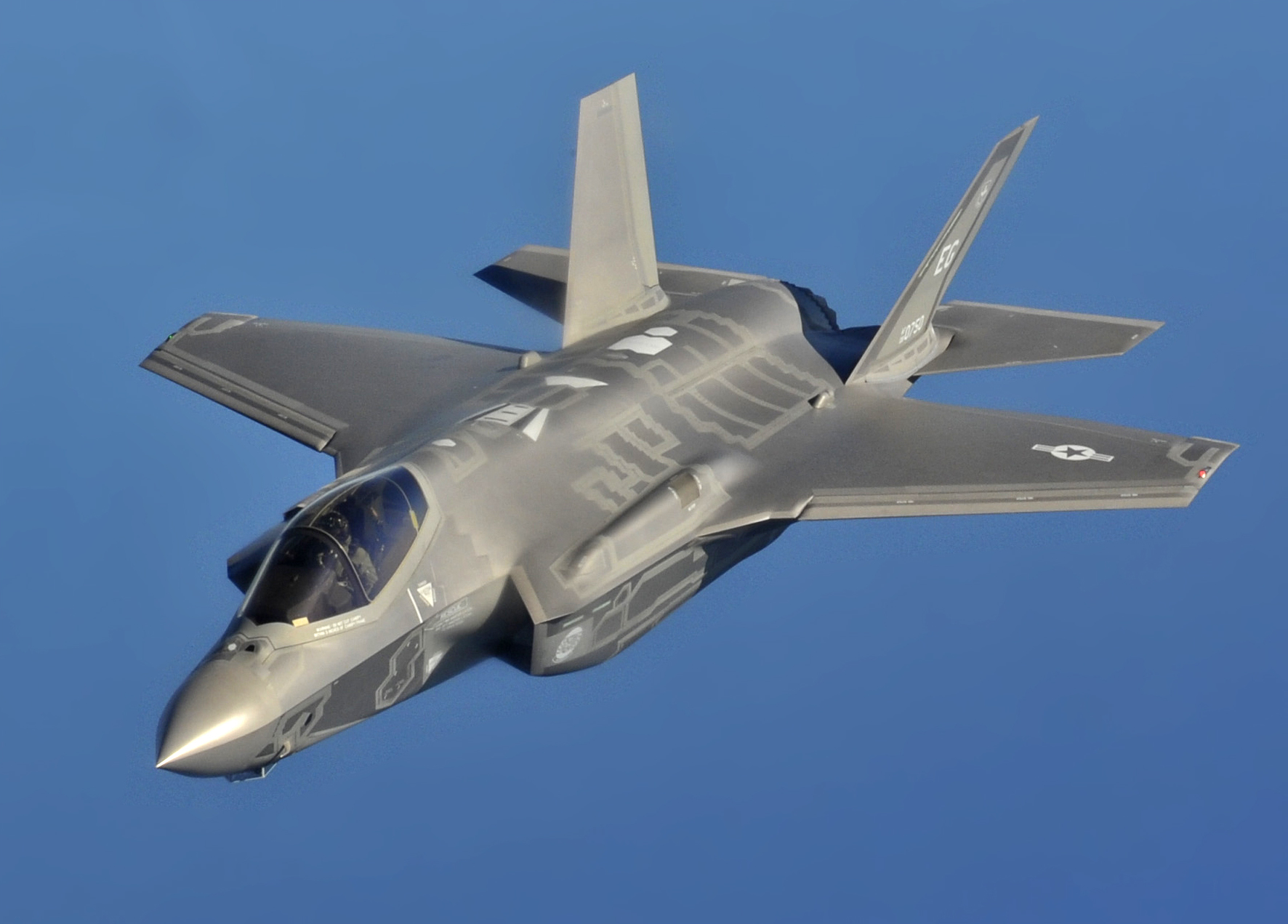
In 2020, Poland placed an order for 32 F-35A Lightning II fighters (pictured in USAF livery)

In the aftermath of the presidential Tu-154 crash in 2010 and later Polish-led investigation, the 36th Special Aviation Regiment, responsible for transporting the President and the Polish Government, was disbanded, while the defense minister resigned. A new unit, the 1st Air Base, replaced the 36th regiment. Between June 2010 and December 2017 most official flights were served by two leased Embraer E-175 operated by LOT Polish Airlines. On 14 November 2016 the Defense Ministry ordered two Gulfstream G550 VIP planes. On 31 March 2017 a deal with Boeing Company was signed to supply two Boeing Business Jet 2 and one Boeing 737-800 for the head of state and the government transport.

On 27 February 2014 Poland signed a €280 million contract with Alenia Aermacchi for 8 M-346 Master advanced training jets. The first two Masters arrived in Poland accompanied by Team Iskry on 14 November 2016.

On 11 December 2014 Polish officials signed a contract with the United States for the purchase of 70 AGM-158 Joint Air to Surface Stand off Missiles, for US$250 million. Also contained in the contract are upgrades to the fleet of Polish F-16s to be completed by Lockheed Martin.

On 28 May 2019, the Polish Minister of Defence announced that Poland had sent a request for quotation for the acquisition of 32 F-35A aircraft. On 11 September 2019, the Department of Defense Security Cooperation Agency announced that Poland had been cleared to purchase 32 F-35A fighters, along with associated equipment, for an estimated cost of $6.5 billion. On 27 September 2019 the US Congress approved the sale. On 31 January 2020, Poland signed a $4.6 billion deal for 32 F-35A fighters.

On 8 March 2022, the Polish government offered to transfer its entire MiG-29 fleet to the US government via Ramstein Air Base as lethal aid to the Ukrainian air force against the ongoing Russian invasion in return for aircraft of corresponding operational capabilities (most likely F-16s). The exchange was eventually not carried out. As of 2025, it was planned to decommission the remaining MiG-29s as they reach their certified flight hours. Polish Minister of National Defense Władysław Kosiniak-Kamysz suggested that the cancelled transfer had been influenced by historical disputes with Ukraine.

Lockheed Martin F-35 Husarz

On 22 May 2026, the first batch of F-35PL Husarz arrived at the 32nd Air Base in Łask, marking the first country on the Eastern Flank of NATO to operate the stealth aircraft. The aircraft were officially unveiled in an inaugural flyover in the following month. The aircraft are planned to replace the aging MiG-29 fleet in service.

In October 2026, Rzeczpospolita reported that while the Polish Air Force was taking delivery of modern aircraft, the service was suffering from a shortage of trained personnel. In particular, it was stated that for the forty seven F-16 in service, there were approximately forty pilots available. Inefficiencies in the training process at Dęblin, as well as operational conversion training needing to take place in the United States, with limited positions available were cited. Ukrainian pilots undergoing training on the F-16 were reportedly facing similar bottlenecks in training. This was exacerbated by the transition of several F-16 pilots to the new F-35 stealth fighter. Rzeczpospolita stated that this was another example of the Ministry of National Defence acquiring equipment without adequate operational or personnel support.

== Equipment ==
=== Aircraft ===
Aircraft	Image	Origin	Type	Variant	In service	Notes
Combat aircraft
F-35 Lightning II		United States	Stealth multirole	F-35A	21/32	32 ordered. Possible orders for another 32 aircraft . 10 at 32nd Tactical Aviation Base in Łask.
F-16 Fighting Falcon		United States	Multirole	F-16C/D	47	Known in Polish service as the Jastrząb (Hawk). 48 ordered; 1 destroyed in an accident. Entire fleet will be upgraded to F-16V Block 72 standard between 2028 and 2038.
KAI FA-50		South Korea	Light multirole	FA-50GF	12	36 PL variants on order
Mikoyan MiG-29		Soviet Union	Multirole	MiG-29A/UB	10	As of 2027, planned to decommission as they reach certified flight hours.
AEW&C
Saab 340		Sweden	AEW&C	Saab 340 AEW&C	2	Erieye system
Transport
Boeing 737		United States	VIP transport	800	1	
Boeing 737		United States	VIP transport	BBJ2	2	
Gulfstream G550		United States	VIP transport		2	
C-130 Hercules		United States	Tactical airlifter	C-130E	1	
C-130 Hercules		United States	Tactical airlifter	C-130H	5	
Airbus C295		Spain	Transport		16	
PZL M28 Skytruck		Poland	Transport		24	
Helicopters
Mil Mi-8		Soviet Union	Utility	Mi-8/17	11	
PZL Mi-2		Poland	Liaison		17	
PZL W-3 Sokół		Poland	Utility		12	
Trainer aircraft
Alenia M-346		Italy	Advanced trainer		15	
Diamond DA42		Austria	Multi engine trainer		5	
PZL-130 Orlik		Poland	Trainer		28	
PZL SW-4		Poland	Rotorcraft trainer		23	
Guimbal Cabri G2		France	Rotorcraft trainer		6	
Robinson R44		United States	Rotorcraft trainer		4	
Unmanned aerial vehicles
MQ-9 Reaper		United States	UCAV	MQ-9A	—	Leasing undisclosed number4
MQ-9 Reaper		United States	UCAV	MQ-9B	0	3 on order
Bayraktar TB2		Turkey	UCAV		24	

Note: Three C-17 Globemaster IIIs are available through the Heavy Airlift Wing based in Hungary.

=== Air defence ===
Name	Image	Origin	Type	In service	Notes
MIM-104F Patriot		United States	HIMAD	2 batteries	6 batteries on order. Utilizes IBCS.
NAREW		Poland; United Kingdom	SHORAD	6 launchers	100 on order
PSR-A Pilica		Poland	VSHORAD	6 batteries	22 batteries on order
PPZR Grom		Poland	MANPADS		used by PSR-A Pilica
PPZR Piorun		Poland	MANPADS		used by PSR-A Pilica
S-125 Neva		Soviet Union	Mobile Surface-to-air artillery system	51 units	

=== Radars ===
The 3rd Wrocław Radio Engineering Brigade has several radar types under its command including the Italian made RAT-31DL an AESA system, the Polish made NUR-15 radar which provides a 3D picture of the controlled airspace, and the mobile unit NUR-31 - employing a medium-range airspace control radar.

== Structure ==
Polish Air Force locations in 2026:
MiG-29A/UB F-16C/D 52+ F-35A & F-16C/D 52+ FA-50GF other flying units
Air Defense Missile unit
Radar unit
NUR-12M long-range radar stations
RAT-31DL long-range radar stations
Command and Control Centre
Other units

=== Armed Forces General Command ===
- Armed Forces General Command, in Warsaw
  - 1st Tactical Air Wing, in Świdwin
    - 12th Unmanned Aerial Vehicles Base, Mirosławiec, with Bayraktar TB2 and MQ-9 Reaper
    - 21st Tactical Air Base, in Świdwin, currently without aircraft (SU-22 are no longer in service,to be replaced by F-35A)
    - 22nd Tactical Air Base, in Malbork, with MiG-29 (to be replaced by FA-50GF)
    - 23rd Tactical Air Base, in Mińsk Mazowiecki, with FA-50GF
  - 2nd Tactical Air Wing, in Poznań
    - 31st Tactical Air Base, in Poznań, with F-16C/D 52+
    - 32nd Tactical Air Base, in Łask, with F-16C/D 52+ and F-35A
    - 16th Airfield Repair Battalion, in Jarocin
  - 3rd Transport Air Wing, in Powidz
    - 8th Transport Air Base, at Kraków Air Base, with CASA C-295M and M28B Skytruck
    - 33rd Transport Air Base, in Powidz, with C-130E/H Hercules
    - Air Special Operations Unit, in Powidz, with Mi-17 and S-70i (operationally assigned to the Polish Special Forces)
    - 1st Search and Rescue Group, in Świdwin, with W-3 Sokół
    - 2nd Search and Rescue Group, in Mińsk Mazowiecki, with W-3 Sokół
    - 3rd Search and Rescue Group, in Kraków, with W-3 Sokół
  - 4th Training Air Wing, in Dęblin
    - 41st Training Air Base, in Dęblin, with M-346A Master, SW-4 Puszczyk and Mi-2
    - 42nd Training Air Base, in Radom, with PZL-130 Orlik
    - Military Training and Fitness Center Zakopane, in Zakopane
    - High Altitude Rescue and Parachute Training Center, in Poznań
  - 3rd Air Defense Missile Brigade "Warsaw", in Sochaczew
    - 32nd Air Defense Missile Battalion, in Olszewnica Stara, with S-125 Neva SC
    - 33rd Air Defense Missile Battalion, in Gdynia, with S-125 Neva SC
    - 34th Air Defense Missile Battalion, in Bytom, with S-125 Neva SC
    - 35th Air Defense Missile Battalion, in Skwierzyna, with S-125 Neva SC
    - 36th Air Defense Missile Battalion, in Mrzeżyno, with S-125 Neva SC
    - 37th Air Defense Missile Battalion, in Bielice, with Patriot PAC-3
    - 38th Air Defense Support Battalion, in Bielice
  - 3rd Radiotechnical Brigade, in Wrocław (Air space surveillance)
    - 3rd Radiotechnical Battalion "Sandomierz", in Sandomierz
      - 110th Long Range Radiolocating Post, in Łabunie, with RAT-31DL
      - 360th Long Range Radiolocating Post, in Brzoskwinia, with NUR-12M
      - 2× Airfield area control stations, with AVIA-W radars
      - 3× Radiotechnical companies
      - Logistic Company
    - 8th Radiotechnical Battalion "Szczytno", in Lipowiec
      - 144th Long Range Radiolocating Post, in Roskosz, with NUR-12M
      - 184th Long Range Radiolocating Post, in Szypliszki, with RAT-31DL
      - 211th Long Range Radiolocating Post, in Chruściel, with RAT-31DL
      - 5× Radiotechnical companies
      - Logistic Company
    - 31st Radiotechnical Battalion "Dolnośląskie", in Wrocław
      - 170th Long Range Radiolocating Post, in Wronowice, with NUR-12M
      - 4× Radiotechnical companies
      - 3× Airfield area control stations, with AVIA-W radars
      - Logistic Company
    - 34th Radiotechnical Battalion "Chojnice", in Chojnice
      - 5× Radiotechnical companies
      - 2× Airfield area control stations, with AVIA-W radars
      - Logistic Company
  - 1st Transport Air Base, at Warsaw Chopin Airport, with Gulfstream G550, Boeing 737-800 and W-3 Sokół (Government transport)
  - Radio-Electronic Warfare Reconnaissance and Support Center, in Grójec
  - Polish Armed Forces Hydrometeorological Service, in Warsaw
  - Polish Armed Forces Air Traffic Service, in Warsaw
  - Air Force Training Center, in Koszalin
  - Aeronautical Engineering Training Center, in Dęblin
  - Air Force Main Training Range, in Ustka
  - 21st Air Force Training Range, in Nadarzyce
  - 6th Air Force Chemical Battalion, in Śrem (CBRN defense)

=== Armed Forces Operational Command ===
Armed Forces Operational Command, in Warsaw

- Air Operations Centre – Air Component Command, in Warsaw-Pyry, reports to NATO's Integrated Air Defense System CAOC Uedem in Germany
  - Mobile Air Operations Command Unit, in Babki
  - 22nd Command and Control Centre, in Osówiec
  - 32nd Command and Control Centre, at Kraków-Balice Air Base
  - 1st Air Operations Coordination Centre, in Gdynia
  - 2nd Air Operations Coordination Centre, in Kraków
  - 4th Air Operations Coordination Centre, in Szczecin

== Ranks and insignia ==
Officers

NATO code	OF-10	OF-9	OF-8	OF-7	OF-6	OF-5	OF-4	OF-3	OF-2	OF-1
Polish Air Force
Polish Air Force	Marszałek Polski	Generał	Generał broni	Generał dywizji	Generał brygady	Pułkownik	Podpułkownik	Major	Kapitan	Porucznik	Podporucznik

Other ranks

NATO code	OR-9		OR-8	OR-7	OR-6	OR-5	OR-4	OR-3		OR-2	OR-1
Polish Air Force
Polish Air Force	Starszy chorąży sztabowy	Starszy chorąży	Chorąży		Młodszy chorąży	Starszy sierżant	Sierżant	Plutonowy	Starszy kapral	Kapral	Starszy szeregowy	Szeregowy

=== Qualification badges ===
The current aviator badge of the Polish Air Force has been in use since the 1920s. The badge is called gapa and represents silver eagle in flight with gold laurel wreath in the bill. Navigator/Observer badge (below) represents the same eagle, but in gold with added lightning bolts. The gapa is worn in the usual place on the upper left breast above the pocket, but unlike other air forces it is suspended on a chain. It adorned the uniform of Polish Air Force officers in the RAF during World War II along with their RAF wings. In the combat version (for at least 7 flights in combat conditions) the badge has a green laurel wreath.

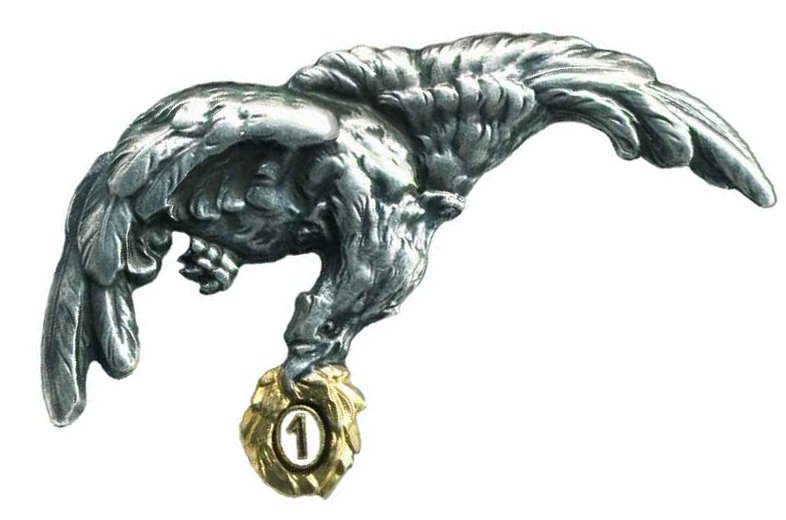
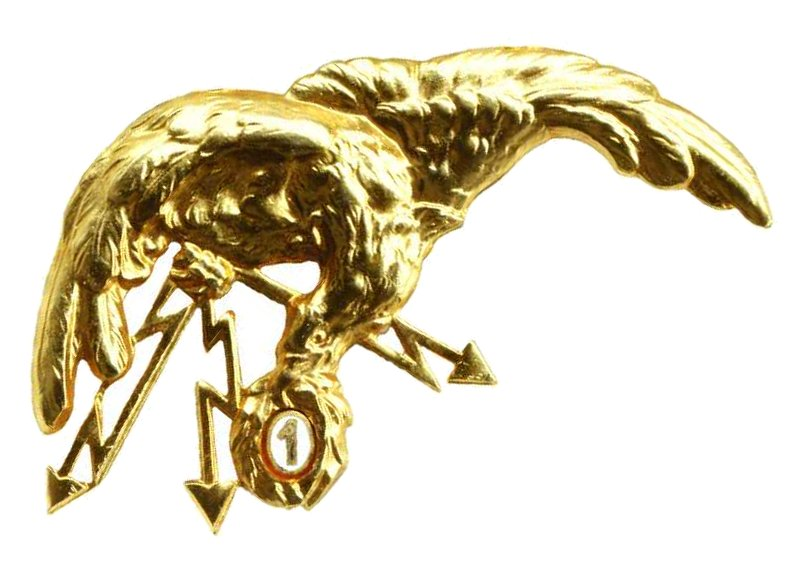
Badge	Pilot	Observer
Air Forces
	Pilot	Observer
Abbreviation	pil.	obs.

== See also ==
- Stefan Stec, creator of the Szachownica Lotnicza Polish national military aircraft insignia
- Stanisław Targosz, former commander-in-chief of the Polish Air Force
- Team Iskry
- Orlik Team
- List of aircraft of Poland, World War II
- Polish Land Forces Aircraft
- Polish Naval Aviation
- Polish Special Forces Aircraft

== Bibliography ==
- Comas, Matthieu (September 2000). "Les bombardiers polonais de Lyon-Bron" [The Polish Bombers of Lyon-Bron]. Avions: Toute l'Aéronautique et son histoire (in French) (90): 30–32. ISSN 1243-8650.
- Morgała, Andrzej (1997). Samoloty wojskowe w Polsce 1918–1924 [Military aircraft in Poland 1918–1924] (in Polish). Warsaw: Lampart. ISBN 83-86776-34-X.
- Nelcarz, Bartolomiej & Peczkowski, Robert (2001). White Eagles: The Aircraft, Men and Operations of the Polish Air Force 1918–1939. Ottringham, UK: Hikoki Publications. ISBN 1-902109-73-2.
