= Inspector of the Air Force =

Inspector of the Air Force may refer to

- Inspector of the Air Force (Germany)
- Inspector of the Air Force (Poland)
- Inspector General of the Department of the Air Force
