= PZL Rzeszów SO-3 =

SO-1/SO-3
- SO-3W engine on display at the Polish Aviation Museum
- Type: Turbojet
- National origin: Poland
- Manufacturer: WSK PZL Rzeszów
- First run: November 1968
- Major applications: PZL TS-11 Iskra
- Number built: 580

The PZL Rzeszów SO-1 and PZL Rzeszów SO-3 are Polish turbojet engines designed by the Instytut Lotnictwa (Institute of Aeronautics ) and manufactured by WSK PZL Rzeszów, to power the PZL TS-11 Iskra jet trainer. Thirty SO-1s were built, this being superseded by the improved SO-3, of which a further 580 were built. The engine has a seven-stage compressor, annular combustion chambers, and a single-stage turbine.

== Variants ==
SO-1
Original production. Overhaul life 200 hours.
SO-2
Cancelled afterburning variant of the SO-1 developed for the PZL TS-16 Grot, 14.7 kN (3,304 lbf) thrust with afterburner.
SO-3
Improved version of SO-3, intended for tropical use. Modified compressor, combustion chamber and turbine. Overhaul life 400 hours.
SO-3W22
Modified version for PZL I-22 Iryda, 10.79 kN (2,425 lbf) rating, renamed PZL-5.

== Applications ==
- PZL TS-11 Iskra
- PZL I-22 Iryda

== Specifications (SO-3) ==
Compressor intake

Data from Jane's All The World's Aircraft 1988-89.

==== General characteristics ====
- Type: Turbojet
- Length: 2,157 mm (84.7 in)
- Diameter: 707 mm (27.8 in) width, 764 mm (30.1 in) height
- Dry weight: 321 kg (708 lb)

==== Components ====
- Compressor: Seven-stage all-steel axial compressor
- Combustors: Annular with 24 combustors
- Turbine: Single-stage axial flow

==== Performance ====
- Maximum thrust: 10.8 kN (2,425 lbf) take-off, 9.8 kN (2,205 lbf) continuous
- Overall pressure ratio: 4.8:1
- Specific fuel consumption: 29.6 g/(kN⋅s) (1.04 lb/(lbf⋅h))
- Thrust-to-weight ratio: 3.4

== See also ==
Comparable engines

- Armstrong Siddeley Viper

Related lists

- List of aircraft engines
