= PZL TS-16 Grot =

TS-16 Grot

General information
- Type: Trainer / Strike fighter
- National origin: Poland
- Manufacturer: Państwowe Zakłady Lotnicze
- Designer: Tadeusz Soltyk
- Number built: 1 (TS-16RD mock-up)

The PZL TS-16 Grot (Arrowhead) was a supersonic Strike aircraft and military jet trainer designed in Poland by Tadeusz Sołtyk. It is the first jet made without any foreign support from the East, and its creation was received very coldly by both the Kremlin and by the West (since Poland was under Soviet protection at the time). The project was started in 1958, but was canceled in 1964 for political pressure by USSR, before production could start. Despite this, a mockup designated TS-16RD was built. The RD version was expected to use Soviet RD-9B engine from the MiG-19 although an indigenous powerplant called the SO-2 was also in development for the final version. The production version was to have two engines, although the TS-16RD prototype that was built had only one.

== Variants ==
TS-16A
single seat attack version, powered by 2x SO-2 engines.
TS-16B
two-seat two-engine trainer, powered by 2x SO-2 engines.
TS-16RD-A
early single-engined. single-seat prototype.
TS-16RD-B
early single-engined, two-seat prototype.

== Specifications (TS-16RD-A) ==
Data from GlobalSecurity.org : PZL TS-16 Grot

General characteristics

- Crew: 1 (TS-16RD-B 2)
- Length: 14.3 m (46 ft 11 in)
- Wingspan: 7 m (23 ft 0 in)
- Height: 4.2 m (13 ft 9 in)
- Wing area: 19.2 m^{2} (207 sq ft)
- Empty weight: 3,190 kg (7,033 lb)
- Gross weight: 4,950 kg (10,913 lb)
- Powerplant: 1 × Tumansky RD-9B afterburning turbojet, 25.48 kN (5,730 lbf) thrust dry, 32.4 kN (7,300 lbf) with afterburner

Performance

- Maximum speed: 1,210 km/h (750 mph, 650 kn) at sea level

1,460 km/h (907 mph; 788 kn) at 9,000 m (30,000 ft)

- Landing speed: 210 km/h (130 mph; 110 kn)
- Never exceed speed: 1,710 km/h (1,060 mph, 920 kn) at 5,900 m (19,400 ft)
- Range: 2,200 km (1,400 mi, 1,200 nmi)
- Service ceiling: 14,000 m (46,000 ft)
- Rate of climb: 92 m/s (18,100 ft/min) at 850 km/h (530 mph; 460 kn)

Armament
Two 23 mm cannons (one on trainer version), unguided bombs and rockets on underwing pylons.

== Similar aircraft ==
- SEPECAT Jaguar
- J-22 Orao
- Mitsubishi F-1
