= Orlik Aerobatic Team =

- Orlik Aerobatic Team emblem
- Active: 1998 - present
- Country: Poland
- Branch: Polish Air Force
- Role: Flight demonstration team

Aircraft flown
- Trainer: PZL-130 Orlik

Orlik Aerobatic Team (Zespół Akrobacyjny "ORLIK") is the aerobatic team of the Polish Air Force, formed in 1998 at the Polish Air Force Command College. Its first performance took place on April 15 1998, with its first foreign performance shortly later at the 1998 Royal International Air Tattoo at RAF Fairford. The team initially consisted of four pilots, with three formation pilots and one solo. Another solo pilot was added later on and at the end of 2000 the team increased to seven aircraft. Though it has also flown some seasons with nine aircraft, since 2011 the team flies seven aircraft.

The team receives its name from the aircraft it flies, the PZL-130 Orlik.

== See also ==
- Scorpion aerobatic team
- Team Iskry
