= PZL-130 Orlik =

Trainer aircraft

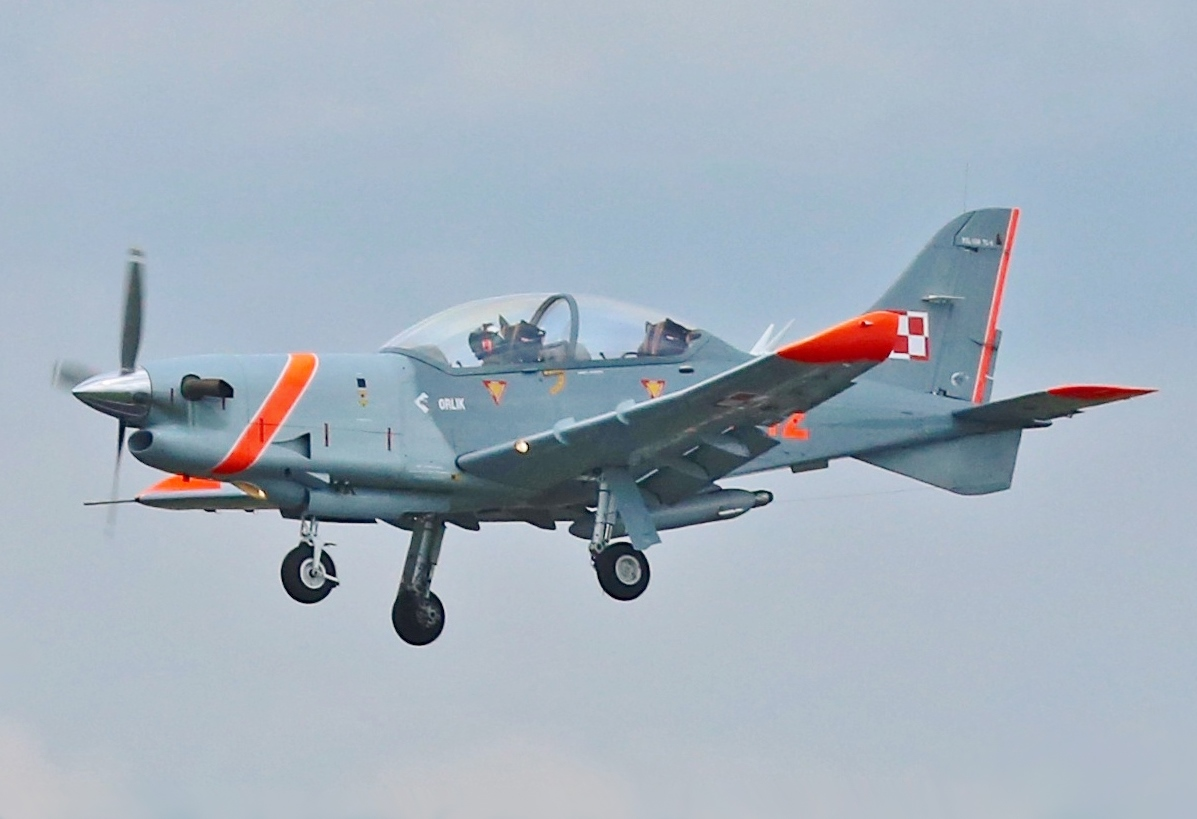
- A PZL-130 of Orlik Aerobatic Team over Royal International Air Tattoo 2014

General information
- Type: Trainer
- National origin: Poland
- Manufacturer: Airbus Poland SA
- Primary user: Polish Air Force
- Number built: 50 + 9 prototypes

History
- Introduction date: 1994
- First flight: 24 October 1984

The PZL 130 Orlik (English: Eaglet) is a Polish turboprop, single engine, two seat trainer aircraft.

== Development and design ==
The Orlik was designed by PZL Warszawa-Okecie as a trainer for the Polish Air Force, intended as a replacement for its PZL-110 Kolibers. It was also designed to meet the US FAR 23 standard. The project was under the supervision of Andrzej Frydrychewicz, head engineer of PZL Warszawa-Okecie. It was fitted with a low-aspect ratio wing to better simulate the handling characteristics of jet fighters. The aircraft was designed to be powered by a Soviet-designed and built Vedeneyev M14Pm radial engine with the intention of replacing it by a modified Polish built Ivchenko AI-14 engine in production aircraft. The first prototype Orlik flew on 12 October 1984, with a second prototype following in December and a third in January 1985.

While the Polish Air Force planned to power its Orliks with locally produced radial engines, PZL planned a turboprop powered version, the PZL-130T Turbo Orlik for export purposes. The third prototype was therefore re-fitted with a 410 kW (550 shp) Pratt & Whitney PT6A-25P turboprop, flying in this form on 13 July 1986, but was destroyed in a crash in January 1987 while being demonstrated to a representative of the Colombian Air Force. Two further turboprop prototypes followed in 1989 and 1990, powered by a Czech-built 560 kW (750 shp) Walter M-601E and a PT6A-25 as the PZL-130TB and PZL-130TP respectively.

In 1990, development of the piston-engined Orlik was abandoned, as the Polish built radial engines gave insufficient power, with Polish interest switching to the M-601 powered PZL-130TB.

== Operational history ==
Deliveries of PZL-130TBs to Poland started in 1994, with the aircraft equipping the Military Pilot Academy at Dęblin and the 60th Training Air Regiment at Radom. All Polish PZL-130TBs were upgraded to the TC-1 standard type, with better ejection seats and avionics.

== Variants ==
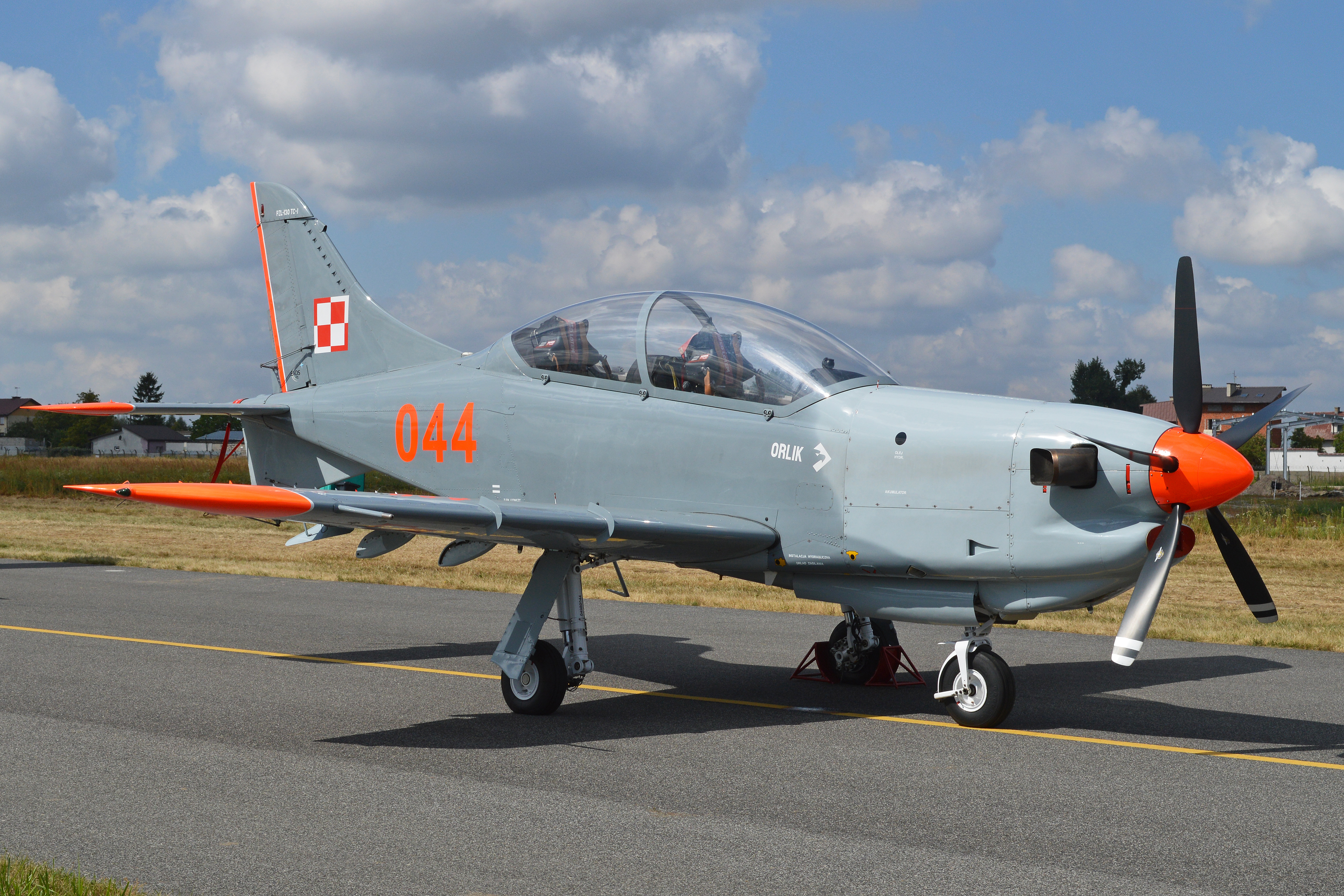
PZL 130 TC-1

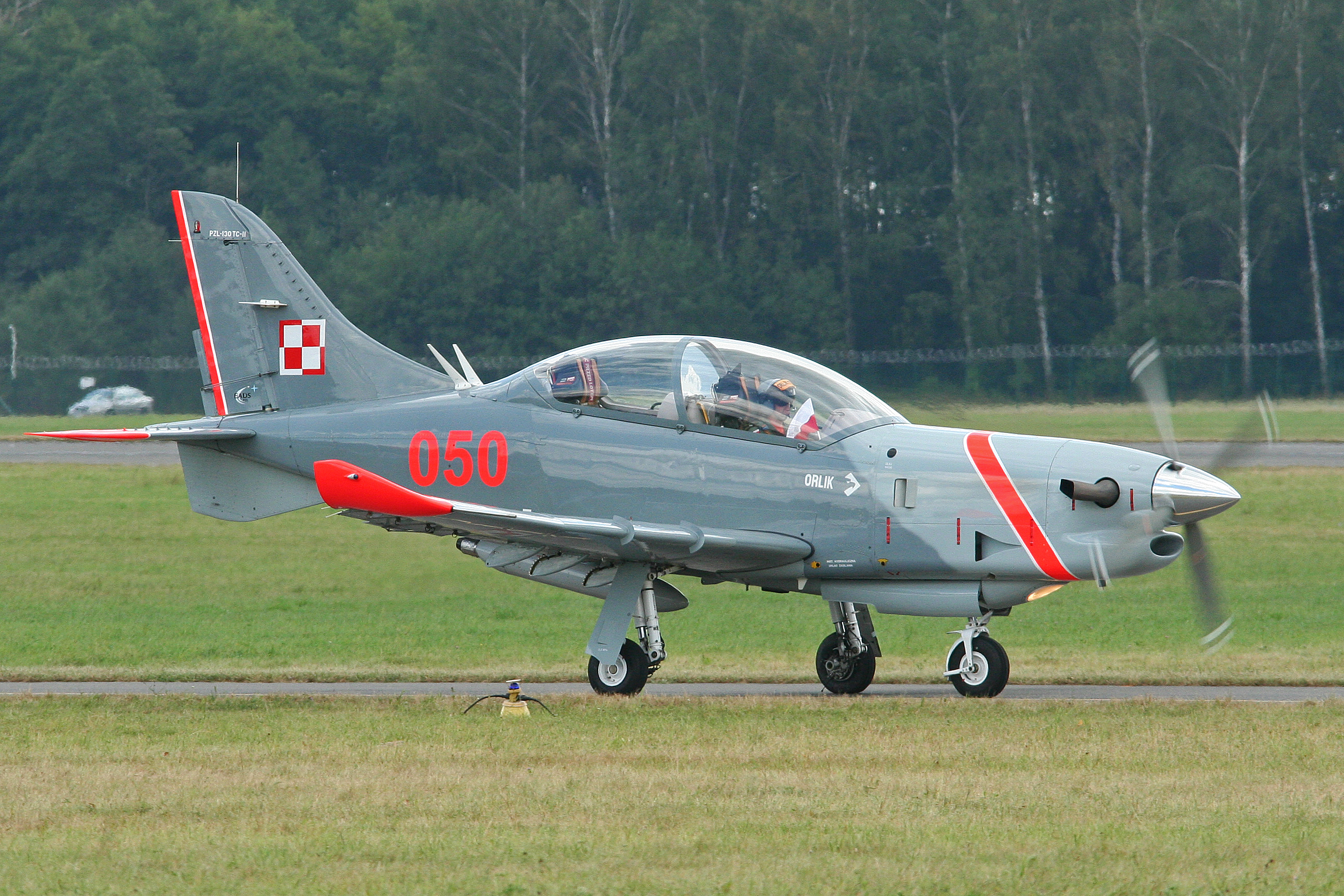
PZL-130 TC-2

PZL-130 Orlik
The original aircraft with one Vedeneyev M14Pm piston engine
PZL-130T Turbo Orlik
Variant with a Pratt & Whitney Canada PT6A-25P turboprop engine
PZL-130TM Orlik
Variant with a Walter M601E turboprop engine
PZL-130TB Orlik
Variant with a Walter M601T turboprop engine
PZL-130TC I Orlik
Variant with added Martin-Baker Mk.11, zero-zero class ejection seats and modernized avionics
PZL-130TC II Orlik (Garmin)
Variant with Pratt & Whitney Canada PT6A-25C turboprop, added winglets, modernized Garmin avionics and changed flight tutor's seat position
PZL-130TC II Orlik (GC)
Variant with glass cockpit and Head-Up Display, company name is Orlik MPT (Multi Purpose Trainer).

== Operators ==
Poland

- Polish Air Force
- Polish Navy – Former operator.

== Specifications (PZL-130TC II Orlik) ==

General characteristics

- Crew: 2
- Length: 9.3 m (30 ft 6 in)
- Wingspan: 10 m (32 ft 10 in)
- Height: 3.53 m (11 ft 7 in)
- Wing area: 14.56 m^{2} (156.7 sq ft)
- Empty weight: 1,825 kg (4,023 lb)
- Gross weight: 2,400 kg (5,291 lb)
- Max takeoff weight: 2,950 kg (6,504 lb)
- Powerplant: 1 × Pratt & Whitney Canada PT6A-25C turboprop, 560 kW (750 shp)

Performance

- Maximum speed: 550 km/h (340 mph, 300 kn)
- Cruise speed: 490 km/h (300 mph, 260 kn)
- Range: 2,200 km (1,400 mi, 1,200 nmi)
- Service ceiling: 10,000 m (33,000 ft)
- Rate of climb: 14.4 m/s (2,830 ft/min)

Armament

- Hardpoints: 6 with a capacity of 700 kg (1,500 lb)

== See also ==
- Orlik Aerobatic Team

Aircraft of comparable role, configuration, and era

- Atlas ACE
- Beechcraft T-6 Texan II
- Beechcraft T-34 Mentor
- Embraer EMB 312 Tucano
- Fuji T-7
- KAI KT-1
- Pilatus PC-7
- Pilatus PC-9
- Short Tucano
- Socata TB-31 Omega
- TAI Hürkuş
- Kobac
- HAL HTT-40
