= White-and-Red Sparks =

Team Iskry
- Team Iskry patch
- Active: 1969 - 2022
- Country: Poland
- Branch: Polish Air Force
- Role: Aerobatic flight demonstration team

Aircraft flown
- Trainer: 7x PZL TS-11 Iskra

Bialo-Czerwone Iskry ("White-and-Red Sparks") was an aerobatic demonstration team of the Polish Air Forces. It was originally formed in 1969 at the 60 Training Wing in Radom under the name Rombik. The team flew four TS-11 Iskras. The team grew to nine pilots between 1993 and 1998 and was rebased to the 1 Air Training Centre in Dęblin. The team was the last user of the TS-11 Iskra, and flew their final display in August 2021 before disbanding.

== See also ==
- Orlik Aerobatic Team
- Scorpion aerobatic team
