= PZL TS-11 Iskra =

Trainer aircraft in Poland

TS-11 Iskra
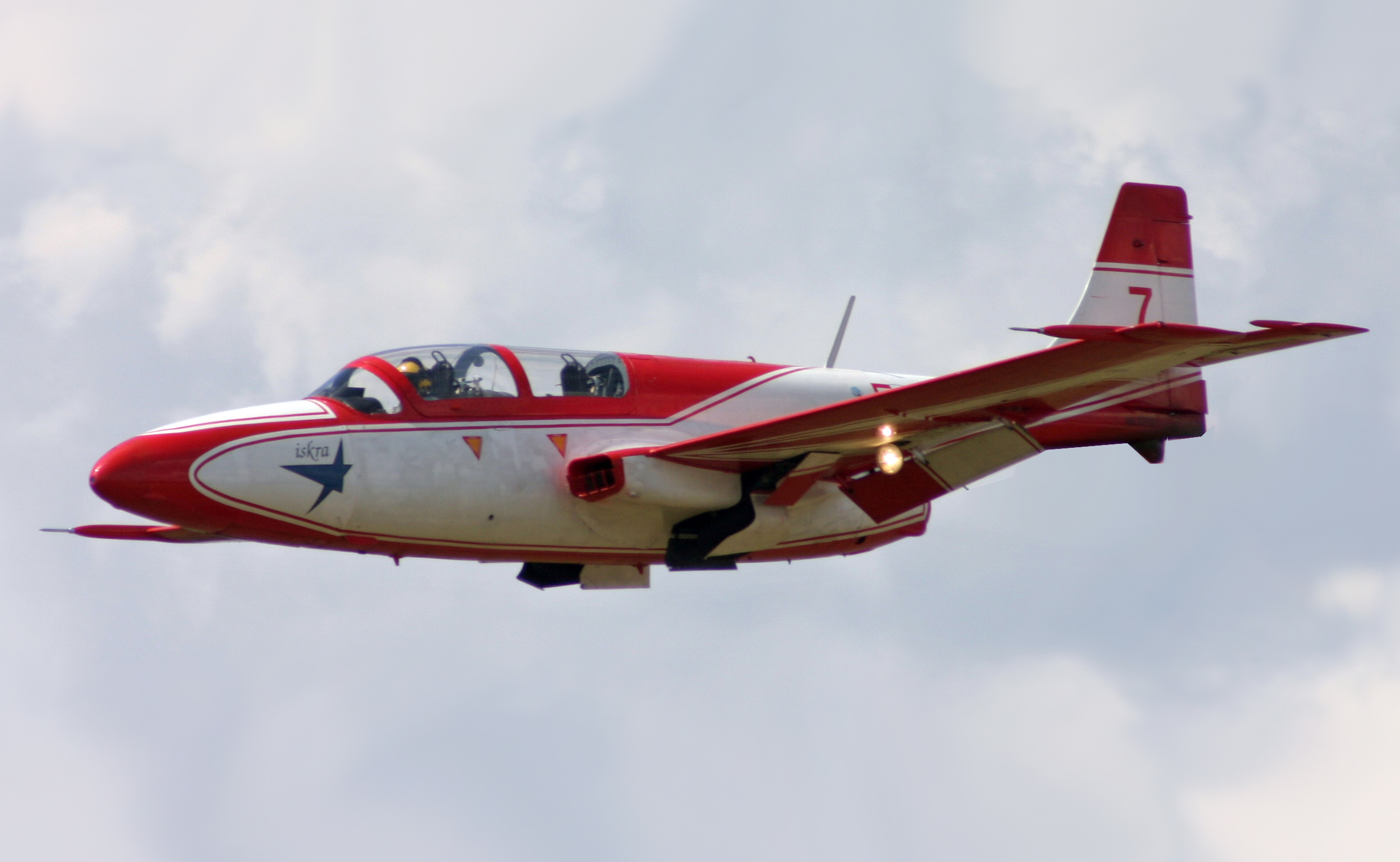
- TS-11 Iskra of Team Iskry over an Air show in Góraszka

General information
- Type: Trainer aircraft
- Manufacturer: PZL-Mielec
- Status: Retired
- Primary users: Polish Air Force Polish Navy; Indian Air Force
- Number built: 424

History
- Manufactured: 1963–1987
- Introduction date: 1964
- First flight: 5 February 1960
- Retired: 2021

The PZL TS-11 Iskra (English: Spark) is a Polish jet trainer, developed and manufactured by aircraft company PZL-Mielec. It was used by the air forces of Poland and India. It is notable as being the first domestically developed jet aircraft to be produced by Poland, and its service for over 50 years as the principal training aircraft of the Polish Air Force. At the time of its retirement in 2021, it was the oldest jet-propelled aircraft still in service in Poland.

As a part of efforts to preserve Poland's ability to independently develop aircraft in an era of political and economic subservience to the neighbouring Soviet Union, during the 1950s, Polish engineers at the Poland's Aviation Institute (IL) commenced early work upon the design of what would become the first jet aircraft to be developed in Poland. Following the death of Joseph Stalin, work on the initiative could be performed more openly and government officials became supportive of such a venture. The fledgling design was heavily influenced by the requirements specified by the Polish Air Force, who had formalised a requirement for a jet-propelled aircraft for training purposes. On 5 February 1960, the first prototype conducted its maiden flight, powered by an imported British Armstrong Siddeley Viper turbojet engine.

During 1963, deliveries of the first production model of the type, designated as the TS-11 Iskra bis A, commenced to the Polish Air Force. During the 1960s, the Iskra competed to be selected as the standard jet trainer throughout the Warsaw Pact. However, it was not selected to fulfil this significant role, the rival Czechoslovak Aero L-29 Delfín having been chosen instead, which went on to be built in greater numbers for a wide number of export customers. Production of the TS-11 came to an end during 1987, however the type remained in service with the Polish Air Force and the Indian Air Force into the 21st century. From 1969 onwards, a handful of TS-11s have been used by the Polish Air Force's Biało-Czerwone Iskry aerobatics display team, who performed their last display on 22 August 2021. It has also been used for aerial reconnaissance purposes. During the aircraft's later years of service, several examples have been sold onto private owners.

== Development ==
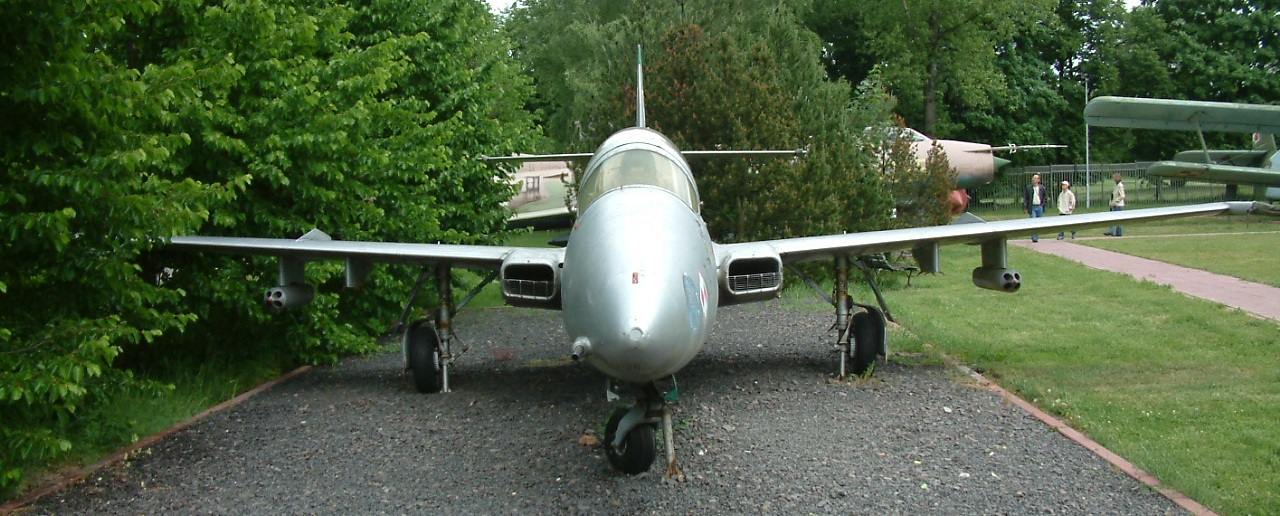
TS-11 Iskra bis B – front view

Following the end of World War II, Poland was politically dominated by the neighbouring Soviet Union; as a consequence, the Polish aviation industry underwent vast changes at the behest of the Soviets. According to aviation author Jerzy K. Cynk, the immediate post-war decade was a period of frustrated efforts and disappointments, by early 1951, all of the nation's design offices had been dissolved and the entirety of indigenous projects were terminated. Instead, Poland's aircraft factories were assigned to produce mainly Russian-sourced military-orientated equipment to meet the requirements of the Soviet war machine, such as the Mikoyan-Gurevich MiG-17 fighter aircraft. Shortly following the death of Soviet leader Joseph Stalin, military orders were drastically cut, leading to Polish aircraft plants falling idle and some being permanently closed down.

While the nation's design offices had been liquidated, some former members had joined Poland's Aviation Institute (Instytut Lotnictwa - IL) and performed some limited work on various original projects, even though such efforts were initially officially discouraged. As such, it was at IL that the effort to design would become the first jet aircraft to be developed in Poland originated; however, during the late 1950s, responsibility for the design work on the program was transferred to aircraft manufacturer PZL-Mielec at an early stage in order that IL could resume its primary mission of scientific and technological research. Much of the design work on the program was produced in response to the specified needs of a requirement issued by the Polish Air Force for a capable jet-propelled trainer aircraft, which was seeking a replacement for the piston-engined PZL TS-8 Bies at the time.

Polish government officials came to openly regard the project as being of considerable importance to the nation's aviation industry, thus vigorous efforts were made to support the development of the TS-11. The main designer was Polish aeronautical engineer Tadeusz Sołtyk; his initials was the source for part of the type's official designation TS-11. Early on, it was decided to adopt a foreign-sourced turbojet engine to power the aircraft. Quickly, the British Armstrong Siddeley Viper had emerged as the company's favoured option; however, reportedly, negotiations for its acquisition eventually broke down; accordingly, work on the project was delayed until a suitable domestically built powerplant had reached an advanced stage of development.

On 5 February 1960, the first prototype conducted its maiden flight, powered by an imported Viper 8 engine, capable of producing up to 7.80 kN (1,750 lb_{f}) of thrust. On 11 September 1960, the aircraft's existence was publicly revealed during an aerial display held over Łódź. The next pair of prototypes, which performed their first flights during March and July 1961 respectively, were instead powered by a Polish copy of the Viper engine, designated as the WSK HO-10. The flight test program that the three prototypes were subjected to had both demonstrated the capabilities of the new aircraft and its suitability for satisfying the Polish Air Force's stated requirements for a trainer jet; as such, it was soon accepted by the Polish Air Force.

During 1963, the first production model of the type, designated as the TS-11 Iskra bis A, commenced delivery to the service. From about 1966, new-build aircraft were furnished with a newer Polish-designed turbojet engine, designated as the WSK SO-1, which was capable of producing up to 9.80 kN (2,200 lb_{f}) of thrust and reportedly gave the TS-11 a top speed of 497 mph. From 1969 onwards, the improved WSK SO-3 engine became available, offering considerably longer times between overhauls; this engine was later improved into the WSK SO-3W, which was able to generate 10.80 kN (2,425 lb_{f}) of thrust.

== Design ==
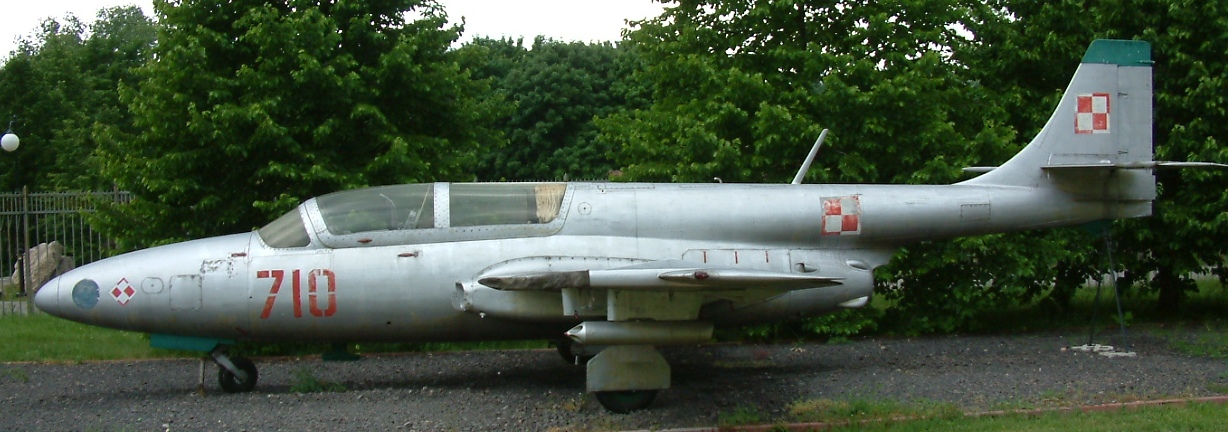
TS-11 Iskra bis B

The PZL TS-11 Iskra is an all-metal jet-propelled trainer aircraft. It is relatively conventional in layout, featuring a trapezoid-shaped mid-wing arrangement. These wings, which only had a gentle angle of sweep along the leading edge, feature air intakes embedded into the wing root. The TS-11's single turbojet engine is accommodated within the main fuselage, its exhaust is located beneath the boom-mounted tail fin, which provides the aircraft with a fairly unusual silhouette. Both of the crew, typically being the student in the front and instructor in the back, are provided with ejector seats for emergency egress.

Fixed armament of this airplane consist of a single nose-mounted Nudelman-Rikhter NR-23 cannon with 80 rounds, along with a total of four underwing hardpoints that were compatible with a variety of different weapons, including bombs and Mars rocket pods loaded with up to 8 S-5 FFARs each. Most models of the aircraft lack a radar set; however, the specialised TS-11R reconnaissance variant has been provided with such equipment in a form Bendix RDR radar set with limited air to ground capability. The TS-11 can also be outfitted with AFA-39 cameras for the purpose of performing aerial photography missions.

== Operational history ==
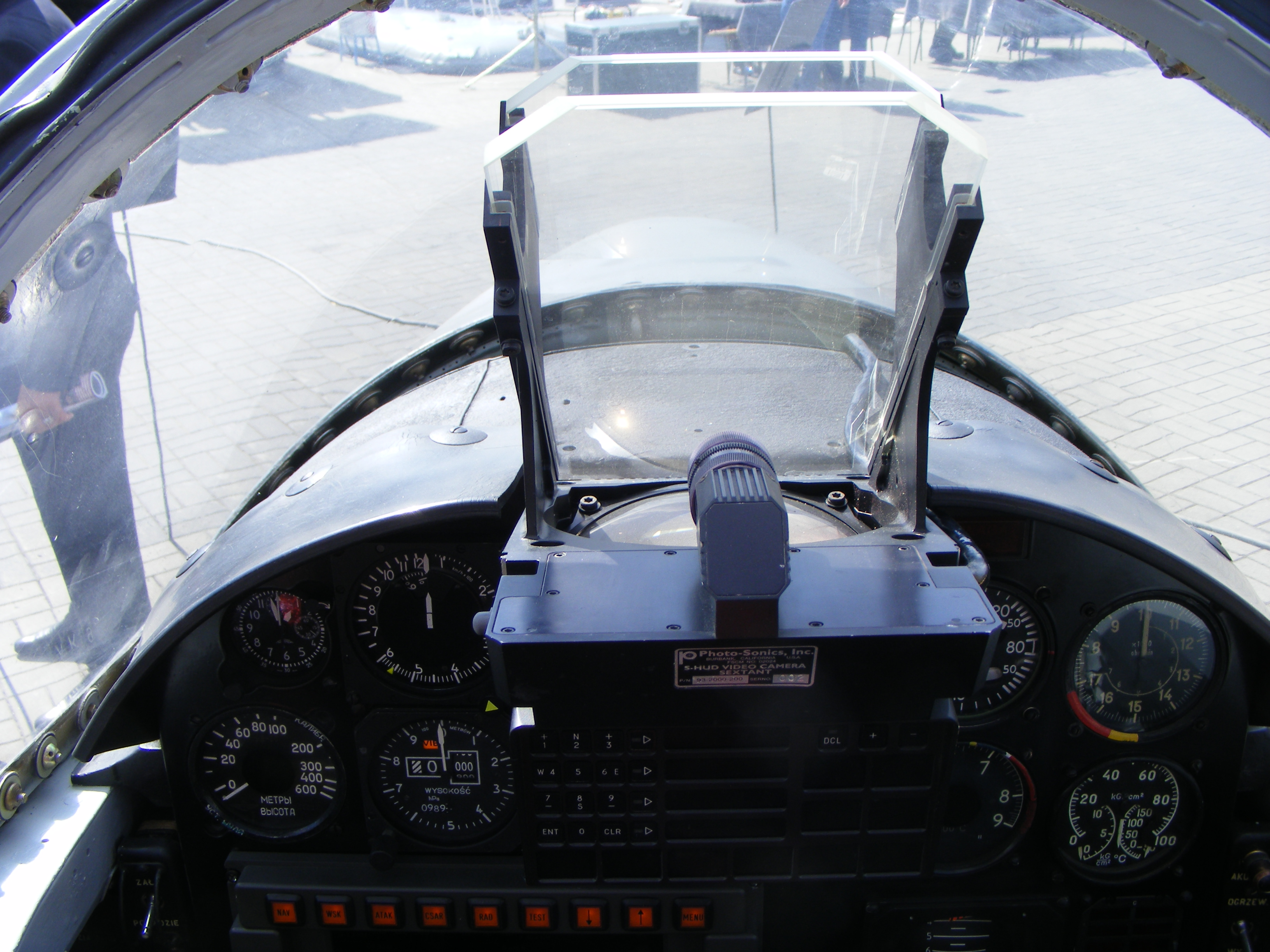
HUD mounted in PZL TS-11F Iskra (MSPO 2008).

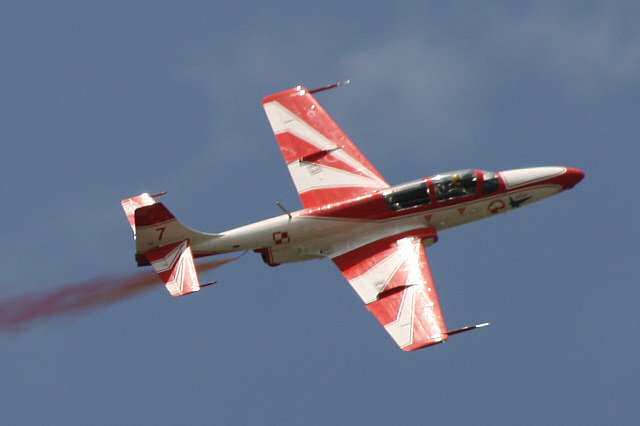
TS-11 Iskra MR of Biało-Czerwone Iskry aerobatic team

During 1964, the TS-11 prototype broke four separate world records in its class, including a speed record, having been recorded as having attained a top speed of 839 km/h (524 mph) during one flight. From 1969 onwards, various TS-11s have been used by the Polish Air Force's aerobatics display team, which was initially called Rombik and is currently named Biało-Czerwone Iskry (Translates to English as White-and-Red Sparks). Unusually for an Eastern European aircraft of the era, the TS-11 never received a NATO reporting name (for jet trainers, a two-syllable word starting with letter M) for the type.

During the 1960s, the Iskra competed to be selected as the standard jet trainer for the Warsaw Pact, the Soviet Union had given Poland a promise to support its aviation industry and to favour the procurement of suitable aircraft for this purpose from Polish manufacturers. However, the Iskra was not selected for this role, it had lost out to the Czechoslovak Aero L-29 Delfín, another newly designed jet-propelled trainer aircraft; according to aviation author John C. Fredrikson, this outcome had been highly unexpected and surprising to several observers. Largely as a result of this decision, Poland became the only Warsaw Pact member to adopt the Iskra while most others adopting the rival Delfin instead.

During 1975, an initial batch of 50 Iskra bis D trainer aircraft were exported to India, the type's sole export customer; during the 1990s, a further 26 aircraft were delivered to the Indian Air Force.They were to perform advanced weaponry training alongwith the HAL HJT-16 Kiran. Some units were deployed during the Kargil war at Srinagar to shoot down UAV's flying over Jammu. During its Indian service, a total of seven aircraft were reportedly lost, killing four crew. During December 2004, the Indian Air Force officially withdrew the last of its Iskra trainers.All IAF Iskras were based at Hakimpet and was nicknamed "lady", in IAF service.

By 1987, a total of 424 aircraft had reportedly been constructed, after which point production of the type was terminated due to a lack of demand.

During 2002, the Polish Air Force reportedly still operated a fleet of 110 TS-11s, including 5 TS-11R reconnaissance aircraft. The Iskra became the first and so far the only Polish jet trainer to reach serial production – the programme intended to produce a successor, the PZL I-22 Iryda (later designated as the M-93 Iryda), failed for several reasons and only a few were completed during the 1990s before the program was aborted. In its place, the TS-11 has been considered for upgrades to better enable its continued service; however, during 2010, the Polish Air Force issued a tender for a new advanced jet pilot training system to eventually replace the TS-11.

By 2013, Poland was stated to have a total of 30 (total number of school aircraft: TS-11, PZL-130) operational Iskras still in service. During 2016, Poland took delivery of its first few Alenia Aermacchi M-346 Masters, a modern trainer aircraft which, in conjunction with ground-based training equipment such as flight simulators, shall progressively take on the Polish Air Force's training needs. On the 9 December 2020 the last Polish Air Force training sortie of the TS-11 Iskra serial number 2001 took place after which the jet training of the Polish Air Force passed to the Alenia Aermacchi M-346 Master of which Poland has 12 in service as of December 2020. The only Polish Air Force TS-11 left flying in Poland after 9 December 2020 were the display team TS-11 from Team Iskry, who performed their final display on 22 August 2021.

== Variants ==
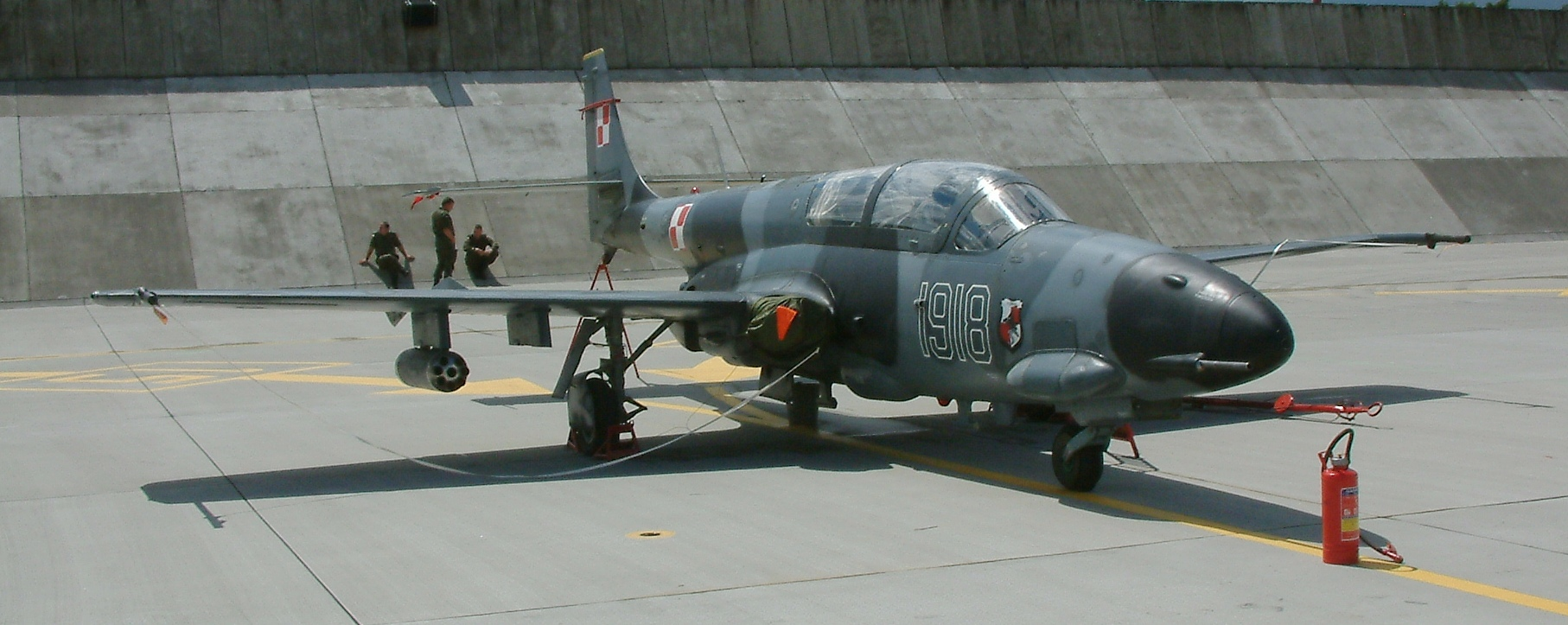
Polish TS-11 Iskra R

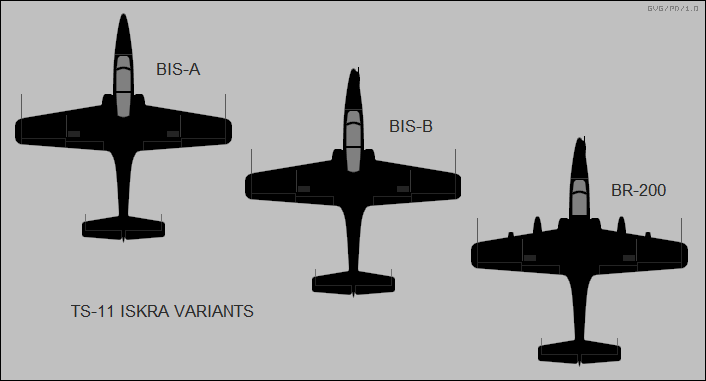
Variants of the TS-11

Prototype.
Two of the aircraft were built, making their maiden flights in March and July 1961, respectively. It can be seen that it is not equipped with anything that looks like weapons.
TS-11 Iskra bis-A
An early production two-seat training aircraft of which 100 were produced and deployed. The other six aircraft built and deployed were converted to the TS-11 Iskra-R.
TS-11 Iskra bis-B
It is the second mass-produced model with 117 deployed, and is equipped with four pylons on the underside of the main wing, allowing it to be used for combat training. Another name is "TS-11 Iskra 100".
TS-11 Iskra bis-C
A single-seat reconnaissance aircraft type with five aircraft deployed, developed in 1971 and manufactured in 1972. A reconnaissance camera is installed on the underside of the fuselage, and the fuel tank has been strengthened to increase capacity. Another name is "TS-11 Iskra 200 Art".It was later converted back into a two-seat trainer in 1983.
TS-11 Iskra bis-D
This is the third mass-produced version with 24 deployed, and the payload has increased. Another 76 aircraft were built and were exported to the Indian Air Force. Another name is "TS-11 Iskra 200SB".
TS-11 Iskra bis-DF
Tactical reconnaissance aircraft type with 100 units deployed. It was mainly used for reconnaissance training. In addition to three cameras, it is possible to mount weapons on the aircraft.
TS-11 Iskra-R
An offshore reconnaissance aircraft type deployed by modifying six TS-11s. Equipped with radar for surveillance. Upgrade were carried out in 1991.
TS-11 Iskra-MR
TS-11 with modernized avionics according to ICAO standards and operated in the Biało-Czerwone Iskry aerobatics team since 1998.
TS-11 Iskra-Jet / TS-11 Spark
After being withdrawn from service, it was disarmed and sold to private users in the United States, Australia and others countries as a warbird valued for its double seats and easy handling.
TS-11 Iskra-BR200
Single-seat attack and reconnaissance aircraft prototype from 1972, did not enter production.
TS-11F Iskra
Proposition of modernisation of TS-11 made by Instytut Techniczny Wojsk Lotniczych, as training jet preparing pilots to operate on F-16 C/D Block 52+

== Former operators ==
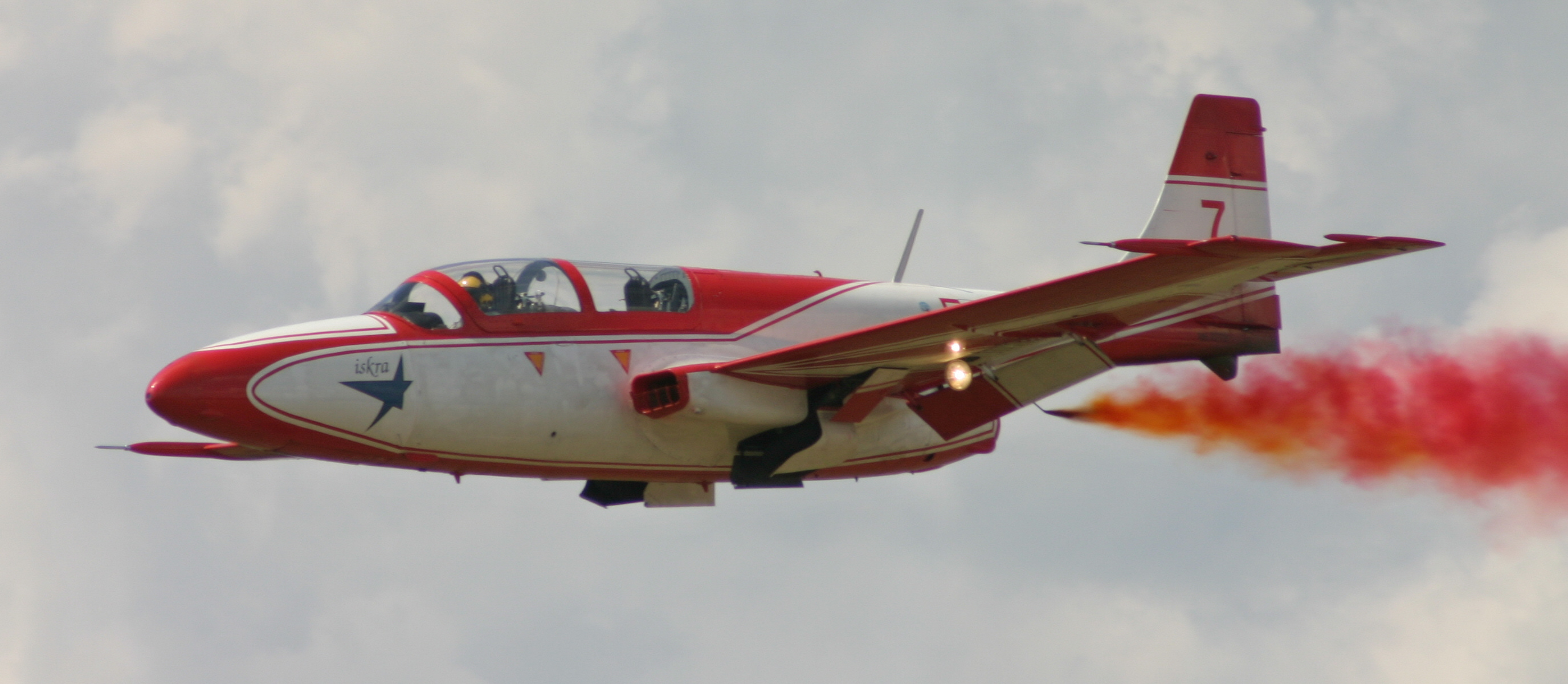
TS-11 Iskra MR of Biało-Czerwone Iskry team

Poland

- Polish Air Force

- Polish Navy

India

- Indian Air Force received 76 aircraft. All were withdrawn in December 2004.

== Specifications (Iskra bis D) ==
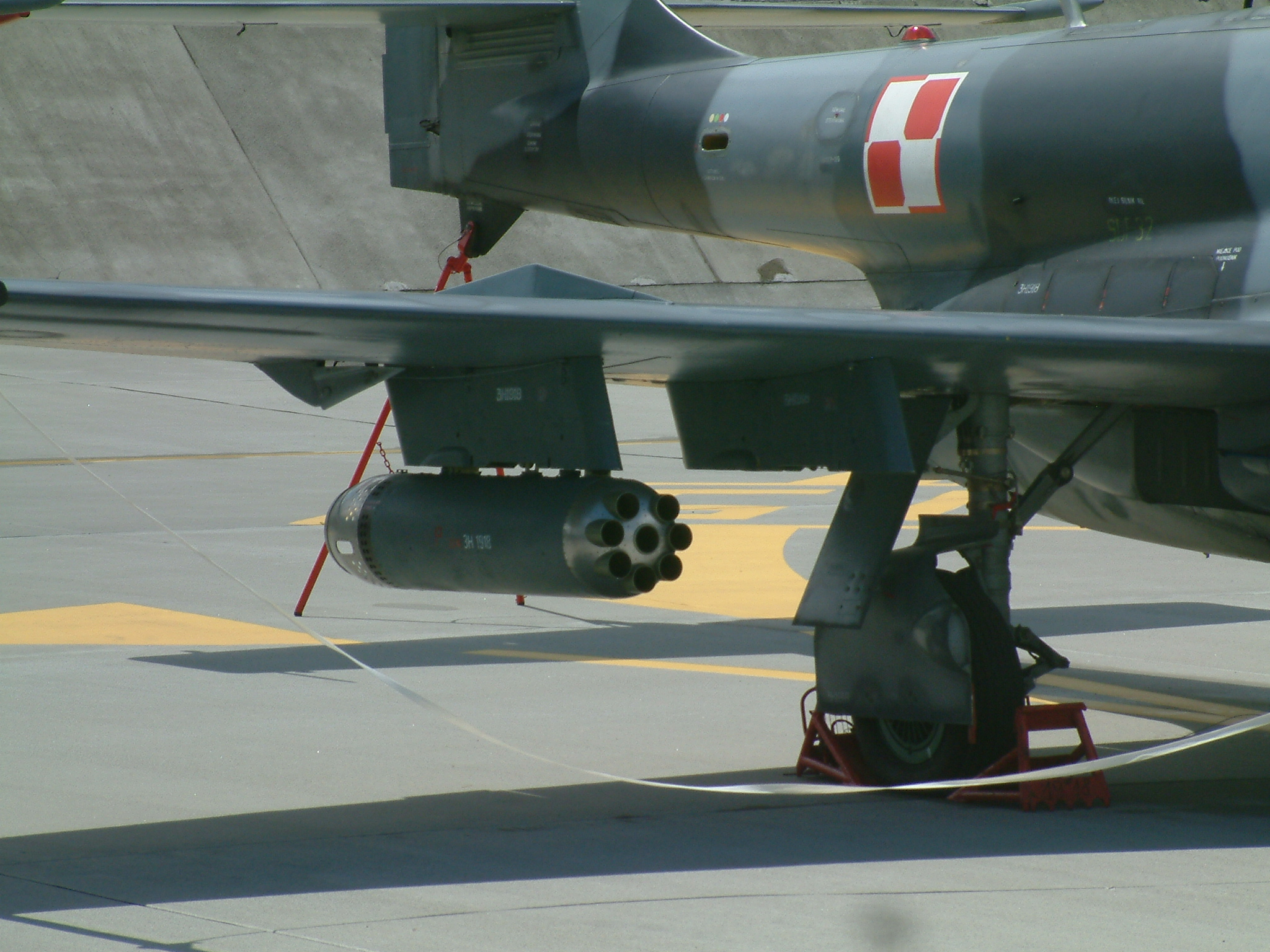
Unguided rocket pod on external pylon of TS-11 Iskra R

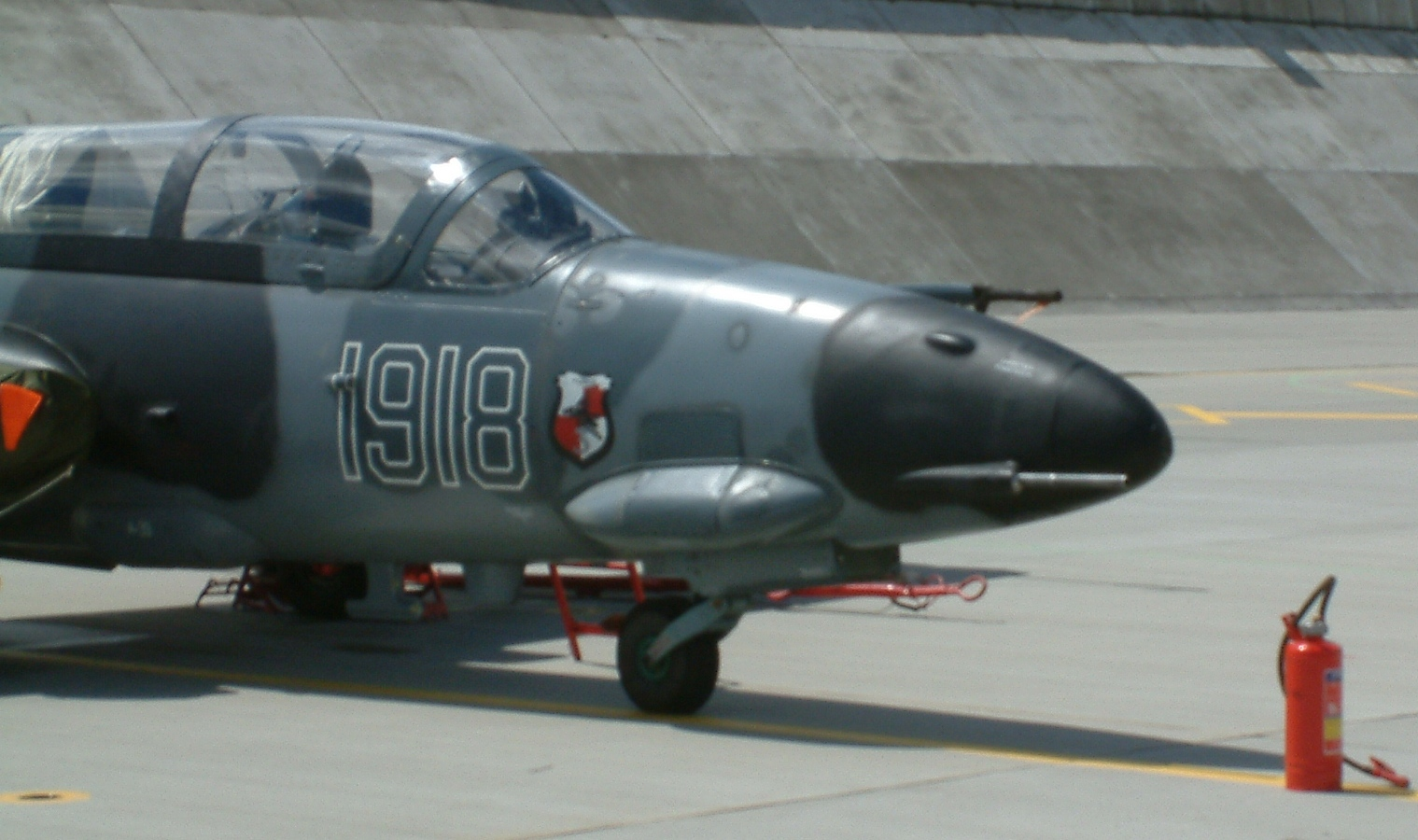
Nose of TS-11 Iskra R, barrel of 23mm cannon is visible

Data from Jane's All The World's Aircraft 1976-77

General characteristics

- Crew: 2
- Length: 11.15 m (36 ft 7 in)
- Wingspan: 10.06 m (33 ft 0 in)
- Height: 3.5 m (11 ft 6 in)
- Wing area: 17.5 m^{2} (188 sq ft)
- Airfoil: root: NACA 64-209; tip: NACA 64-009
- Empty weight: 2,560 kg (5,644 lb)
- Gross weight: 3,734 kg (8,232 lb)
- Max takeoff weight: 3,840 kg (8,466 lb)
- Powerplant: 1 × WSK SO-3 turbojet engine, 9.81 kN (2,210 lbf) thrust

Performance

- Maximum speed: 720 km/h (450 mph, 390 kn) at 5,000 m (16,000 ft)
- Cruise speed: 600 km/h (370 mph, 320 kn)
- Stall speed: 140 km/h (87 mph, 76 kn)
- Never exceed speed: 750 km/h (470 mph, 400 kn)
- Range: 1,250 km (780 mi, 670 nmi)
- Service ceiling: 11,000 m (36,000 ft)
- Rate of climb: 14.8 m/s (2,910 ft/min)
- Wing loading: 213 kg/m^{2} (44 lb/sq ft)
- Thrust/weight: 0.30

Armament

- 1x 23 mm NS-23 or NR-23 cannon in the nose
- 4 underwing pylons, up to 400 kg (880 lb) of bombs or unguided S-5 rocket pods Mars-4 (8 rockets) or Zeus-1 (12,7mm) gun packs.

== See also ==
Aircraft of comparable role, configuration, and era

- Aermacchi MB-326
- Aero L-29 Delfín
- BAC Jet Provost
- CASA C-101
- Fouga CM.170 Magister
- Soko G-2 Galeb
- Temco TT Pinto
- Yakovlev Yak-30 (1960)
