= Scorpion aerobatic team =

Grupa Akrobacyjna Skorpion
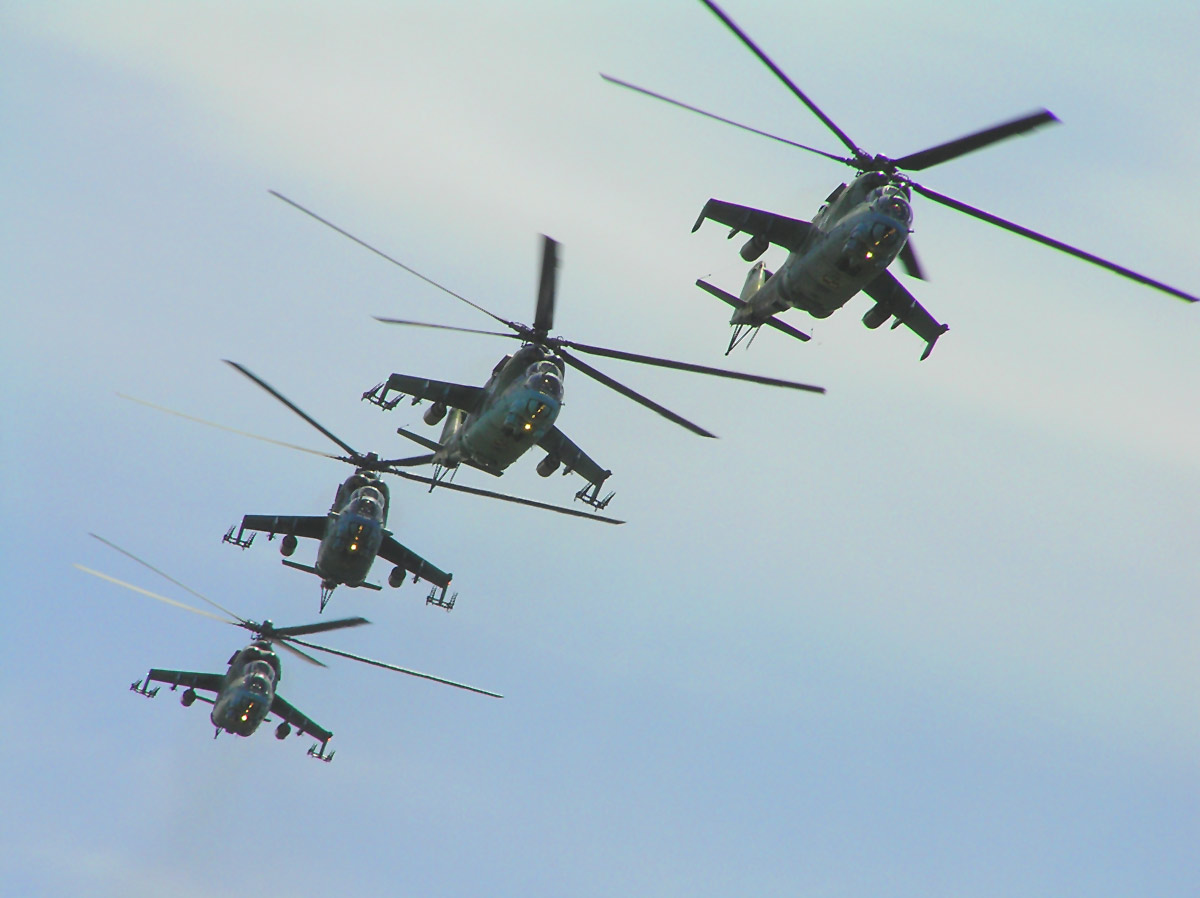
- Skorpion Team during demo flight
- Active: 1999 – present
- Country: Poland
- Branch: Polish Land Forces
- Role: Aerobatic flight demonstration team

Aircraft flown
- Attack helicopter: 4x Mi-24

Grupa Akrobacyjna Skorpion ("Scorpion" Aerobatic team) is an aerobatic demonstration team of the aviation arm of the Polish Land Forces, flying 4 Mil Mi-24 Helicopters. It is one of the few helicopter aerobatic teams in the world and one of only 2 flying the Mi-24. Originally formed in 1999 at the 49th combat helicopters regiment in Pruszcz Gdański, the team made its début in 1999 at an air picnic in Pruszcz Gdański, and later performed at the 1999 Radom Air Show.

In 2011 the team was reported to have suspended flights due to operational commitments in 2010, as some of its pilots are on duty in Afghanistan.

== See also ==
- Orlik Aerobatic Team
- Team Iskry
