= PZL I-22 Iryda =

Polish jet trainer aircraft

PZL I-22
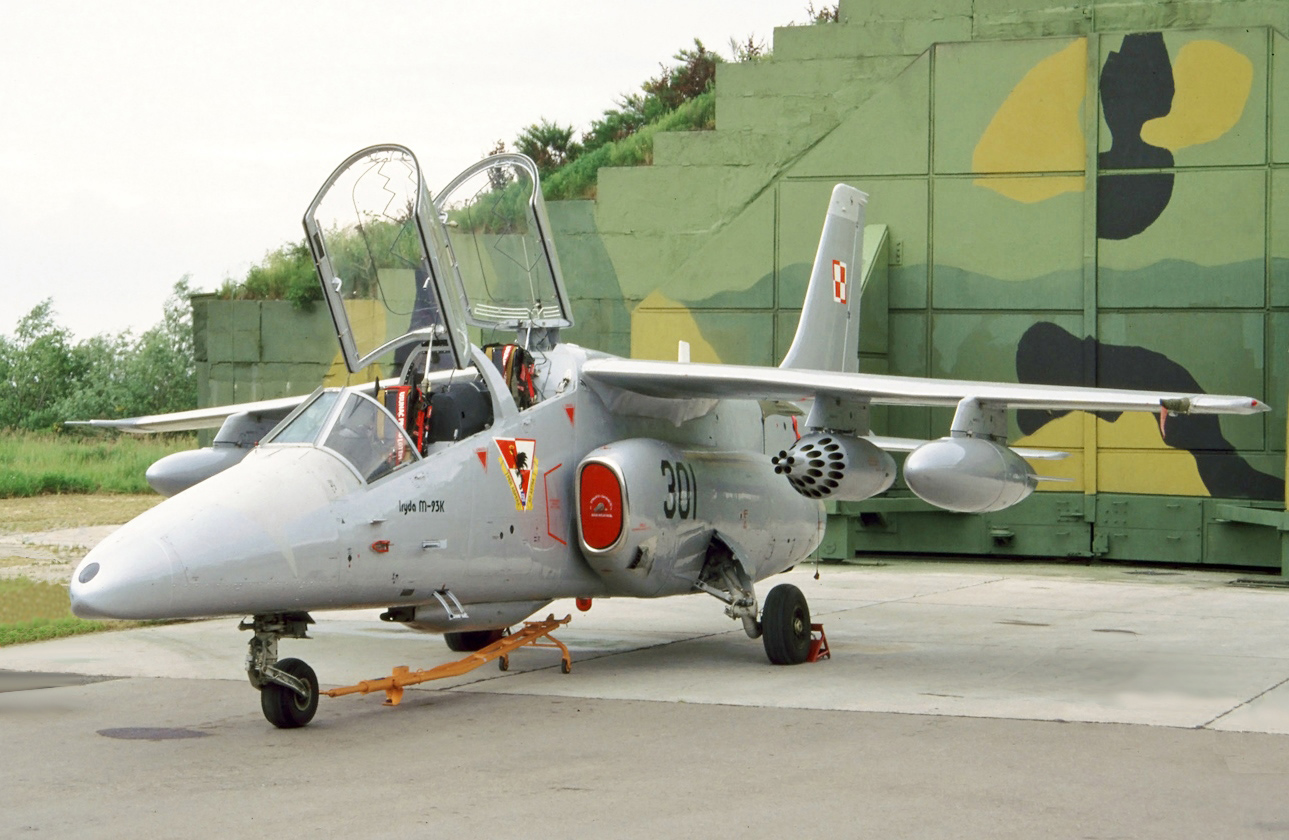
- PZL I-22 M93K

General information
- Type: Jet trainer
- Manufacturer: PZL Mielec
- Status: Retired
- Primary user: Polish Air Force
- Number built: 17 including prototypes

History
- Introduction date: 22 December 1992
- First flight: 3 March 1985
- Retired: 1996

The PZL I-22 Iryda, otherwise known as the PZL M93 Iryda and PZL M96 Iryda, was a twin-engine, two-seat military jet trainer aircraft developed and produced by Polish aviation company PZL Mielec.

Work started on what would become the Iryda in 1976 as a successor to the indigenously-developed TS-11 Iskra jet trainer. First flying on 3 March 1985, the type would have a protracted development, partly due to the initial unavailability of its PZL K-15 turbojet engines. The Polish Air Force received the first K-15-powered Irydas in May 1995. However, aircraft deliveries were complicated by disputes over cost and performance, leading to multiple announcements, policy reversals, and groundings of the type. A fatal accident involving the type on 24 January 1996 fuelled criticism and undermined support for the programme.

In 1996, an agreement was struck to upgrade the existing aircraft to a new standard, flight testing of which commenced the following year. However, relations between PZL Mielec and the Polish Defense Ministry became so poor over the programme that legal action was initiated while the Iryda itself languished. In the late 1990s Polish Government support for the programme was withdrawn, and the handful of delivered aircraft were stored. Despite attempts to revive the programme by PZL Mielec, no orders have been forthcoming.

== Development ==
=== Early work ===
In 1976, the Warsaw Institute of Aeronautics (Polish: Instytut Lotnictwa) initiated work on a program to develop a new jet-powered trainer aircraft; this was primarily envisioned to replace the Polish Air Force's existing TS-11 Iskra fleet, an indigenously-developed first generation jet trainer aircraft. A key feature of the new type would be its PZL K-15 turbojet engines, which were also locally designed by the Warsaw Institute of Aeronautics. Subsequently dubbed Iryda, the aircraft was designed by PZL Mielec (then WSK-Mielec).

On 3 March 1985, the first prototype conducted the type's maiden flight. Early examples of the type were powered by a pair of PZL-5s, an older generation turbojet engine; these were considered to be underpowered and were only intended as a temporary measure while issues with the newer K-15 were being resolved. Following the Revolutions of 1989, Poland soon gained greater accessibility to international markets; this had an impact upon the fledgling Iryda. It was chosen to adopt a British-developed Martin-Baker Mk.10 ejection seat; consideration was reportedly given to the incorporation of foreign-sourced avionics from French aeronautics company SAGEM.

During May 1995, the first pair of M-93K Irydas were delivered to the Polish Air Force; these were intended to be the production-standard version of the type. Unlike the five preceding units of the type that had been previously handed over, the M-93K model was powered by the PZL K-15 engines instead of the older PZL-5 units which had been adopted as an interim powerplant. Amongst other benefits, the more powerful K-15 engines almost doubled the Iryda's payload capacity. The K-15 engine was not considered to be a likely candidate for export sales of the Iryda; British engine manufacturer Rolls-Royce was at one stage working with PZL to certify its Viper engine to power the type.

=== Controversy and curtailment ===
While the Polish Armed Forces were heavily impacted by curtailed budgets during the 1990s, the service intended to take delivery of five M-93K aircraft by the end of 1995, while plans for purchasing an additional six-to-eight Irydas were publicly discussed. At the time, there was an acknowledged desire for "around 40" jet trainers; the Polish Navy had also sought new trainer aircraft at this time.

On 1 December 1995, the Polish Government announced that the Polish Air Force would purchase no further aircraft due to it being too costly to continue. The Iryda's chief designer, Marek Potapowicz, openly stated that the programme's loss could lead to the collapse of PZL Mielec. That same month, a rival plan to procure second-hand Dassault/Dornier Alpha Jets for the Polish Air Force was officially suspended; the negative impact on Polish industry was apparently a major contributing factor to this decision. Nevertheless, competing trainers, including the Alpha Jet, Saab 105, and Aero L-39 Albatros, were demonstrated to Polish officials. PZL Mielec offered several improvements for the Iryda, including various aerodynamic improvements, such as leading-edge root extensions and trailing edge flaps, along with a costly SAGEM-sourced avionics suite.

During January 1996, funding was redirected by the Polish Government to support the Iryda programme; this was to not only to acquire additional aircraft but to finance upgrades to both the avionics and the engines. The prior month's decision to terminate the programme's backing had reportedly been overruled by Prime Minister Jozef Oleksy. According to aerospace industry periodical Flight International, Polish Air Force officials at one point were claiming the Iryda fleet to have achieved the highest serviceability statistics in the air force's inventory. However, Colonel Janusz Karpowicz of the Deblin pilot-training school criticised the Iryda for possessing longitudinally "heavy" controls, a relatively high approach speed, and the capability of its avionics.

In February 1996, the Polish Air Force grounded its Iryda fleet and froze its orders for the type following a fatal accident on 24 January of that year. The accident, which was reportedly the result of a trim-related issue, and its investigation became highly politicised. During March 1996, the Warsaw Institute of Aeronautics abandoned development of its new D-18A engine, which was intended to power future combat-orientated versions of the Iryda, reportedly due to market viability concerns. In April 1996, the programme was officially resumed in response to a fresh order from the Polish Air Force, which involved the purchase of six new-build aircraft and the retrofitting of 11 existing aircraft in air force service with improved engines, avionics and wings by 1998.

During October 1996, PZL-Mielec stated that it aimed for an upgraded prototype to be flown prior to the end of the year; the company also had ambitions to secure a follow-on order in the coming year, as well as for a modified maritime reconnaissance/strike version that were envisioned to replace the Polish Navy's fleet of MiG-21bis fighters. In June 1997, an Iryda flew for the first time with both the upgraded avionics package and the aerodynamic improvements. Full-scale flight testing of the upgraded aircraft was reportedly set to commence during August of that year; it was anticipated that the upgrade would be certified during 1998, after which the Polish Air Force would commence operational use of the type.

=== Cancellation and relaunch efforts ===
Relations between PZL-Mielec and the Polish Defense Ministry broke down in the second half of 1997, culminating in the company opting to sue the ministry over its alleged failure to honour the terms of a contract pertaining to the Iryda. While PZL-Mielec claimed that the Defense Ministry had demanded additional unfunded factory testing, the ministry accused the company of negligence, and claimed that the aircraft lacked necessary quality-control certification to be deemed safe for test flights. The prototype was grounded while legal action proceeded.

The Polish Air Force's procurement of the Iryda was formally cancelled in 1998, allegedly in response to the development difficulties experienced as well as the protracted shortage of funding that was common around this period; a key event that had reportedly contributed to its cancellation was the fatal crash in 1996. In the summer of 2002, PZL-Mielec relaunched development of the type, resuming flights of the Iryda on 22 July of that year, while attempting to gain interest and secure orders. Dubbed Iskra 2, it received a new Thales-supplied avionics suite and featured underwing hard points to enable it to carry armament, external fuel tanks, and other equipment.

== Operators ==
Poland

- Polish Air Force: 8 aircraft (1992-1996)

== Specifications (M93K) ==
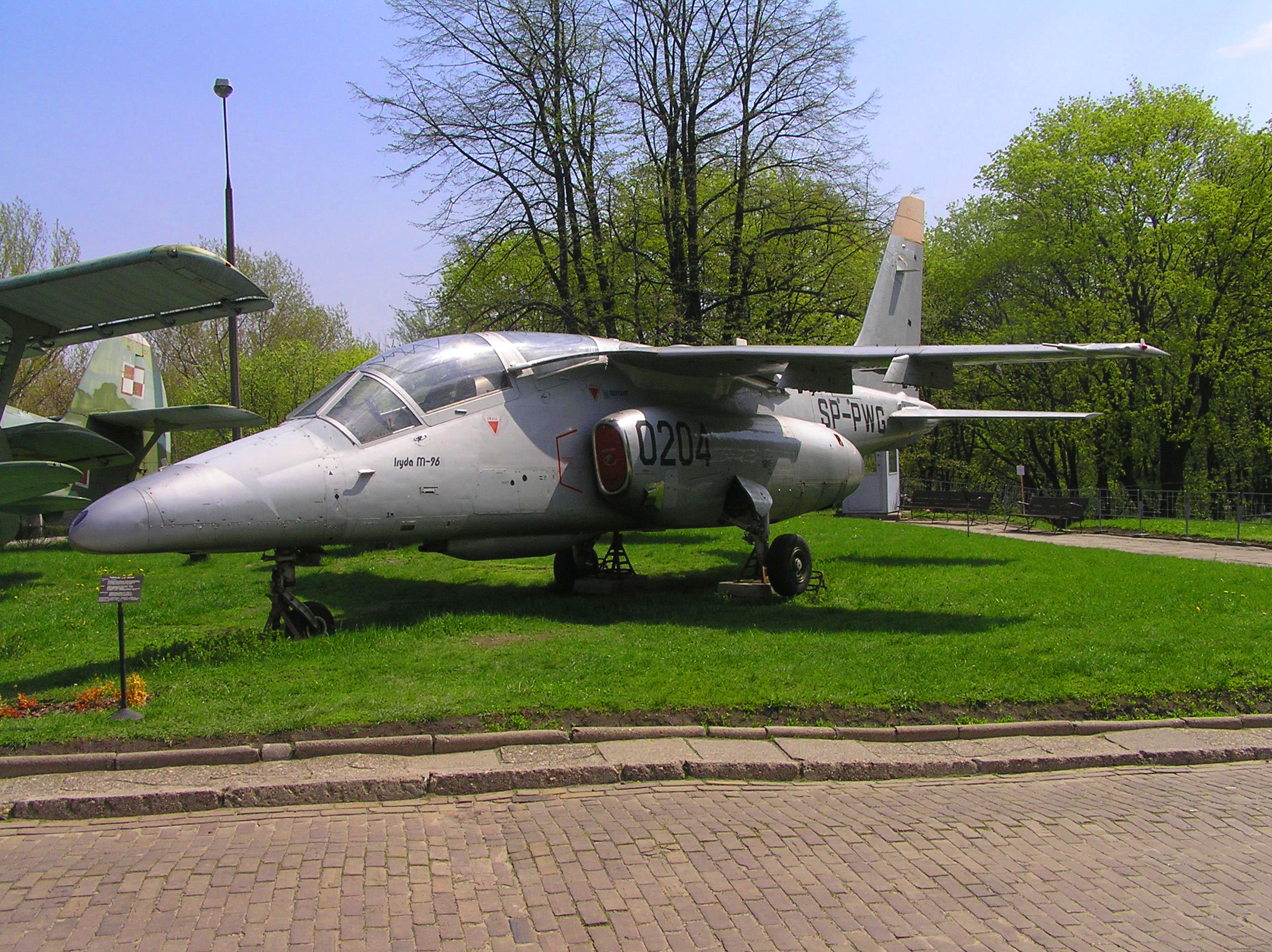
PZL I-22 Iryda

Data from Instytut Lotnictwa

General characteristics

- Crew: 2
- Length: 13.22 m (43 ft 4 in)
- Wingspan: 9.6 m (31 ft 6 in)
- Height: 4.3 m (14 ft 1 in)
- Wing area: 19.92 m^{2} (214.4 sq ft)
- Empty weight: 4,600 kg (10,141 lb)
- Gross weight: 6,650 kg (14,661 lb)
- Max takeoff weight: 7,500 kg (16,535 lb)
- Powerplant: 2 × PZL K-15 turbojet engines, 14.7 kN (3,300 lbf) thrust each

Performance

- Maximum speed: 940 km/h (580 mph, 510 kn) at 5,000 m (16,000 ft)
- Maximum speed: Mach 0.82
- Range: 1,200 km (750 mi, 650 nmi)
- Service ceiling: 13,700 m (44,900 ft)
- Rate of climb: 40.6 m/s (7,990 ft/min)
- Thrust/weight: 0.4

Armament

- Guns: 1 × 23 mm (0.906 in) GSh-23L cannon with 200 rounds
- Hardpoints: 4 × under-wing with a capacity of 2000 kg
- Rockets:
  - 57 mm (2.244 in) S-5
- Missiles:
  - R-60
- Bombs:
  - FAB-250
  - FAB-500

== See also ==
Aircraft of comparable role, configuration, and era

- Dassault-Breguet/Dornier Alpha Jet
- Aero L-39 Albatros
- BAE Hawk
- Soko G-4 Super Galeb
- FMA IA 63 Pampa
- Kawasaki T-4
