= Eastern Flank of NATO =

Eastern organization of NATO

Countries comprising NATO's eastern flank (Estonia, Latvia, Lithuania, Poland, Slovakia, Hungary, Romania, and Bulgaria)

NATO's Eastern Flank represents a group of countries located at the eastern part of the North Atlantic Treaty Organization. These states are: Estonia, Latvia, Lithuania, Poland, Slovakia, Hungary, Romania, and Bulgaria.

The countries of NATO's Eastern Flank share the unifying 20th-century historical experience of totalitarianism, the absence of freedoms, and the lack of the ability to determine their own policies. This also leads the Czech Republic to align itself with this group in terms of identity, even though it does not do so geographically.

These countries are NATO frontline states regarding Russia. Among them, the Baltic states lie along the line of contact with it.

== Political context ==
The 2014 Russian annexation of Crimea, together with Russia's invasion of Ukraine in 2022, have permanently altered the security environment in Europe and transformed Russia into a country characterized by a pattern of aggressive actions against its neighbors and the transatlantic community. For the countries of the flank, Russia represents a constant threat.

There is a political consensus within the Alliance regarding the defense of the Eastern Flank (a consensus evident since the 2014 NATO Summit in Wales), yet there is no unity of views on how it should be reinforced. Moreover, from the perspective of the Alliance's southern states (Italy, Spain, Portugal and Greece), NATO is doing too little to ensure their security compared to its actions in the East, given that terrorism, migration and instability constitute sources of vulnerability for the Southern Flank.

As early as the 2016 NATO Summit in Warsaw, the organization decided to deploy multinational forces led by framework nations on a rotational basis, as part of NATO’s Enhanced Forward Presence along the Eastern Flank. However, the need for permanent assurance for the states in that region persisted subsequently.

The role of NATO’s Enhanced Forward Presence forces, well-armed and strategically positioned, yet too small in number to launch an offensive operation is essentially symbolic, intended to demonstrate the allies' solidarity with and commitment to their eastern flank. The intended effect is to signal that, in the event of a Russian military escalation, hostile troops would face forces from, if not all, the majority of allied nations. This would make it highly likely that the Alliance would respond immediately and collectively, including the nuclear powers. As of 2017, however, there was still no consensus regarding the permanent deployment of NATO troops, a measure requested by the countries on the flank but not agreed to at the time (in the spirit of the NATO-Russia Founding Act) by countries such as France and Germany.

Russia viewed the Enhanced Forward Presence as an element of military escalation that was provocative, offensive, and threatening to its security, and which violated the terms of the NATO-Russia agreement regarding the non-deployment of substantial permanent troops in former Warsaw Pact countries. Consequently, it responded by militarizing the Kaliningrad Oblast and conducting additional military exercises. In turn, NATO currently regards Russia as the most significant and direct threat to peace, stability, and security in the Euro-Atlantic region.

== The situation on the ground ==
=== NATO forces ===
Eight battalion-sized battlegroups have been deployed, each to one of the flank states, with deployments in the Baltic states and Poland dating back to 2017, and the remainder following Russia's invasion of Ukraine in 2022. These battlegroups are not identical, their personnel strength and composition depend on geographical factors and specific threats (between 2017 and 2022, the deployment in the southeastern sector of the NATO flank took the form of a "Tailored Forward Presence," designed to enhance situational awareness, adaptability, and responsiveness).

Following the 2022 NATO Summit in Brussels, it was decided that the total force under direct NATO command deployed along the Eastern Flank would consist of 40,000 troops, supplemented by significant air and naval assets. At the 2022 NATO Summit in Madrid, it was agreed that, where and when necessary, the size of the battlegroups would be increased to the brigade level. Air and naval forces, as well as additional troops beyond those of the Enhanced Forward Presence, were also deployed to the region.

Furthermore, it was decided at the same summit that these forces would be supported by credible, rapidly available reinforcements and the pre-positioning of equipment and weapon systems (including heavy weapons), additional stocks (including fuel),, improving command and control structures, as well as establishing division-level structures. Regarding the additional pre-allocated forces, although they will be designated for a specific territory within the Eastern Flank region, not all will be permanently stationed there. Instead, they will regularly train and develop their capabilities and interoperability with host-nation forces on-site, on a rotational basis.

=== US forces ===
The United States, for its part, has decided to permanently deploy the headquarters of the V Corps, a garrison headquarters, and a support battalion to Poland, alongside its existing rotational forces: an armored brigade combat team, elements of a combat aviation brigade, and a division headquarters.

In the Baltic states, the US has decided to strengthen its rotational presence.

Furthermore, the US has decided to deploy an additional brigade, along with its headquarters, to Romania, supplementing the Stryker armored squadron deployed there in February 2022. These forces are in addition to the US troops present for force projection or training purposes at military bases in Romania and Bulgaria under bilateral agreements signed in 2006.

== Measures ==
Among the useful applicable measures regarding the Eastern Flank are:

- a strategy regarding Russia based on unity, deterrence, and resilience
- the creation of a military-style Schengen area that would facilitate the unhindered movement of troops, technical assets, and equipment towards the east.
- the establishment of permanent Alliance troops, alongside those in Poland and the Baltic states, all the more so given that the NATO-Russia Founding Act has become anachronistic.

NATO forces deployed in the East require rapid access to reinforcements. However, the movement of NATO troops, hardware, and equipment across Europe to the Eastern Flank currently poses a logistical challenge, driven by both the bureaucratic hurdles of European states and deficiencies in planning, control, and the quality of communications links leading eastward. In this context, the view held in 2017 was that the inability to rapidly move significant numbers of troops and military equipment across Europe, combined with Russia’s anti-access and area-denial, rendered the Eastern Flank incapable of withstanding Russian intimidation or an actual attack.

Due to poor rail, road, and airport infrastructure, the level of military mobility within the Bucharest Format countries remains low as of 2023. This negatively impacts NATO’s capabilities regarding force projection, mobility, and resilience against a potential attack by Russian forces, as well as its ability to generate, transport, and regenerate forces in the region. This structural weakness is the subject of several European-level initiatives, such as the program to build a network of European military logistics hubs under PESCO, or the Polish project to create a multimodal transport complex, integrating air, rail, and highway networks—known as the Solidarity Transport Hub. The latter project aims to establish Poland as a mobility hub in Central Europe, particularly along the axis stretching from the Baltic Sea to the Aegean Sea, while simultaneously positioning it as an ideal candidate to serve as the military logistics center for Eastern Europe (thereby cementing Poland’s role as a strategic pillar of European security).

== See also ==
- NATO Enhanced Forward Presence
- Operation Eastern Sentry
