= Inspector of the Air Force (Poland) =

Chief of the Polish Air Force

- Inspektor Sił Powietrznych (Polish)
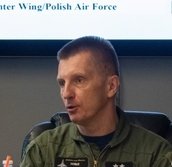
- Incumbent; Divisional General Ireneusz Nowak since 1 March 2023
- Polish Air Force
- Reports to: Chief of the General Staff
- Precursor: Commander of the Air Force
- Formation: 1918

The Inspector of the Air Force (Polish: Inspektor Sił Powietrznych) is the chief of the Polish Air Force.

== List of officeholders ==
No.	Portrait	Name (born–died)	Term of office			Ref.
No.	Portrait	Name (born–died)	Took office	Left office	Time in office	Ref.
Commander of the Air Force
1		Hipolit Łossowski (1881–1925)	1918	1919	0–1 years	
Commander of the Air Force
1		Ryszard Olszewski (1948–2022)	2004	2005	0–1 years	
Inspector of the Air Force
1		Jan Śliwka (born 1961)	1 January 2014	28 January 2016	2 years, 27 days	
2		Tomasz Drewniak (born 1964)	28 January 2016	17 November 2016	294 days	
3		Cezary Wiśniewski (born 1969)	18 November 2016	17 April 2017	150 days	
4		Mirosław Jemielniak (born 1964)	10 April 2017	30 August 2018	4 years, 191 days	
5		Jacek Pszczoła (born 1967)	31 August 2018	31 January 2023	4 years, 153 days	
6		Ireneusz Nowak (born 1972)	1 March 2023	Incumbent	3 years, 190 days	
