= Polish arms sales to Republican Spain =

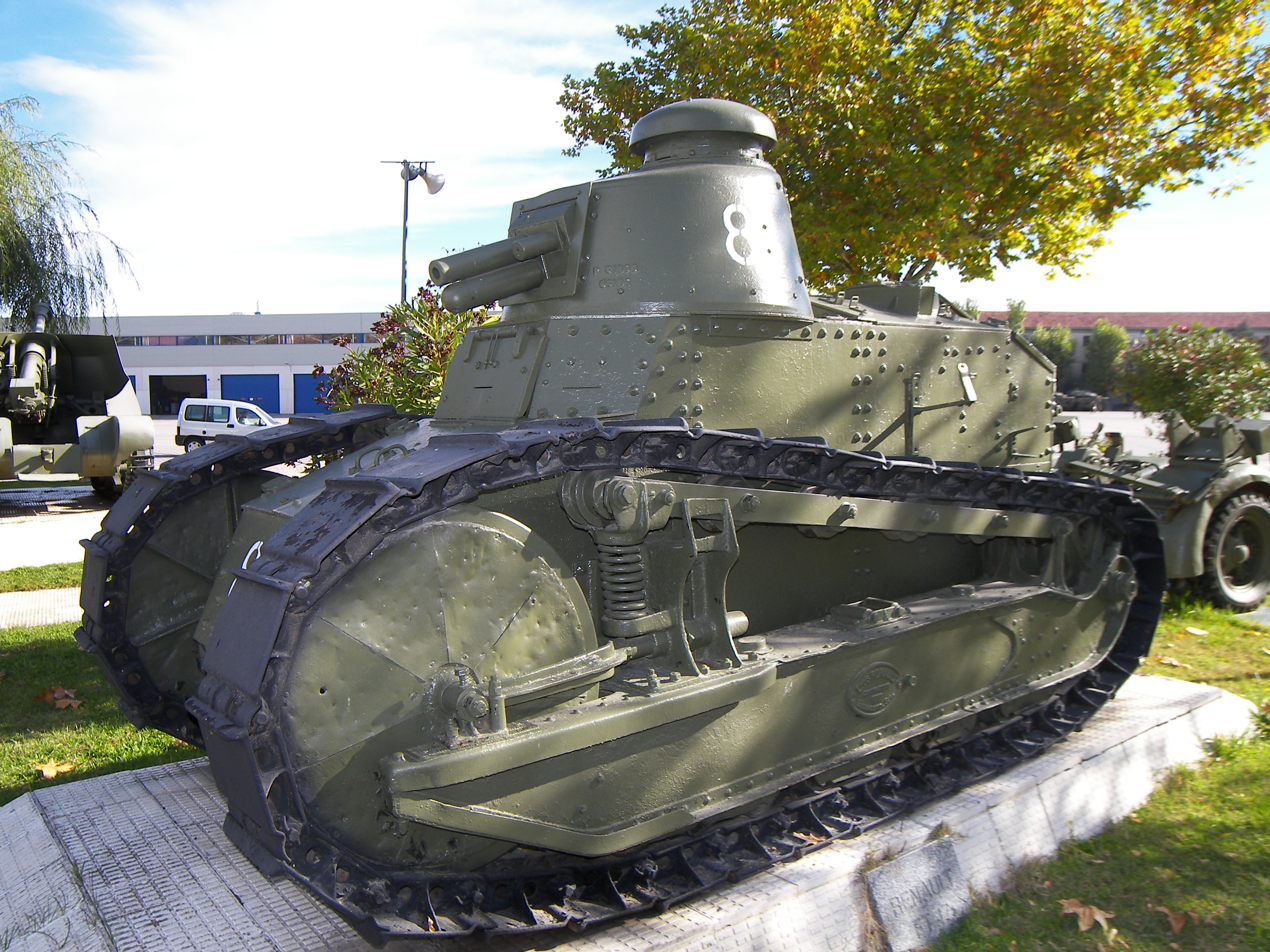
A Polish Renault FT that was in Republican service

Polish arms sales to Republican Spain took place between September 1936 and February 1939 during the Spanish Civil War. Poland sold weapons to the Republicans. Since Poland was bound by non-intervention obligations, Polish governmental officials and the military disguised sales as commercial transactions mediated by international brokers and targeting customers in various countries, principally in Latin America; there are 54 shipments from Danzig and Gdynia identified.

Most hardware sold were obsolete and worn-out second-rate weapons, though there were also some modern arms delivered; all were 20-30% overpriced. Polish sales amounted to $40m and constituted some 5-7% of overall Republican military spendings, though in terms of quantity certain categories of weaponry, like machine-guns, might have accounted for 50% of all arms delivered. After the USSR, Poland was the second largest arms supplier for the Republic. After the USSR, Italy and Germany, Poland was the 4th largest arms supplier to the war-engulfed Spain.

== Background ==
=== Antecedents ===
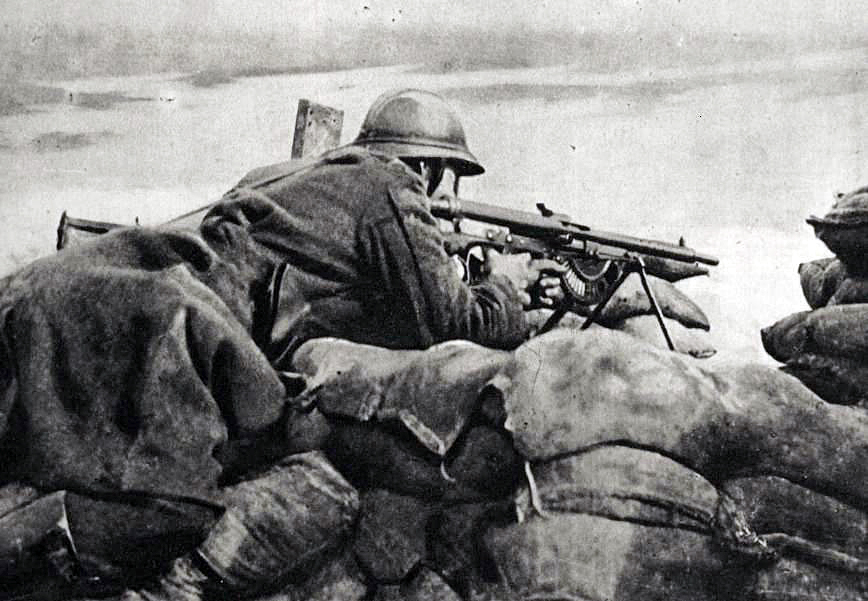
Chauchat 8 mm LMG in Belgian service

Prior to outbreak of the Spanish Civil War there was very little interaction - either in terms of conflict or co-operation - between Spain and Poland. Both countries operated in entirely different geo-political zones and their interests did not coincide. Mutual relations were reduced to very meager trade exchange (in both cases below 0,5% of the overall foreign trade volume), diplomatic maneuvers within the League of Nations (competition for permanent seat in the Council led to Spanish temporary withdrawal from the organization; other issues included the question of Tangier in case of Spain or the question of national minorities in case of Poland), and typical consular problems (e.g. properties of Spanish aristocrats in Poland or demi-world of Polish shady traders and prostitutes, mostly of Jewish origin, resident in Catalonia). Both states maintained their diplomatic representations in respective capitals, though not at the embassy level. Internal political developments in either Spain or Poland were duly acknowledged; fall of liberal democracy, Primo dictatorship and arrival of the Second Republic did not cause any particular reaction in Warsaw; similarly Piłsudski's coup and further increasing authoritarian and dictatorial evolution of the government in Warsaw did not trigger any response in Madrid. However, in the early 1930s the Polish trading conglomerate SEPEWE, made of companies from the arms industry and controlled by the Polish general staff, a number of times approached the Spanish army and police offering tankettes, hand grenades, training aircraft and communication equipment, but it kept losing to foreign competitors, who usually operated their own manufacturing facilities in Spain.

=== Warsaw diplomacy and the Spanish Civil War ===
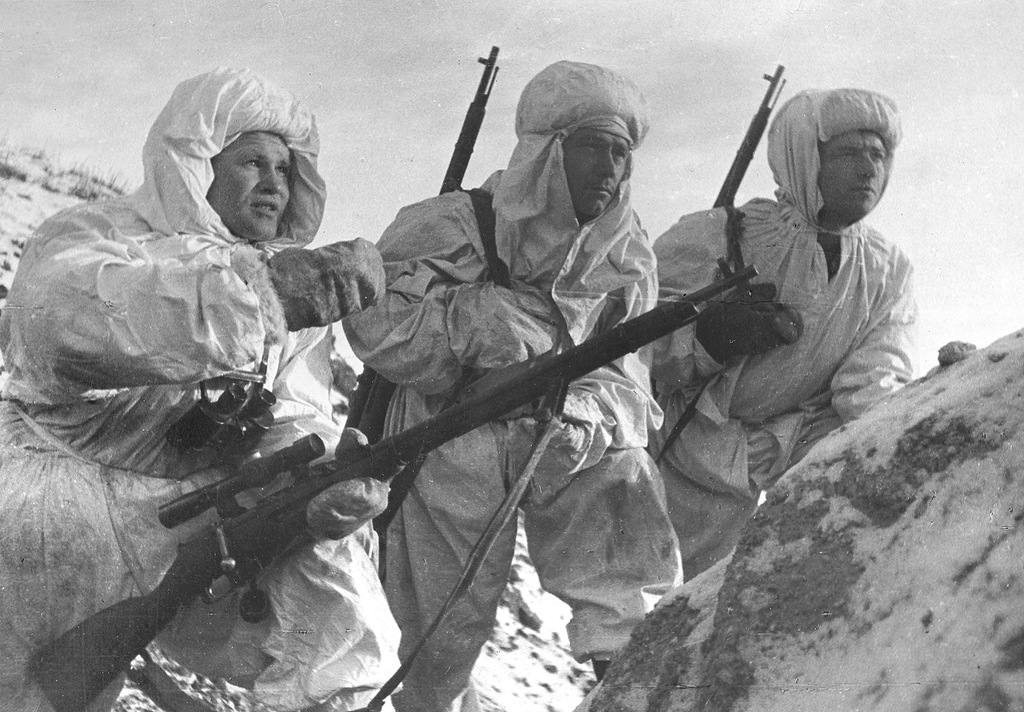
Mosin-Nagant rifle (sniper version) in Soviet service

One of two fundamental principles of the Polish interwar diplomacy – apart from remaining equidistant towards Germany and the USSR - was cultivating the political-military alliance with France, the only reliable Polish ally. Hence, in cases where no specific Polish interest was at stake, Warsaw tended to side with Paris. When France embarked on the non-intervention policy towards the Spanish Civil War, Poland soon followed suit, though in some specific and usually minor issues the Polish diplomacy might have sided with Italy, considered a rather friendly country. In general terms Poland calculated that co-operation between Britain, France, Italy and Germany in enforcement of non-intervention was highly desirable, since it worked towards political stability on the continent.

No specific potential political gains to be achieved in Spain have been identified by the Poles and it has been decided that in principle, Warsaw should stick to neutrality and refrain from supporting any of the warring sides. In terms of problems the Poles were gradually getting concerned about the growing Soviet influence in Spain, which triggered some anti-Soviet Polish votes at the Non-Intervention Committee. The German engagement caused much less anxiety, though some Polish diplomats had misgivings about France being potentially surrounded by 3 hostile neighbors. Earlier Polish historiography speculated that these concerns might have triggered secret arms sales to the Republic, but this theory is no longer maintained. Some Polish decision-makers believed that as long as Germany and the USSR were engaged in Spain they were unlikely to embark on aggressive policy in Eastern Europe, but there is no evidence that such speculations shaped the official Polish stand.

=== Two Spains and Poland ===
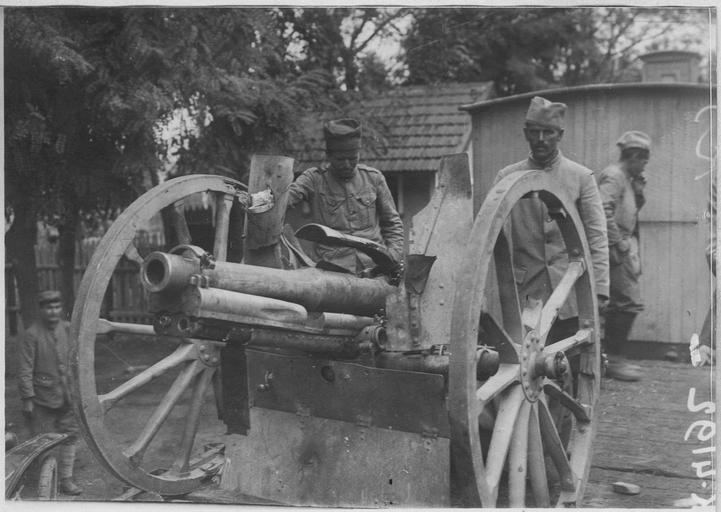
Schneider 75mm gun in Greek service

The Republic continuously maintained official diplomatic relations with Poland. The pre-war Spanish minister in Warsaw and its first secretary sided with the rebels; following 7 months when the second secretary was in charge, since March 1937 the mission was taken over by 3 successive envoys acting as charge d’affaires. The Polish minister in Madrid in late 1936 set his residence in Saint-Jean-de-Luz, like most of the diplomatic corps did. He refused invitation to settle in Valencia and until the end of the conflict operated from France, last visiting the Republican territory in late 1937. The Madrid mission was headed by chargé d'affaires, who became the key interface between the republican Foreign Ministry and the Polish diplomacy. Poland ceased to recognize Republican Spain in mid-February 1939; the Madrid mission was closed and evacuated in few days.

The Cabanellas’ message to Warsaw which notified emergence of Junta Nacional was ignored by the Polish diplomacy. Since October 1936 the former second secretary of Spanish diplomatic representation in Budapest started to act as unofficial Nationalists’ representative in Warsaw; he had access to lower-level officials of Ministry of Foreign Affairs and enjoyed increasingly favorable treatment. In Nationalist Spain initially the Polish mission in Lisbon maintained sporadic contacts with the Burgos administration. Since mid-1937 its employee became the first unofficial Polish representative, resident mostly in San Sebastián; also the Polish minister with the republican government became increasingly engaged in parallel contacts with the Nationalists. In October 1938 Poland recognized Nationalist Spain de facto, and in February 1939 de iure.

=== Republic seeking arms ===
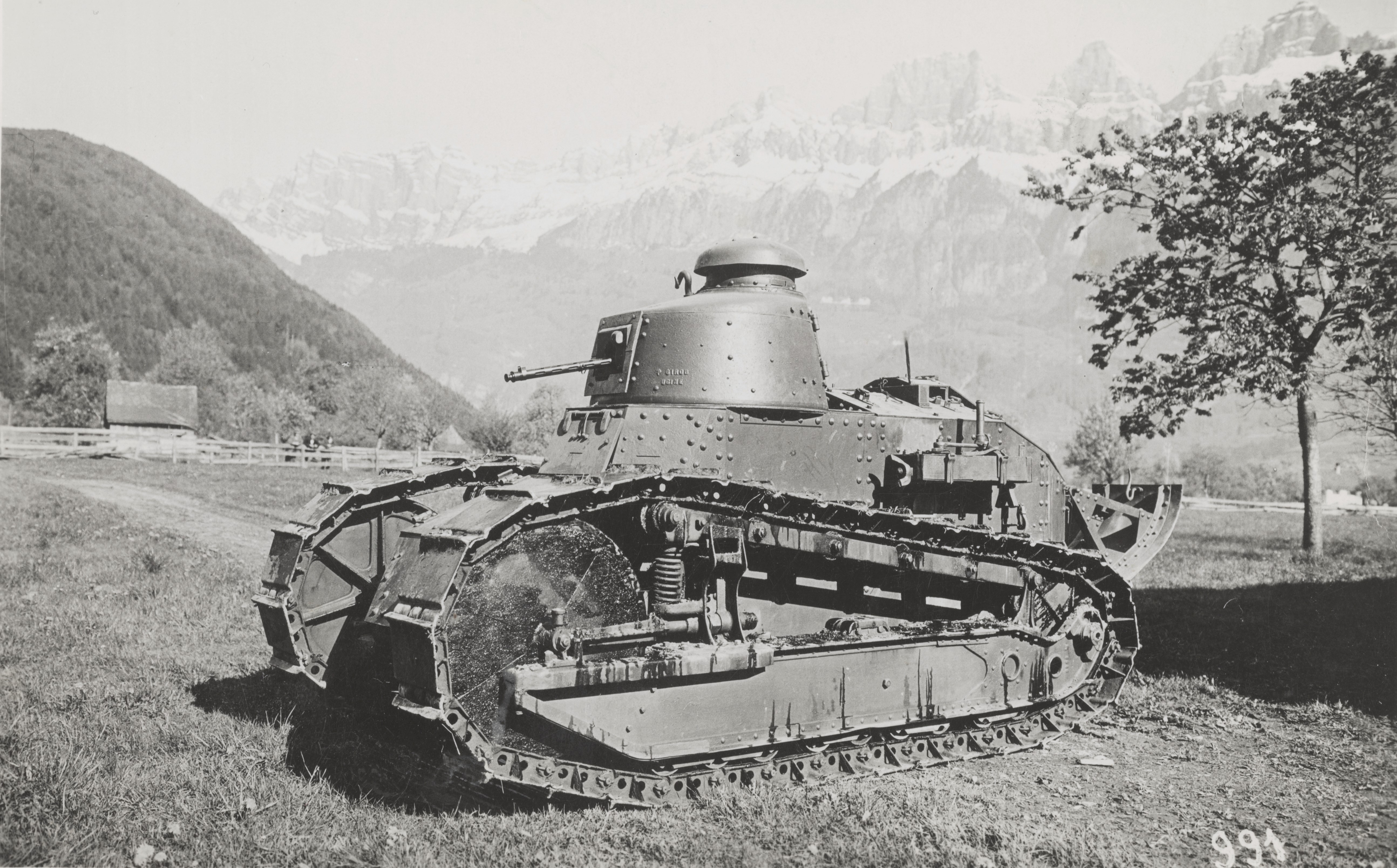
Renault FT 17 (WK1 version) tank in Swiss service

The republican administration immediately realized that they might face shortage of arms when confronting the military rebellion. The prime minister José Giral turned to the French government requesting arms sales already on July 20, 1936. However, the cabinet of Leon Blum soon adopted the non-intervention policy and imports of French materiel became highly uncertain. The Republicans tried to pull as many strings as possible when looking for alternatives, and on July 25 they turned to the Soviet embassy in Paris. On July 29 latest the government approached the Polish diplomatic mission in Madrid requesting sales of Polish aircraft; the Spaniards were prepared to pay any price, but required immediate delivery, which triggered the negative response. On August 13 colonel Alfredo de Sanjuán arrived in Warsaw seeking massive arms purchases; it is unclear whether he represented the Catalan autonomous government or the general staff. Sanjuán suggested to SEPEWE that in view of French declarations, transaction be organised as fictitious sales to Uruguay, but for unclear reason his mission produced no results. Another aviator, colonel Luis Riaño Herrero, arrived in Warsaw on August 18 as official envoy of the Giral government; he requested sales of aircraft, but SEPEWE turned him down. There is no confirmed information on further direct Spanish-Polish talks and mechanics of the Polish decision-making process, which was taking place in late August 1936, is not reconstructed. Already on August 22 it was known that a Mexican ship would shortly call at Danzig to load Polish arms; on August 27 Poland officially joined the non-intervention agreement, and on September 9 the first shipment of Polish arms set off. It is not clear whether Polish decision-makers consciously decided to play a double game or whether both decisions were taken independently by the diplomacy and the military, though MFA was soon involved.

== Arms for the Republic ==
=== Order-to-cash ===
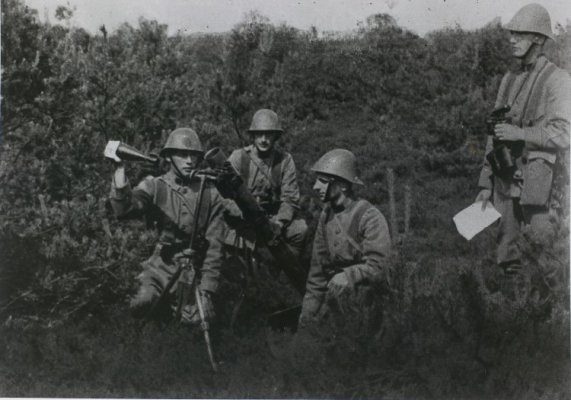
Brandt Mle 27/31 81 mm mortar in Dutch service

The entire order-to-cash process has not been fully reconstructed and apart from contacts in July and August 1936, no other direct arms dealings between two countries are identified. From September 1936 onwards all contacts were executed via intermediaries. It is not clear which unit of the Spanish republican administration or who personally was co-ordinating the process, though it seems the embassy in Paris was heavily involved. None of the sources consulted clarifies the mechanics of financial settlements between the Spanish government and the companies acting as brokers, especially whether payments were made in advance or on delivery. The brokers were usually established international arms traders: Handelmaatschappij S. Gokkes (Netherlands), Etablissements Alexandre Klaguine, Etablissements Edgar Brandt (France), Edgar Grimard (Belgium), Willy Daugs und Cie., Navigation Josef Veltjens KG, Matthias Rohde Frachtkontor (Germany) and other. Their partner in Poland was SEPEWE, and mostly its deputy director Kazimierz Zarębski; he operated with much autonomy, though the syndicate co-ordinated its dealings with the Polish military and the MFA. In case of the former the units which provided supervision were Section I (organization and logistics) and Section II (intelligence and counter-intelligence) of the General Staff. In case of the latter because of sensitive nature of the deal at times deputy minister or even the minister of foreign affairs Józef Beck intervened personally. Payments were usually made to SEPEWE accounts via established French banks. Some dealings were executed beyond SEPEWE with smaller Polish traders, e.g. a London-based entrepreneur Stefan Czarnecki set up Towarzystwo dla Handlu i Przemysłu Surowcowego and even became the honorary consul of Nicaragua, a move which facilitated his arms trade with both the Nationalists and the Republicans. However, he traded mostly in Czechoslovak and Austrian weapons and his trade volume was insignificant compared to this of SEPEWE.

=== Logistics ===
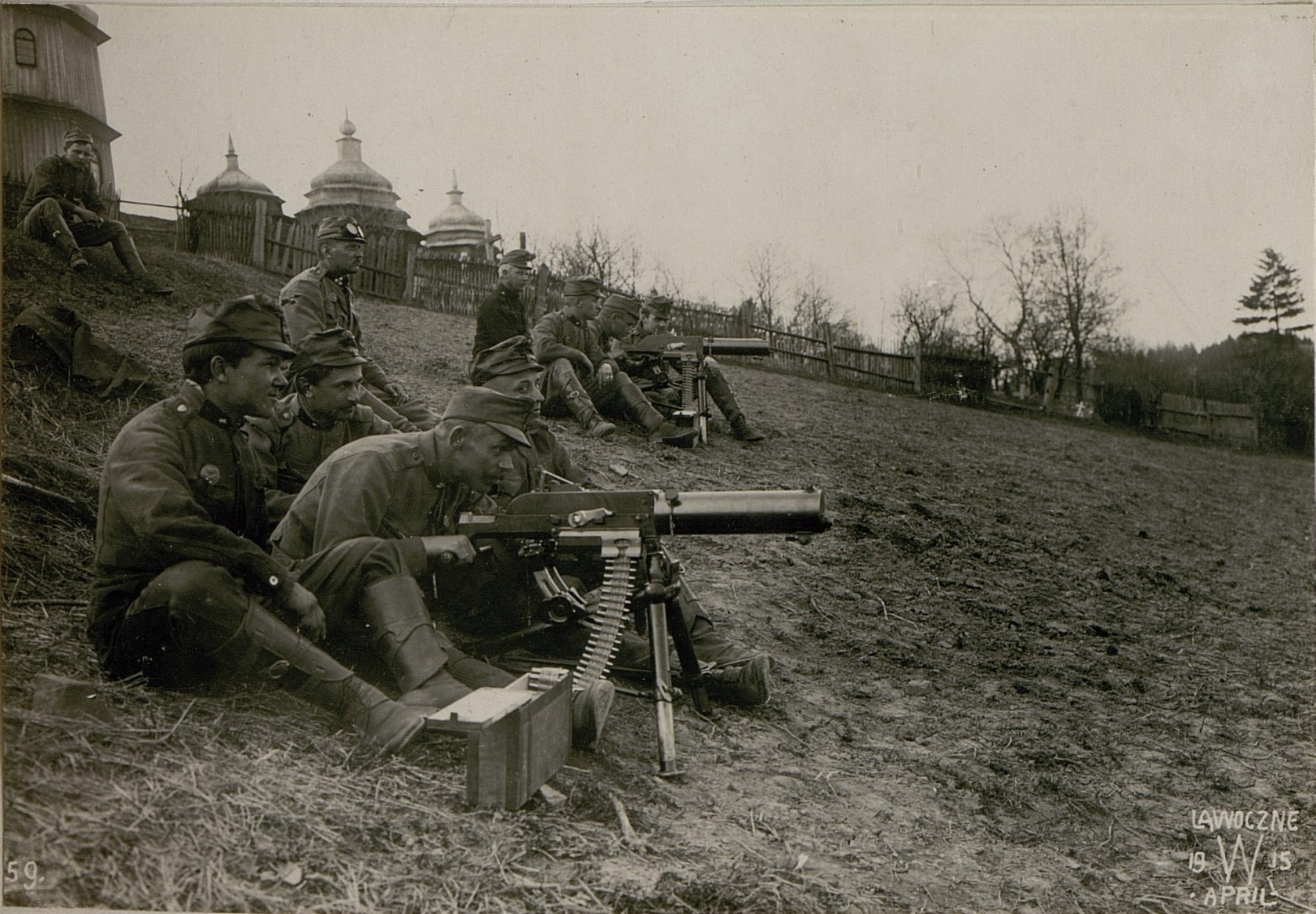
Schwarzlose machine gun in Austro-Hungarian service

All transport went by sea. There have been 54 naval shipments from Poland to Republican Spain identified; the first ship set off on September 9, 1936 (some 3 weeks before the first Soviet shipment set off), and the last one around February 9, 1939. 12 shipments took place in 1936, 27 in 1937, 14 in 1938 and 1 in 1939. The entire maritime route usually took around a week to the Atlantic ports and 2 weeks to the Mediterranean ones. Initially 8 ships were loaded in the extraterritorial Polish military depot at Westerplatte, in the Free City of Danzig; all the remaining ones departed from Gdynia. Officially they were directed mostly to customers in Uruguay (12 cases identified), Mexico (7), Greece (6) and France (5), though also in a few cases to China, Germany and Haiti; in some 20 cases the official destination has not been identified by scholars. Official documentation confirming orders from representatives of fake target countries was obtained by brokers, usually by means of bribes – especially that also honorary consuls were entitled to issue certificates – or forgery. In some cases there were Soviet agents involved when providing false cover. Most ships were registered in Panama (20), some in the Netherlands, Greece and France, and a few in Norway, Germany, Latvia, Estonia or Yugoslavia. Almost all the ships made it to their port of destination; until the spring of 1937 they were mostly Santander and Bilbao, afterwards the Levantine (Barcelona, Alicante, Valencia, Cartagena) or French ports, especially Honfleur. In a few cases ships were seized by the Nationalist navy; in 1 case the ship-owner was bribed by the Nationalists. It is estimated that some 8% of Polish shipments were intercepted by the Nationalists. To maintain secrecy, at one point the Poles considered re-routing the shipments by rail to the Romanian port of Constanța, but the plan was eventually dropped.

=== Arms and equipment ===
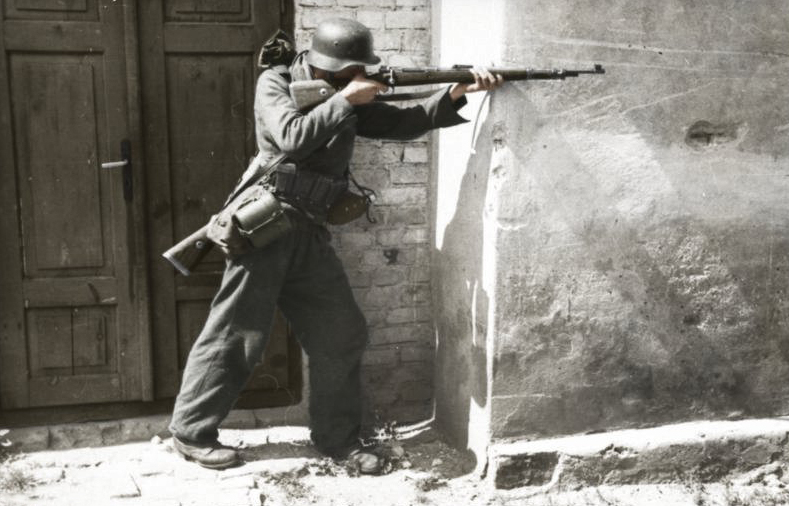
Mauser Karabiner 98k 7.92 mm rifle in German service

There is no complete and reliable information on arms sold by Poland; official Polish documentation was partially lost during World War Two and detailed data is reconstructed on basis of fragmentary archives, Nationalist intelligence reports, private accounts and some Spanish republican papers. All sources agree, however, that the arms sold were mostly obsolete; they were seized or acquired by the Polish army from Bolshevik, Russian, Austro-Hungarian or French armed forces in 1918–1920, and withdrawn from service as the Polish army was getting modernized. The Polish supplies to Republican Spain included: 95 tanks (Renault FT 17), 300 guns and howitzers (Schneider, Krupp-Putilov, Bergson, Škoda), 500 mortars (Brandt Mle 27/31, Stokes 81 mm and other types), 15,000 machine guns (Bergmann LMG, Browning BAR, Chauchat, Colt, Polish-made CKM wz. 30, Lewis LMG, Maxim-Spandau, Polish-designed PWU, Schwarzlose, Vickers), 200,000 rifles (Enfield .303, Mauser 29, 88 and 98, Mannlicher 88/80, 90 and 95, Mosin-Nagant, Lebel 8 mm, Berthier 07/15 and 16 and other), 1,5m hand grenades (mostly Polish-made wz. 31), 0.8m artillery rounds (various types), 180m rifle cartridges (various types), 1,800 tons of gunpowder, 230 tons of TNT, 75 tons of aerial bombs, plus some quantities of bayonets, torpedoes and land mines. Shipments included also spare parts and components, especially for artillery pieces. Apart from arms, Poles were selling also uniforms, helmets, shoes, gas masks, optical equipment, leather products, blankets and other accessories. Poland did not sell any aircraft to the Republic – instead, 44 obsolete or non-combat aircraft were sold to the Nationalists via Portugal in 1936 (20 PWS-10 training fighters, 20 Breguet XIX light bombers, 4 RWD-13 liaison aircraft).

=== Quality issue ===
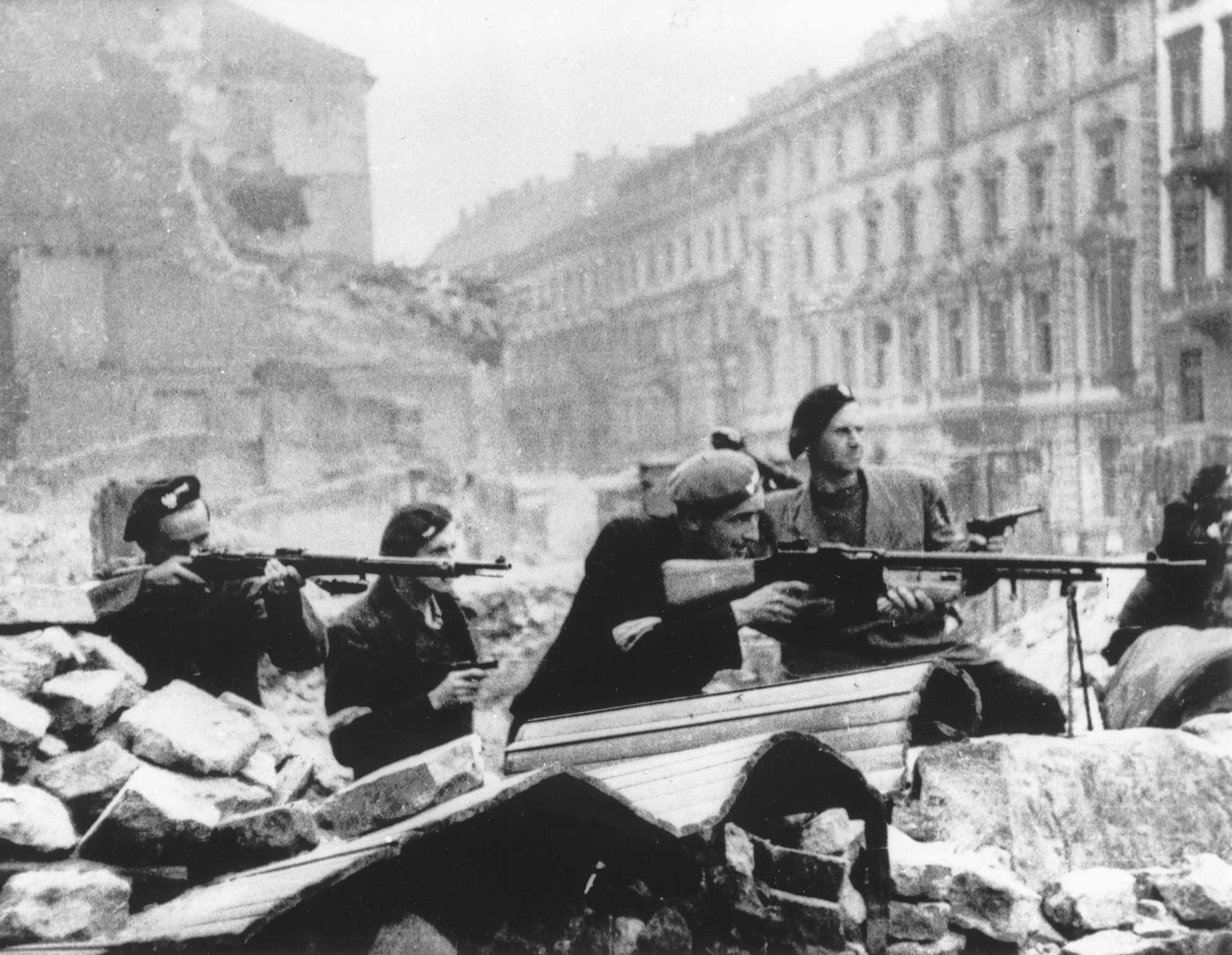
Browning BAR LMG in Polish service

Opinion about poor quality of arms from Poland was popular in the republican zone. Historiographic works usually also underline that SEPEWE weapons were second-rate materiel up to the point of having been unusable altogether. Some scholars suggest that the Poles deliberately engineered a fraud, either selling defective weapons or making sure that the good ones are intercepted by the Nationalists; author of a recent monograph refers to Poles as "malhechores". The opinion pointing to inferior or even substandard quality is upheld by Polish scholars, though it is applied more cautiously to most or at least many products delivered. They underline that arms sold were in vast majority unwanted by the Polish army and remained in warehouses, at times for many years. Most were withdrawn from service as obsolete and unfit for modern warfare; produced at times in the late 19th century and acquired by the Poles some 20 years earlier, they had been phased out as the Polish army was getting modernized. They were largely worn out, and poor maintenance contributed to their low quality. Some were new products, but refused by the army as unreliable, non-standard, incomplete or even faulty.

There are scholars who claim that opinion about poor quality is at least overemphasized. They maintain that 30-year-old weapons are common in technology-dependent armies of today, especially that most arms sold by Poland were unsophisticated categories like rifles or hand grenades. It is noted that technical incompetence in militia-dominated Republican troops combined with corruption, poor logistics and makeshift maintenance services often prevented effective usage of arms, and that the Nationalists extensively used seized and aged Polish imports, like the Chauchat submachine guns. Some products were state-of-the-art weaponry; the Browning BAR machine guns seized by the Germans in September 1939 were used by Wehrmacht until 1945. Finally, it is claimed that alleged poor quality was used as easy excuse for poor Republican military performance.

=== Political problems ===
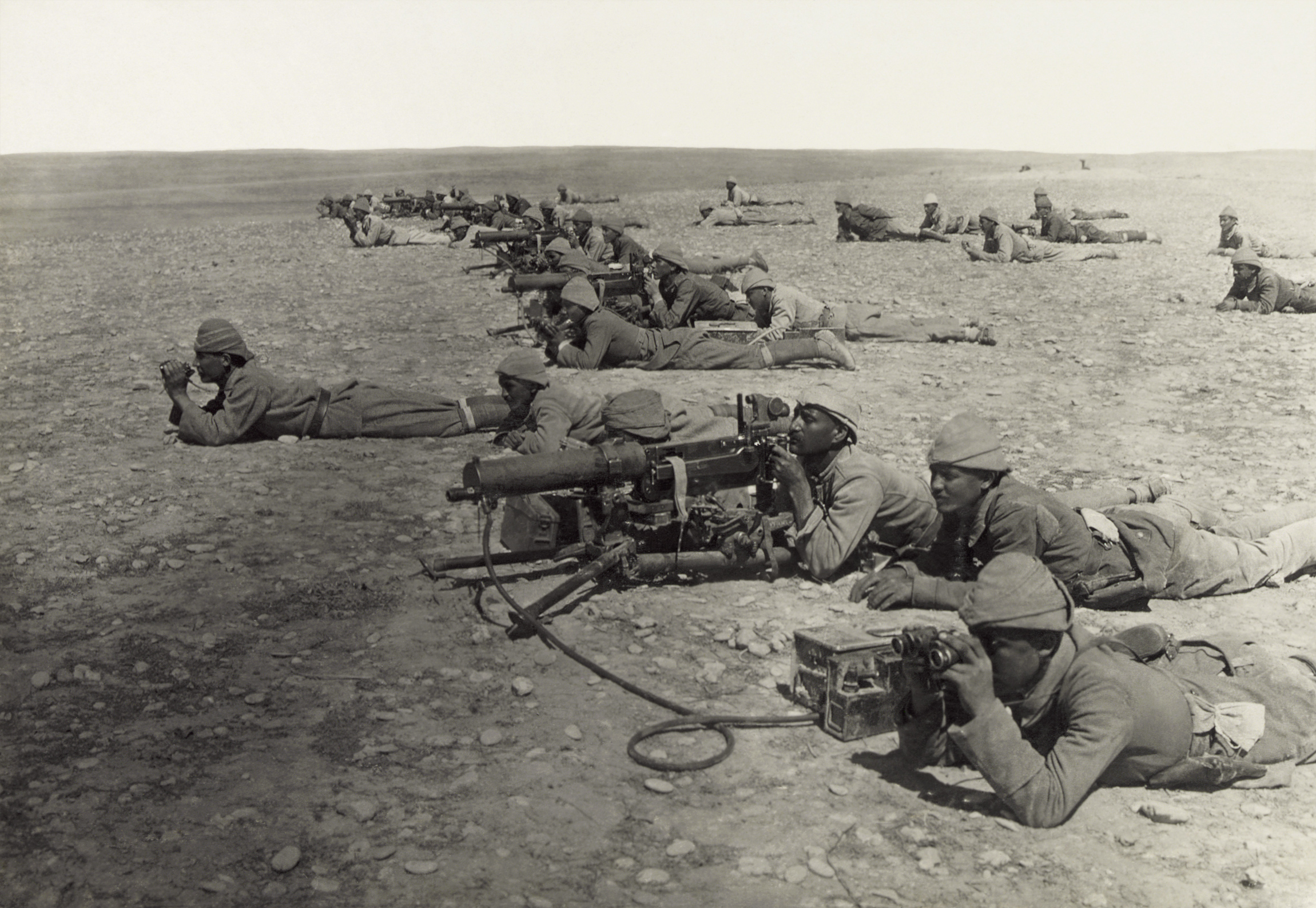
Maxim-Spandau HMG in Turkish service

Poland joined the non-intervention declaration and sales of materiel to Spain was incompatible with Polish obligations. However, there is no information on Polish trade having been subject of discussions at the Non-Intervention Committee or during official bilateral contacts. This was so despite the fact that sales ceased to be a secret already in late 1936, e.g. Polish representatives in Rome were informally approached by Italian military in this regard. Also international press, e.g. the Dutch De Telegraaf, published similar information. The Nationalists had very detailed information about Polish shipments; its source is unclear. Over time they were becoming increasingly bold over supplies to the Republicans. Polish unofficial representatives and military envoys in the Nationalist zone were treated to decreasingly polite complaints and some facilities were denied to them on the ground of Polish supplies to “the Reds”. Also the Nationalist representative in Warsaw kept making representations to the MFA; however, as in bilateral relations the primary Nationalist objective was diplomatic recognition, they could have not afforded more decisive stand. The routine Polish reply was that the country maintained its non-intervention obligations, and that once the ship left Gdynia, responsibility for cargo was with the trading company. Eventually the foreign minister Beck concluded that further sales to the Republic would irreparably damage future relations with the Franco regime and in the summer of 1938 he demanded from SEPEWE that the supplies be terminated. Exact decision-making process has not been reconstructed, but it seems that the military enjoyed more weight than MFA; sales continued and the last ship departed Gdynia 7 days prior to Polish de iure recognition of Nationalist Spain.

== Impact ==
=== Military impact ===
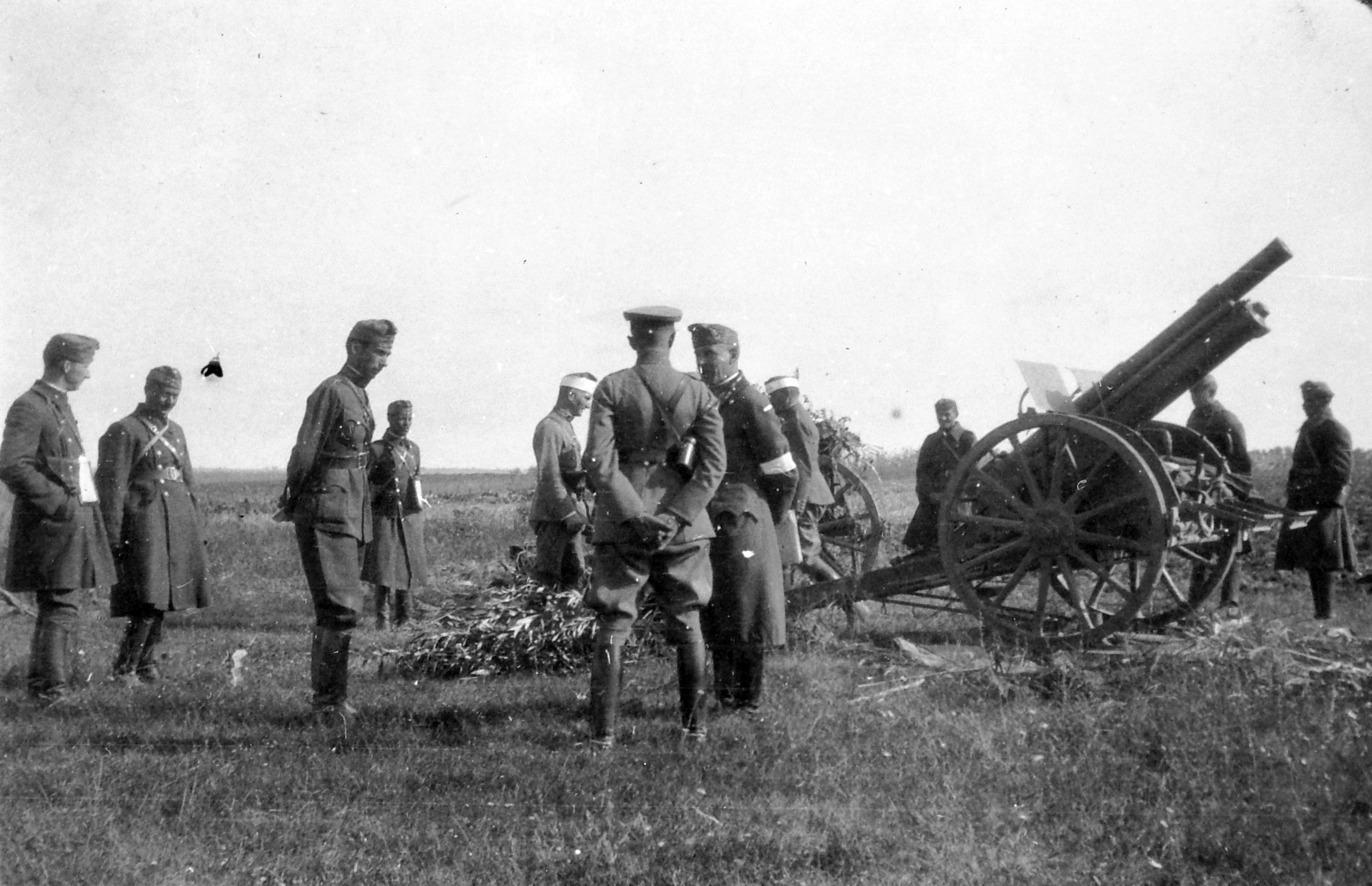
Skoda 100 mm howitzer in Hungarian service

For the Republican army in terms of some categories Polish arms came in much smaller quantity compared to Soviet deliveries: tanks, rifle cartridges or artillery shells made some 20-25% of the Soviet ones. For some types of equipment like artillery pieces or rifles the ratio was closer to 50%, for some (machine guns) equal, and for some – like hand grenades or explosives – the Polish deliveries exceeded the Soviet ones. However, arms delivered from Poland were often of lower quality, e.g. tanks were obsolete French models from the First World War, while the Soviets delivered mainstream T-26 or even innovative BT-series machines. Also artillery pieces, machine guns or rifles sold by Poland were mostly of pre-war Austrian, French or Russian production, though the Soviets similarly seized the opportunity to clear their depots from obsolete pre-war stocks and overpriced even more, by 30-40%. Spanish complaints about quality of Polish weapons were commonplace and at times they bordered charges of sabotage. Moreover, the vast array of models sold (especially artillery, machine-guns and rifles) produced logistics problems in terms of spare parts and shells/cartridges.

For the Polish military the supplies to Spain proved an excellent deal, as with some exceptions, the army cleared its warehouses of unwanted hardware and sold it at prices appropriate rather for modern weapons. Sales of weaponry freshly off production lines had minor adverse effect on deliveries to the Polish army, which still badly needed further re-armament into newer equipment. The issue was discussed by the General Staff and its experts concluded that the financial gain resulting was worth some delay in domestic supplies. However, in May 1939 the Poles wanted some undelivered arms back.

=== Financial impact ===
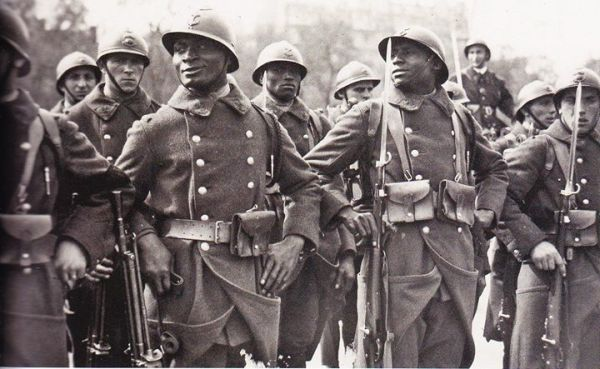
Berthier 07/15 8 mm rifles in French service

For SEPEWE, a syndicate which before 1936 struggled to sell arms and targeted underdeveloped countries like Romania or Turkey, sales to Republican Spain was excellent business. Obsolete or poor quality hardware, for years gathering dust in military warehouses, were sold highly above the market price. They produced 200m zlotys ($40m) proceeds compared to the total of around 300m złoty registered during the entire interwar period, though income reported was only around 7% of the proceeds. Given worth of total Polish annual exports in the late 1930s hovered around 1,100m zlotys, arms sales for the Republic constituted some 6% of overall Polish exports for the period of 1936–1938. Some authors speculate that individual Polish decision-makers might have benefitted from the process personally. In case of some smaller arms merchants their intermediary role elevated them to significant players on the market. For the Republic Poland turned either the second or the third largest arms supplier; until today it is not clear what was the size of French exports, though given France was the principal architect of non-intervention policy it is unlikely that its sales exceeded the Polish ones. As overall republican foreign military spendings are estimated at some $0.3-0.5bn and as the Soviets received some 75-80% of this sum, the Poles received some 10-15% of all money spent by the Republic. In terms of overall international military assistance to both warring parties of the Spanish Civil War, Poland (which sold some weapons also to the Nationalists) ranked 4th after the USSR ($300m to $500m), Italy ($430m) and Germany ($240m), ahead of Greece ($25m?), France ($3m?), Mexico ($2m?), Austria, Belgium, Czechoslovakia, Estonia, Paraguay and other countries.

=== Media impact ===
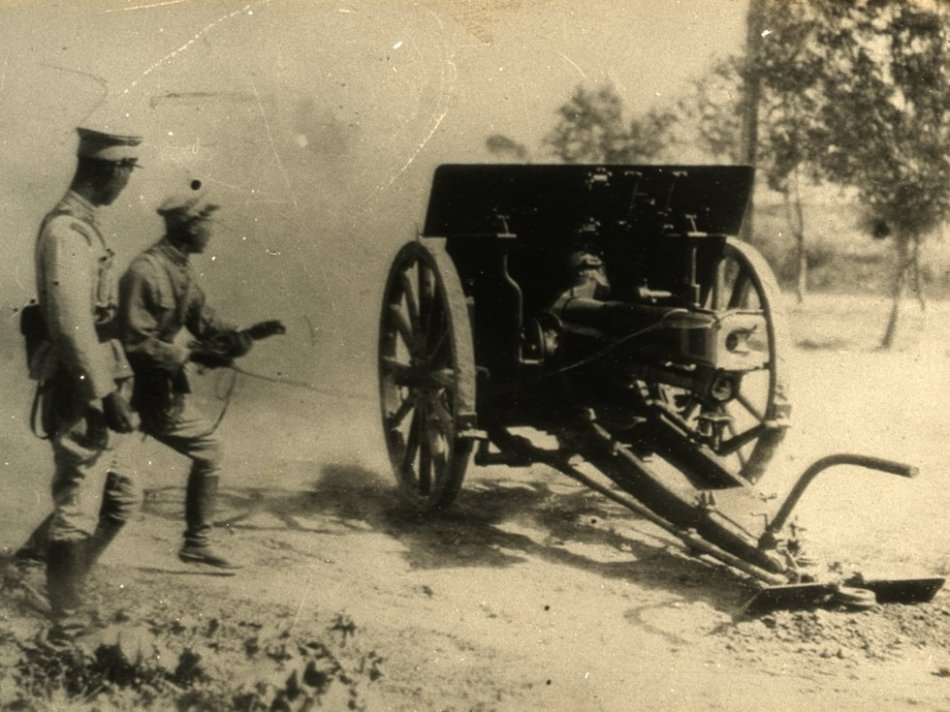
Krupp 75mm artillery in Chinese service

In the Nationalist press notes about Polish sales to the Republicans were rather rare and there was definitely no organized media campaign against Poland. It was so especially that until mid-1937 various press titles followed fate of hundreds of Spaniards who sought shelter in Polish diplomatic missions in Madrid, were evacuated by Polish ships and eventually made it from Poland to the Nationalist zone. However, among the military and even lower administration Polish sales to the Republic were common knowledge; combined with information on Polish International Brigades volunteers they contributed to increasingly negative vision of Poland, which despite its Catholic zeal supported “the red hordes”. In a grand exposition of arms seized from the Republicans, organized in Gran Kursaal in San Sebastián, the Polish section included 18 types of armament.

In the Republican zone information on Polish arms sales was missing, not clear whether resulting from secrecy in order not to endanger breach of non-intervention agreement. However, worth of Soviet aid was often overstated and the USSR was hailed in grandiose propaganda terms as a great friendly country, and even much smaller Mexican military assistance was acknowledged with great fanfare. Various party press titles used to lambast Poland as a fascist dictatorial state. Polish diplomatic mission and its representatives were a few times assaulted, while the Polish honorary consul in Valencia, Vicente Noguera Bonora, was killed by the Republican militia when performing his official tasks. Over time opinions about poor quality of Polish arms became popular, fueling various rumors and hostility towards Poland.

=== Long-term impact ===
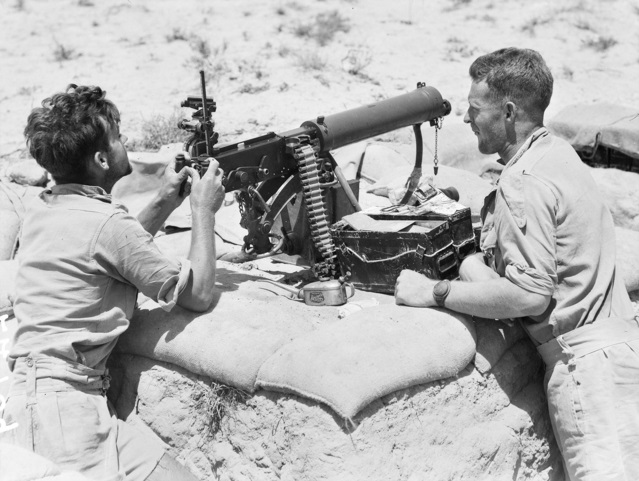
Vickers 7.7 mm HMG in Australian service

There was scarce long-term impact of the Polish sales. Repeated Nationalist protests did not translate into tension between Francoist Spain and Poland, and during 6 months between April and September 1939 mutual relations remained very good if not excellent; despite Nazi pressure, the Polish legation in Madrid was closed fairly late and permitted to operate unofficially, while after World War II, the Franco administration maintained official diplomatic relations with the Polish government-in-exile. The Communist administration in Warsaw periodically exploited propagandawise the Polish contribution to International Brigades fighting “international fascism”, but it maintained blackout on semi-official arms sales of the pre-war government, often also dubbed a “fascist clique”; if mentioned, they were presented as dirty business of few greedy swindlers. In consequence, Polish arms sales went into almost total oblivion; they were treated in few limited-circulation scientific works in the 1980s. After the fall of Soviet rule the subject earned few articles and was extensively treated in two major works, but in general the episode remains unknown to the wide public.

Also in Spain Polish arms sales remain a rather obscure subject. Though it has been treated en passant in some literary works and in some specialized periodicals, with few exceptions most wide-circulation works and historiographic studies on the Spanish Civil War usually ignore, obscure or play down the Polish engagement, though in some cases much smaller supplies from Mexico are noted. The same applies to wide public discourse in present-day Spain. However, in 2021 so far the most voluminous study on the issue has appeared, published by the military historian Lucas Molina Franco; it offers a rather critical revision of prevailing views on Polish arms and challenges opinions on unscrupulous and cynical Polish approach, grounded in works of Howson and Viñas. In international historiography Republican purchases of Polish arms might be ignored, reduced to brief mention, or treated in a separate paragraph.

== Annex. Comparison of Soviet and Polish deliveries ==
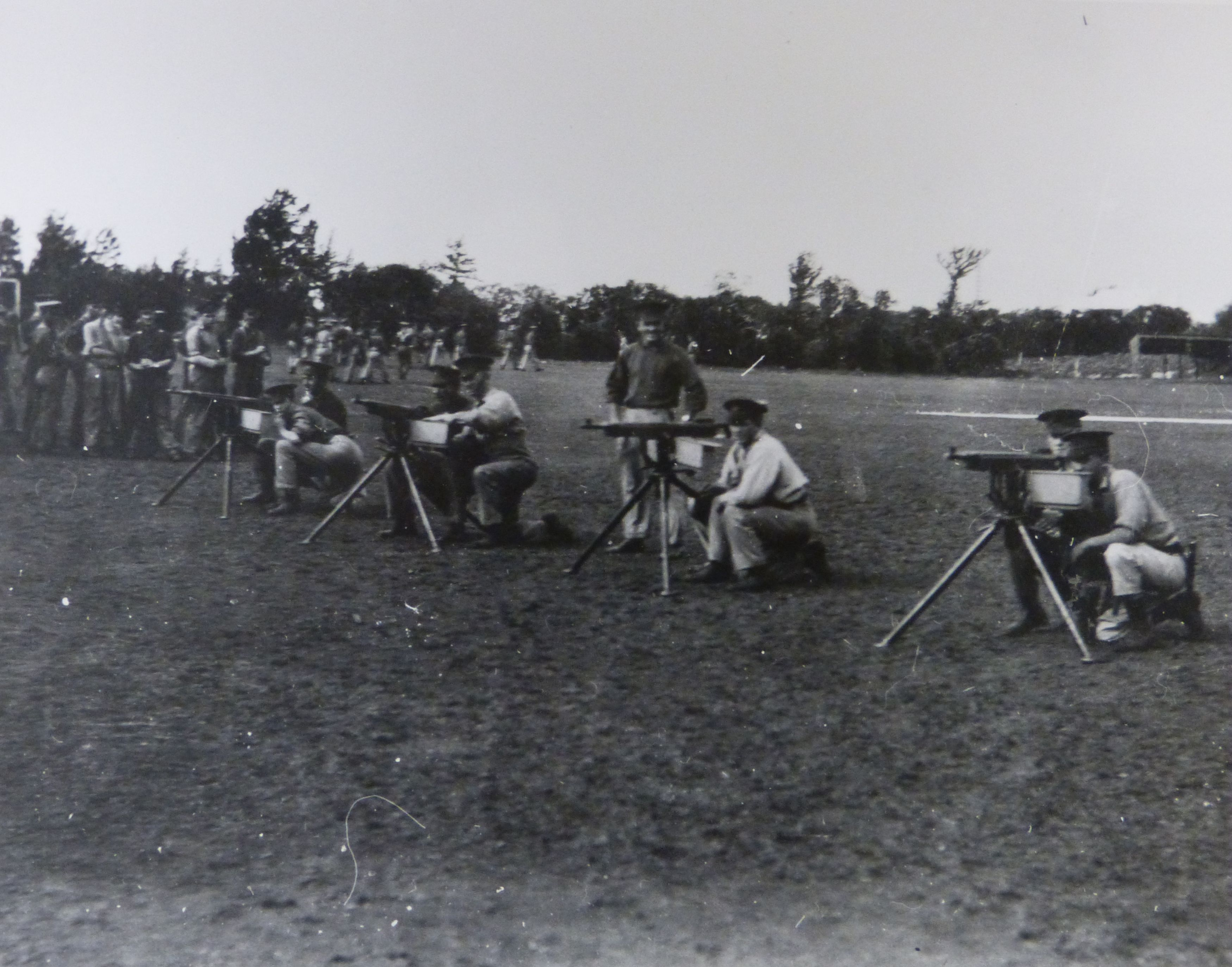
Colt Machine Gun in Canadian service

comparison of Soviet and Polish aid to Republican Spain
category	Soviet deliveries	Polish deliveries	own monthly production
aircraft	630-810	0-40	0
tanks	330-360	16-95	0
other armored vehicles	60-120	0	18
artillery and mortars	1,040-1,900	800	100
machine guns	15,000-20,500	8,700-17,700	?
rifles	415,000-500,000	75,000-200,000	1,000
bombs	110,000	unknown (75 tons)	?
hand grenades	0.5m	1.5-2m	0.7m
artillery rounds	3.4m	0.8m	0.3m
cartridges	862m	180-210m	10m
gunpowder (tons)	1,500	1,800	?
TNT (tons)	unknown	230-950	?
total cost	$250–500m	$24–60m	n/a

Comparison of proportions between Soviet and Polish aid in terms of 1) equipment delivered and 2) total cost for the Republicans reveals a glaring mis-match. Except aircraft and armored cars, in no specific category (assuming highest estimates for Soviet deliveries and lowest estimates for Polish deliveries) Polish supplies amounted to less than 18% of the Soviet ones, in some categories they amounted to some 40%, and in some to 120% or even 300%. However, the Polish aid cost the Republicans at most 10% and at least 5% of the Soviet aid.

The difference in proportion is due to different reasons: 1) Soviet equipment was generally newer and hence more costly; 2) the Soviets overpriced even more than the Poles; 3) while Poles delivered probably no aircraft, all Soviet planes might have cost even $50m. However, with all the above factored in, the cost of Soviet weaponry and equipment would have been in the neighborhood of $300m at most. The actual amount charged by the Soviets and paid by the Republic was between $600m and $800m, yet it included also numerous other items, from petrol to grain; scholars struggle when estimating worth of military aid only.

The difference still unaccounted for resulted from one more factor: the Soviets were billing for every single cost conceivably connected with their involvement in the Spanish Civil War. It consisted of salaries and expenses of personnel sent to Spain (and their dependents, including vacations back in the USSR, and including personnel who never left the USSR, like intelligence people), transportation (charged extra and from the very first step in the Soviet Union), construction of military facilities (in Spain and in the USSR), and training of Spanish military (mostly pilots and tank crewmen) in the USSR. These categories are at times ignored, especially that the Republican media usually gave the impression that the Soviet assistance was provided free of charge.

== See also ==
- International response to the Spanish Civil War
- Non-intervention in the Spanish Civil War
- SEPEWE
- Spanish Civil War
