= SEPEWE =

SEPEWE was a Polish arms industry syndicate. Established as a joint venture of the Polish government and 19 private companies of the arms industry, it became one of the largest arms dealerships of the 1920s and 1930s. Between 1926 and 1939 SEPEWE exported Polish and foreign-made military equipment to over 30 states, with revenues of 320 to 350 million zlotys.

The company specialised in both surplus military equipment of World War I vintage and modern weapons produced by Polish factories. Equipment sold ranged from small arms to modern PZL.37 medium bombers.

== Name ==
The full name of the syndicate was "Eksport Przemysłu Obronnego SEPEWE sp. z o.o." - "Export of Arms Industry SEPEWE, Co. Ltd.". The SEPEWE name itself was initially an abbreviation meaning "Arms Industry Export Syndicate" (Polish: Syndykat Eksportu Przemysłu Wojennego), but the full name was rarely used.

== History ==
Although after World War I and the Polish-Bolshevist War Poland inherited a sizeable arms industry, the Polish Army also had large stocks of military equipment. As domestic orders for new weaponry dwindled, Polish arms industry tried to find new clients abroad, mostly in Romania, Yugoslavia and Turkey. Simultaneously, the Polish Army also tried to sell surplus war materiel to those states, both as a means of obtaining funds for further modernisation of the armed forces, and as a means of strengthening Poland's political influence in Central Europe. Initially the private companies tried to compete on their own while the government's efforts were directed by head of Army Administration Office, Gen. Mieczysław Norwid-Neugebauer. The private companies tried to join forces by forming a Section of Military Industry (Polish: Sekcja Przemysłu Wojennego, SPW) lobbying group as part of the Metal Industry Exporters Union, but European markets of early 1920s were filled with surplus rifles, bullets and artillery pieces and the sales drive brought little effects.

The situation changed dramatically after the May Coup d'État of 1926. Already in late May Norwid-Neugebauer met with the industry's representatives to establish possible ways for the Army and the arms producers to cooperate. The new government of Kazimierz Bartel promised to lower the export tariffs, and Polish State Railways tariffs for arms transports, take over the promotion of Polish arms industry and provide the companies with cheap, state-sponsored credits.

Finally on 5 November 1926 the Ministry of Military Affairs signed an agreement with 19 mostly privately held arms industry companies to establish the SEPEWE company. Although initially the company's shareholders were mostly privately held companies, the Sanacja focused on nationalisation of strategically important branches of the economy and already in 1928 most shares of the SEPEWE were in government hands, either directly or indirectly. In 1934 the company received a de facto monopoly for arms exports and in 1937 it was converted to a joint stock company, with most shares in direct government control.

== Clients ==
At one point or another SEPEWE had representatives in 70 states, with roughly half eventually buying Polish arms. The income of the company made Poland one of the largest arms exporters of the era, though many arms deliveries were paid for with raw materials and other supplies rather than money. The largest clients were:

- Spanish Republic - 180 million złoty
- Greece - 20 million
- Romania - 18,5 million
- Bulgaria - 16 million
- Turkey - 8 million
- Yugoslavia - ca. 7.9 million
- China - 7 million
- United Kingdom - 5 million
- Kingdom of Hejaz - ca. 3.62 million
- Netherlands - 2.5 million
- Estonia - ca. 2.1 million
- Brazil - ca. 1.62 million
- France - ca. 1.5 million
- Palestine - 1.5 million
- Hungary - ca. 1.5 million

== Equipment sold ==
Although Poland was one of the first signatories of the arms embargo on Spain, the Spanish Republic was one of the largest clients of SEPEWE during the Spanish Civil War. Spain bought, among other types of weaponry:

- over 1700 Ckm wz. 30 machine guns
- 3000 pieces of M1895 Mosin–Nagant rifles (in January 1937, transported aboard SS Cieszyn)
- 25,100 pieces of Polish-made Karabin wz. 98 Mauser and Karabin wz. 98a rifles (between September 1936 and September 1937)
- 2000 pieces of Karabinek wz. 29 carbine
- 2000 to 2600 pieces of ex-German Gewehr 98 rifles from the Erfurt Arsenal (in February 1937)
- 37,400 pieces of ex-French Berthier rifles of various types (in three batches in March and April 1937)
- 10,000 pieces of ex-French Lebel rifles (in December 1936)
- 26,000 pieces of ex-British Lee–Enfield rifles (in October 1936)
- 27,000 pieces of ex-Austro-Hungarian Mannlicher M1895 rifles (in four batches between October 1936 and April 1937)
- 167 MP18 Submachineguns (October 1936)
- 1,481 Bergmann MG15 machineguns (October 1936, the shipment was captured by nationalists)
- 400 .303 Lewis machineguns (March 1937)
- 233 ex-Paraguayan Vickers–Berthier Machineguns (September 1937)

The Polish Army also sold to Spain an unspecified number of other rare types of rifles and carbines, among them Fusil Gras mle 1874, Kropatschek rifles and Vetterli rifles. In addition to service weapons, the SEPEWE syndicate also sold to Spain at least 7 Krupp 7.5 cm Model 1906 mountain guns and at least four 75mm Schneider guns of various types.

The SEPEWE also supplied arms to the other side of the war, the Francoist Spain. While Spanish Republic wanted to buy the PZL P.11e fighter in 1935, Polish government feared that the design might leak to the Soviet Union and the deal was denied. Eventually in 1937 over sixty Polish planes were sold to the Nationalists through Portugal. Among them were 20 pieces of PWS-10, 20 Breguet XIX, 20 PWS-16, 4 RWD-13 and 1 RWD-8.
