= Ciężki karabin maszynowy wz. 30 =

ckm wz. 30
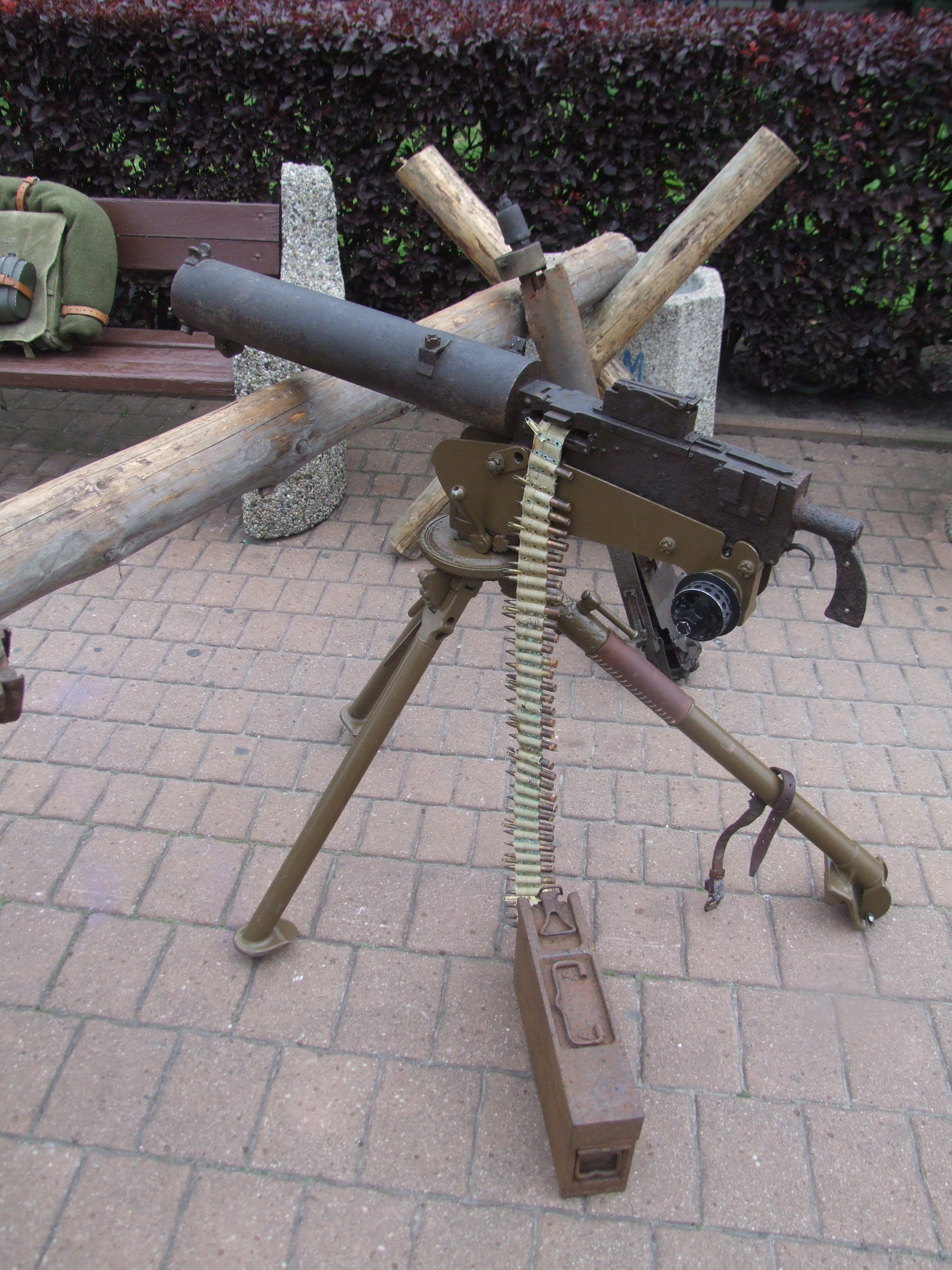
- heavy machine gun wz. 30 on tripod wz. 30
- Type: Heavy machine gun
- Place of origin: Second Polish Republic

Service history
- In service: 1931–1970
- Used by: See Users
- Wars: Spanish Civil War; World War II

Production history
- Designed: 1930
- Manufacturer: Państwowa Fabryka Karabinów
- Produced: 1931–1939
- No. built: 10,388+
- Variants: wz.1930a wz.1930/39T (cal. 7.65×53mm, prototype for Turkish army) wz.33, wz.36 (aircraft guns)

Specifications
- Mass: 65 kg (143 lb) (gun, tripod, water, and ammunition); 13.6 kg (30 lb) (gun without water)
- Length: 1,200 mm (47 in)
- Barrel length: 720 mm (28 in)
- Cartridge: 7.92×57mm
- Caliber: 7.92 mm
- Action: recoil
- Rate of fire: 600 round/min
- Muzzle velocity: 845 m/s (2,770 ft/s)
- Feed system: 330-round belt

The ckm wz. 30 (short for ciężki karabin maszynowy wzór 30; "heavy machine gun pattern 1930") is a Polish derivative of the American Browning M1917 heavy machine gun. Produced with various modifications such as greater caliber, longer barrel and adjustable sighting device, it was an improved although unlicensed copy of its predecessor, and was the standard machine gun of the Polish Army from 1931.

== Design and development ==
After Poland regained her independence in 1918, her armed forces were armed with a variety of different weapons, mostly a legacy of the armies of her former occupying powers. As with its rifles and carbines, the machine guns used by the Polish Army in the Polish–Soviet War included the Russian 7.62 mm M1910 Maxim, the Austrian 1907 8 mm Schwarzlose MG M.07/12, the German 7.92 mm Maschinengewehr 08, and the French 8 mm Hotchkiss Mle 1914. Such diversity was a logistical nightmare, and in the early 1920s the General Staff of the Polish Army decided to replace all older machine guns with a new design, specifically built to Polish designations.

Initially the Hotchkiss machine gun, proven during the Polish–Soviet War and adapted to the standard Polish 7.92 mm round (as the ckm wz. 25), had the most supporters. In late 1924 and early 1925, 1,250 were ordered from France and the Polish Ministry of War started talks on buying the license for manufacturing copies in Poland. However, the first tests of the post-war Hotchkiss machine guns proved that the new production were well below both Polish needs and maker's specifications, and the talks came to a halt. By the end of 1927, the ministry organized a contest for a new standard all-purpose heavy machine gun.

Four companies took part in the competition: the American Colt company with the M1928 (modified export variant of the Browning M1917A1), a Czechoslovak-built rechambered version of Schwarzlose M.7/12 (Schwarzlose-Janeček vz.7/24), the British Vickers machine gun converted to 7.92mm caliber, and Hotchkiss with improved wz. 25 model. All initial tests were won by Browning. The tests were repeated in 1928, and again the American weapon won, so the Polish ministry decided to purchase a license. The price, however, was very high ($450,000), and Colt demanded an order for 3,000 guns in its own factories. It turned out that neither the Colt company nor its European representative, the Vickers-Armstrong, had patented the design in Poland. In addition, the documentation of a recently purchased license for Browning Automatic Rifle (via Colt's agent, Belgian company Fabrique Nationale de Herstal) was faulty, and deliveries were delayed, which discouraged the Polish from further orders abroad. Because of that, the Polish ministry decided to order the preparation of a local version of the Browning M1917 at Fabryka Karabinów in Warsaw.

== Modifications ==
In mid-1930 the first test models were ready and were sent to various testing ranges. In March 1931 the first 200 models were sent to front-line units for further tests under the designation of ckm wz. 30. Serial production started by the end of that year. Among the most notable differences between the original and the Polish clone were:

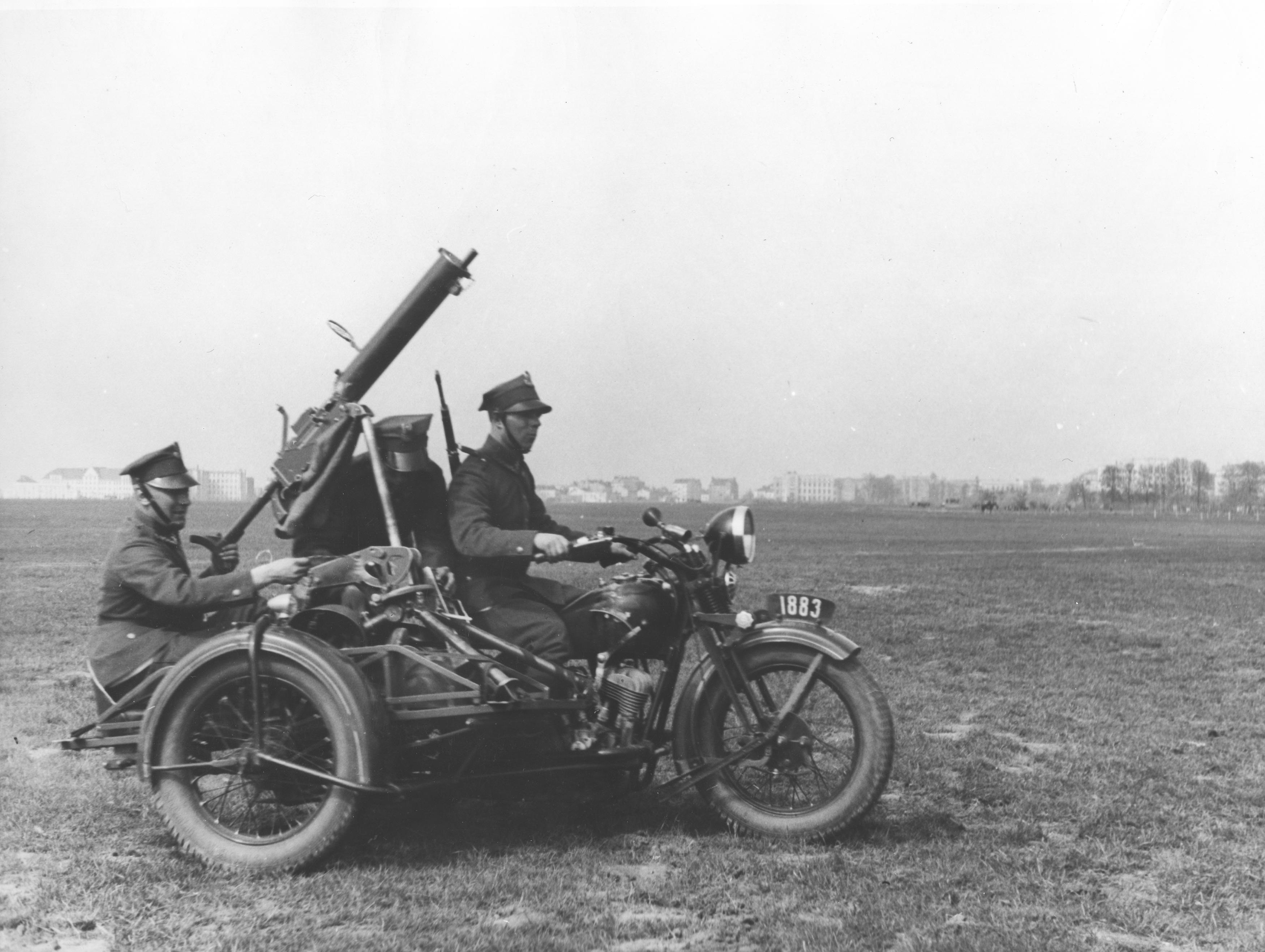
Ckm wz. 30 mounted on a Polish Army motorcycle Sokół 1000 with the handle and sights adapted for anti-aircraft fire, photo from before 1 September 1939

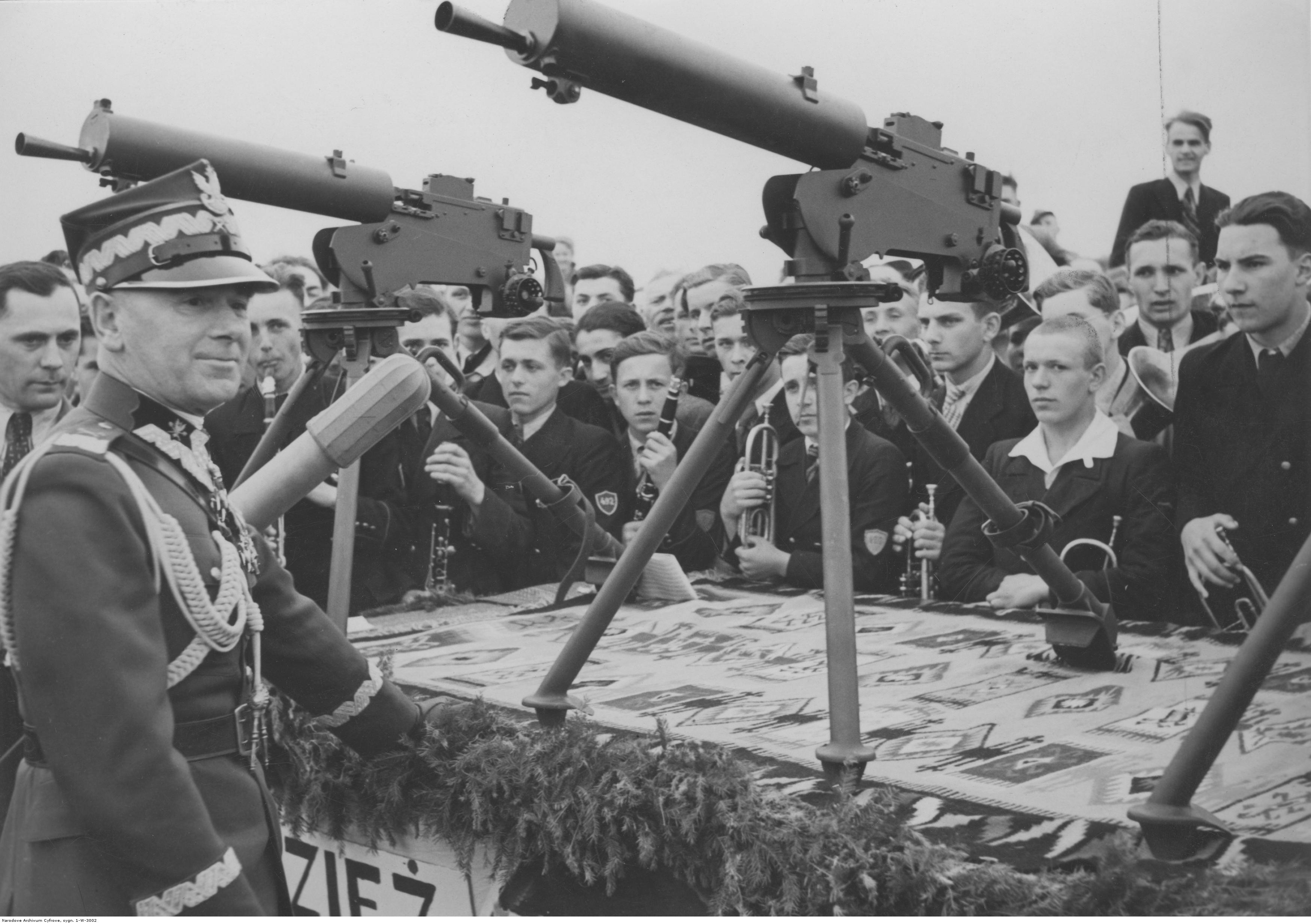
Ckm wz. 30 MGs on wz. 34 tripods presented by the youth to Marshal Rydz-Śmigły, 1939

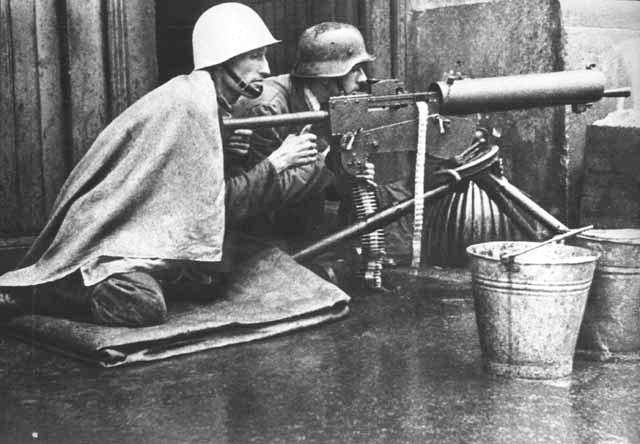
During the Warsaw Uprising, 1944

1. Different calibre, adapted to the Polish standard 7.92×57mm Mauser ammunition
2. Loophole iron sights replaced with V-notch sights
3. Butt handle of the weapon was lengthened for easier carriage
4. Longer barrel for greater precision and accuracy
5. Rifle lock was modified for easier exchange of used-up barrels
6. The lock was modified for easier handling
7. New mounting was adapted, with a mast for anti-aircraft fire
8. Sights were adapted for anti-aircraft fire as well as a handle for aiming in the air was added
9. Added flame suppressor

Three types of a tripod mounting were developed and used in Poland. First was wz. 30 mounting for infantry (weight 29.3 kg), superseded with improved wz. 34 mounting (26.3 kg). Cavalry adopted more modern wz. 36 mounting instead (17 kg). All tripods could be used for anti-aircraft fire, using a mast, transported in a rear leg in case of infantry mountings, or folded below the barrel and fulfilling also a role of a recoil shock absorber, in case of the cavalry mounting.

Following the first tests, a series of additional modifications was introduced. In 1938 the trigger mechanism was replaced with a completely new, more reliable system. In addition, the lock was replaced for easier handling and keeping the weapon in good condition. The modified design received the designation of ckm wz. 30a, though the name was rarely used by the soldiers themselves. The new version was also the basis of a ckm wz. 30/39T design, designed for export to Turkey and adapted to Turkish standard 7.65×53mm Argentine ammunition. However, the design was never introduced in large numbers as the Turkish competition was halted after World War II broke out. In the late 30s, Wilniewczyc and Skrzypinski designed experimental barrels with a rifled oval barrel bore ("Lancaster rifling"). The barrels were very expensive to produce, but gave a significant increase of the accuracy and longevity of the barrel. Altogether, between 1931 and 1939, the Fabryka Karabinow ("Rifle Factory") in Warsaw built at least 8,401 ckm wz. 30 for the Polish Army, in addition to 200 of information series (available are only data until March 1939, and several hundreds more were probably built by September 1939). In addition, quite a big number - over 1,700 - was exported by the SEPEWE syndicate to Republican Spain. There were trials to sell them also to other countries, like Romania, Bulgaria, Estonia, Yugoslavia and Argentina, but in spite of favourable participation in contests, the state factory had no resources to credit deliveries. Among others, in 1936 in Argentina the wz. 30 machine gun was evaluated as more reliable and accurate than original Browning M1928, but Colt could ensure more favourable conditions of delivery. In 1938 Turkey ordered 500 wz. 30/39T machine guns and probably at least part of this contract was fulfilled. Captured weapons were used by Nationalist Spain, Nazi Germany and Romania. After 1939, many preserved wz. 30 machine guns were used by Polish partisan units (mainly Home Army), among others during Warsaw Uprising.

== Surviving examples ==
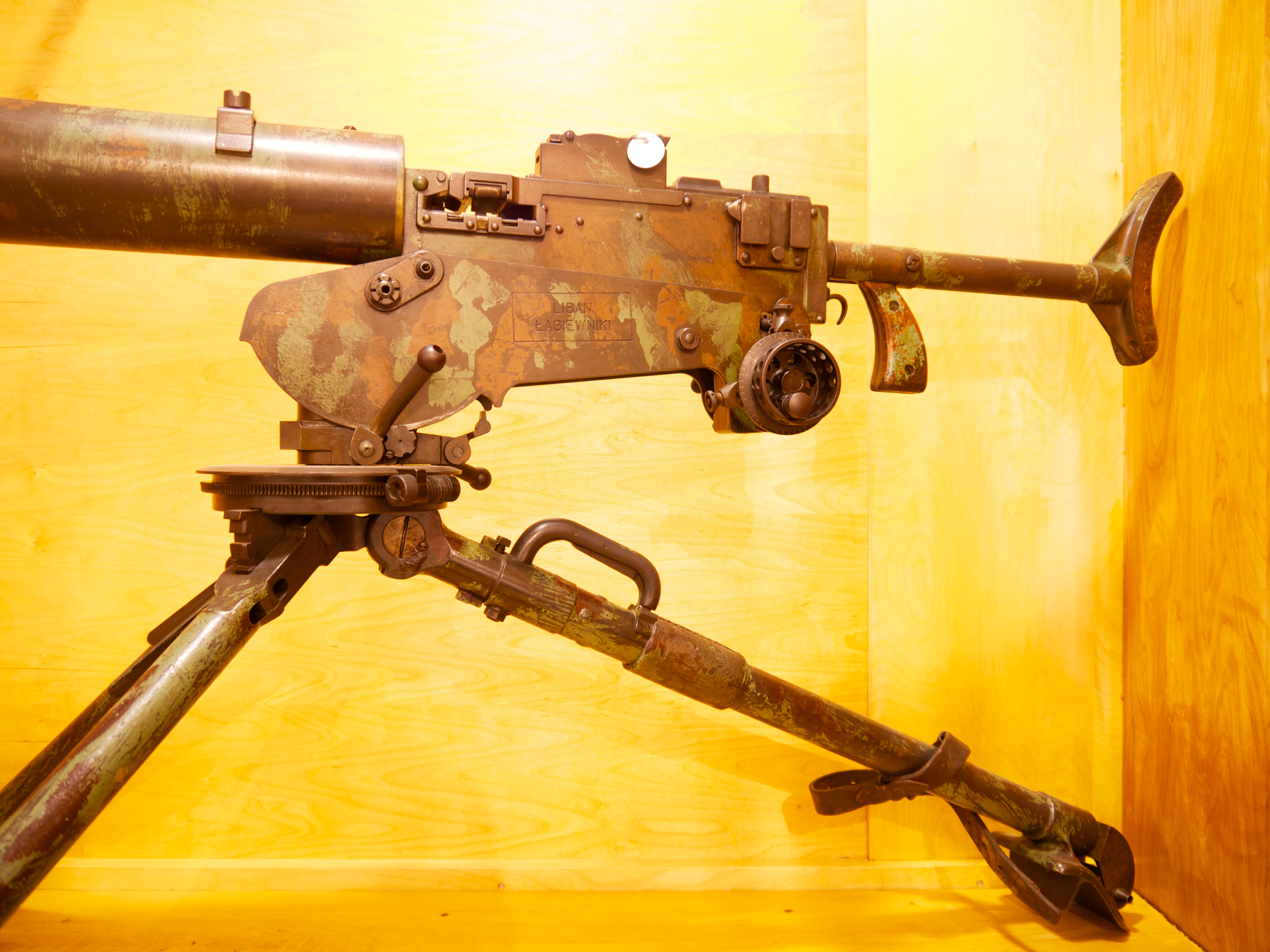
Ckm wz. 30 on wz. 34 tripod at Base Borden Military Museum

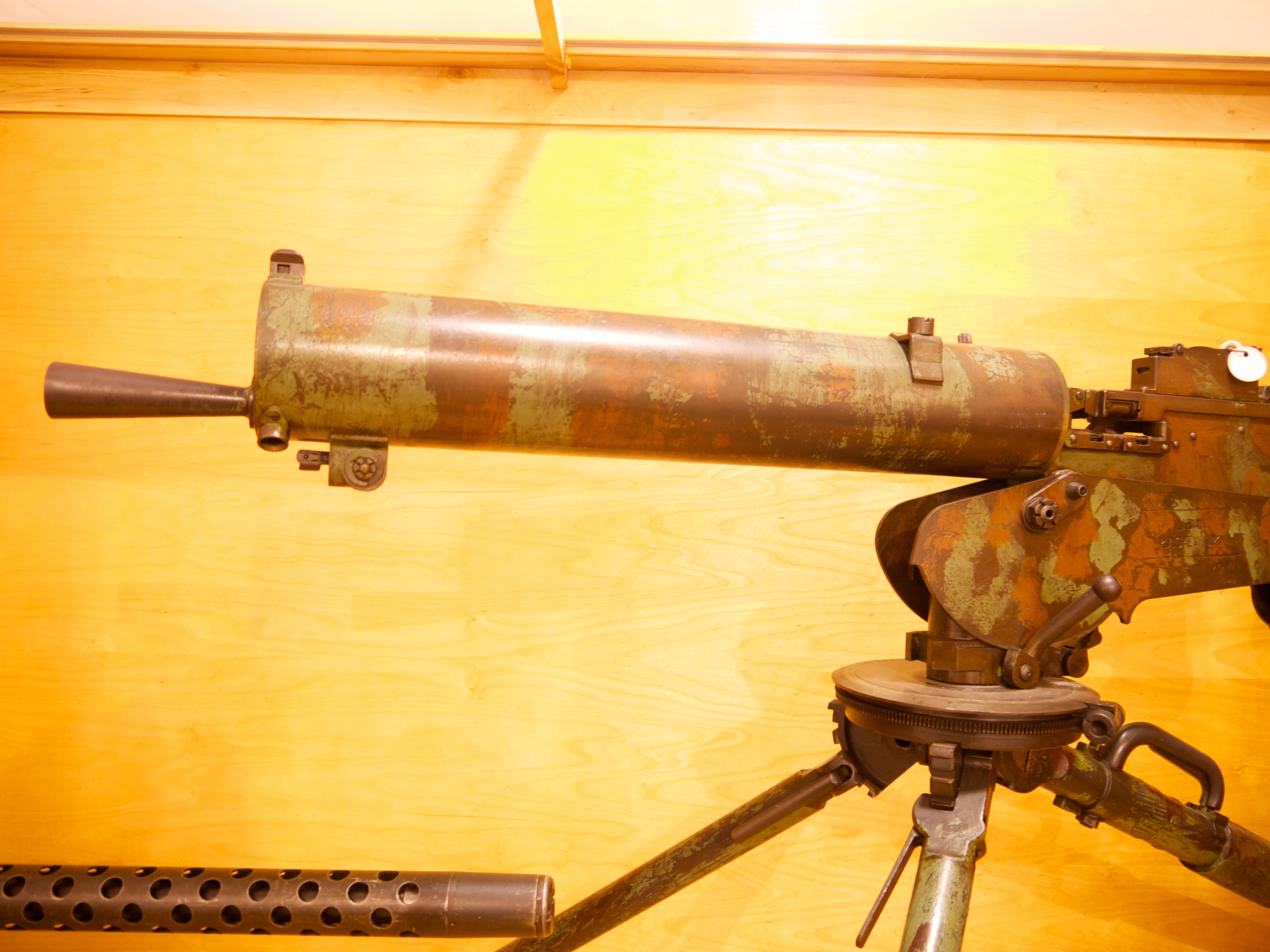

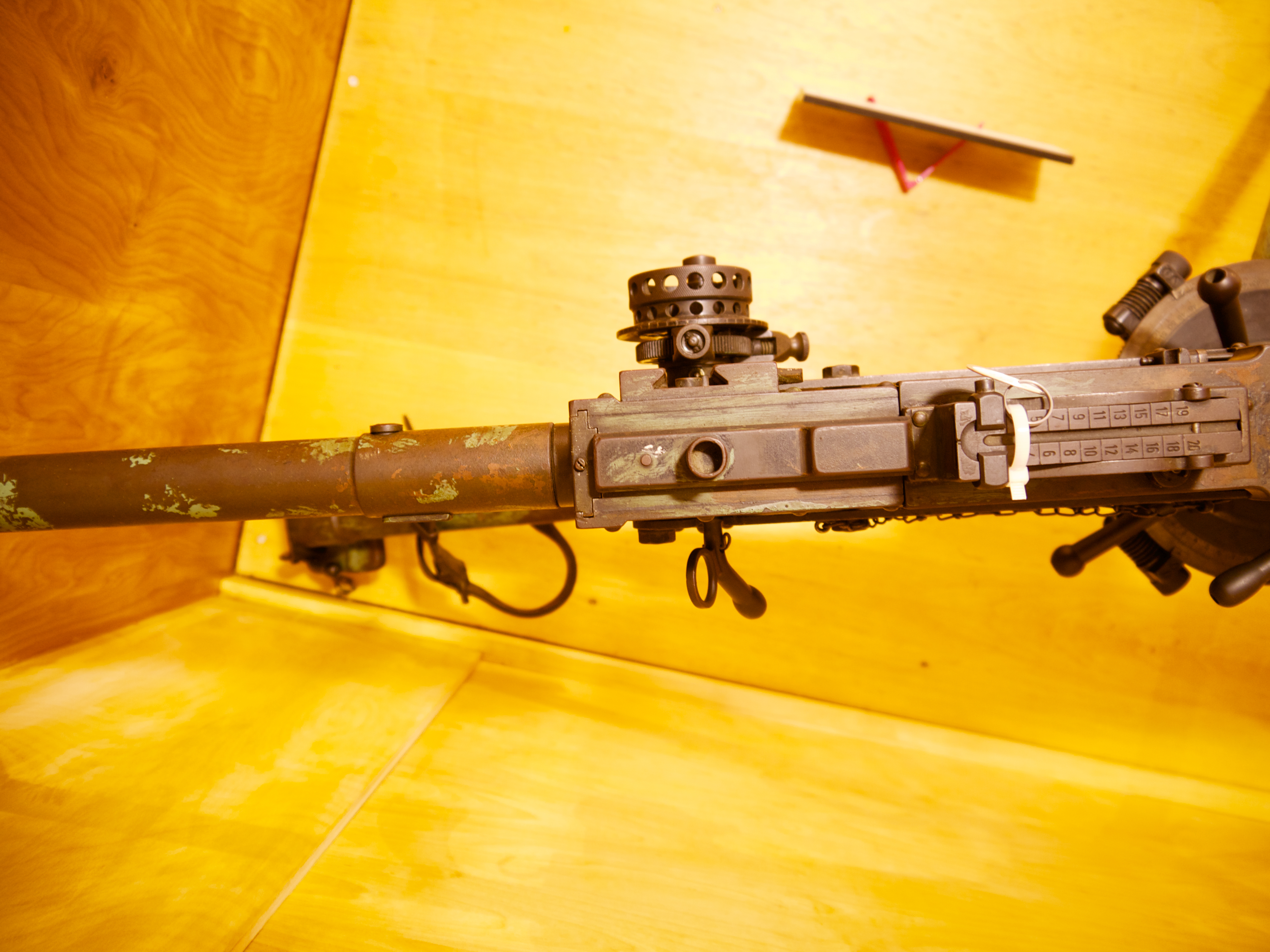

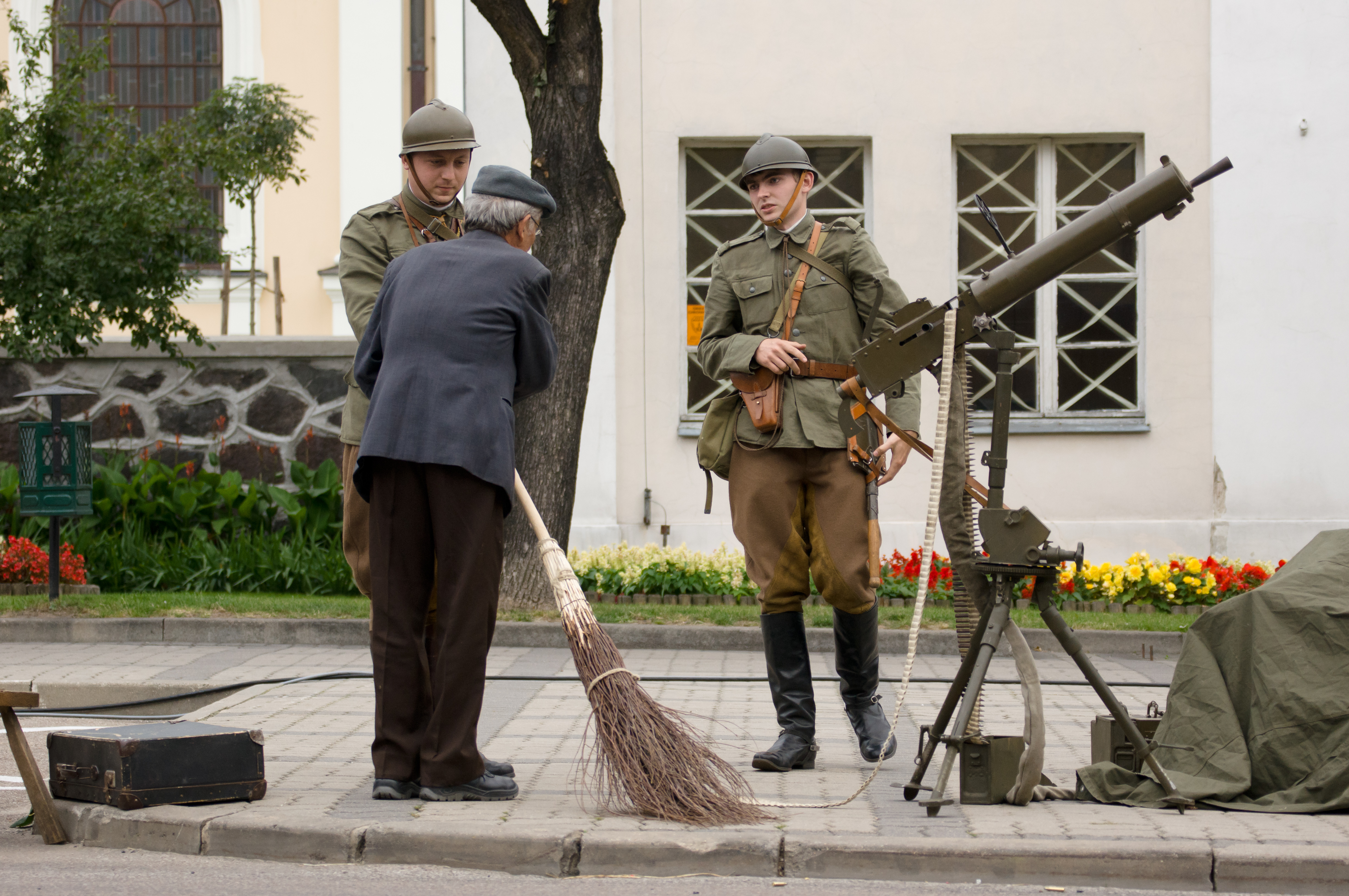
Polish reenactors with ckm wz. 30 on wz. 36 tripod in AA position

== Users ==
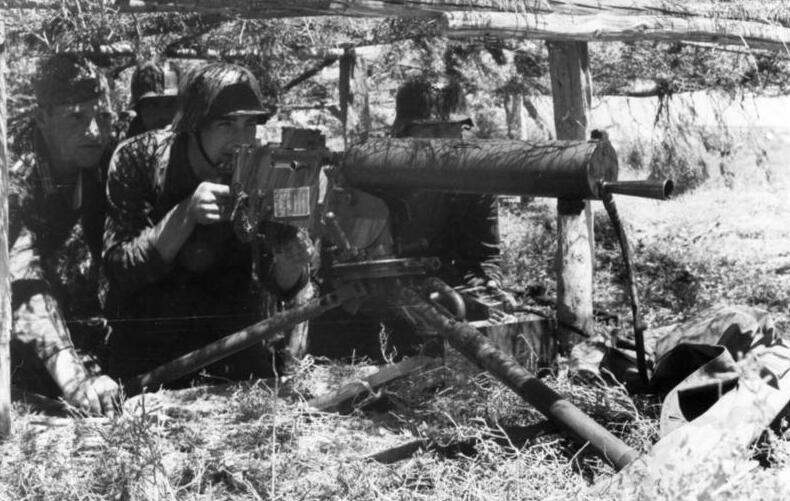
Captured ckm wz. 30 on wz. 34 tripod on German defensive positions in coastal France, 1943

- (Poland) Second Polish Republic
- Kingdom of Romania
- (Spain) Second Spanish Republic
- Nationalist Spain
- Turkey
- Nazi Germany: Captured examples were used by the Wehrmacht after Poland fell in 1939. Famously Franz Gockel used this weapon manning a position at WN62 at Easy Red Sector of Omaha Beach on D-Day.
- Republic of China: Supplied in small quantities by the Soviet Union in 1940
