= Vicente Noguera Bonora =

Spanish entrepreneur (1891–1936)

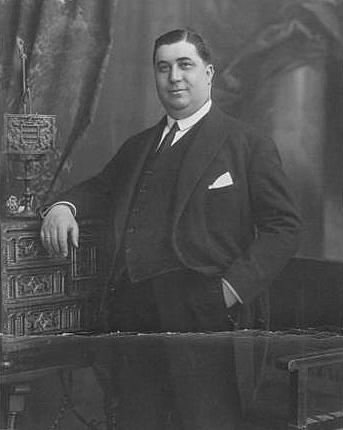
- Born: Vicente Noguera Bonora; 1891; Valencia, Spain
- Died: 1936 (aged 44–45); Grau, Spain
- Occupation: entrepreneur
- Known for: businessman

Vicente Noguera Bonora (1891–1936) was a Spanish entrepreneur. He is known as member of the economic elite in Valencia of the late 1920s and the early 1930s. Though he held stakes in companies from chemical, food, and electricity sectors, his business focus was on finance and urbanism; he co-managed numerous banks and construction firms. By scholars he is considered an "emblematic representative of the new Valencian bourgeoisie". Since 1934 he served as an honorary consul of Poland. He was killed by UGT militiamen when performing his consular duties; he tried to provide humanitarian assistance to refugees fleeing Republican terror.

== Ascendants ==
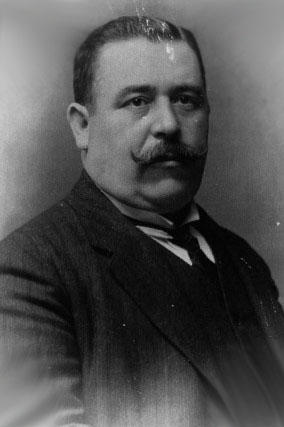
father

The Nogueras was a well-known Valencian bourgeoisie family of entrepreneurs. The family business was started in the 1830s by Antonio José Noguera Belloch de Ferrer (born 1817), who set up a seed oil factory. It was inherited by his son, Antonio Noguera Fusimaña (born 1842), and turned into the Noguera Hermanos y Cía. The company was taken over by Antonio's sons, though it was managed mostly by the oldest sibling, José Antonio Noguera Pla (born 1865), who eventually became the sole owner. He diversified the business by importing natural fertilizers (e.g. from Chile) and producing chemical ones, apart from other commodities, e.g. soap; the company transformed into José Antonio Noguera S.A. Fábrica de Productos Químicos. He engaged also in construction and insurance industry, becoming one of Valencian business and financial tycoons. José Antonio married Guadalupe Bonora Llorens, descendant to another Valencian bourgeoisie family. The couple had 4 children: José Antonio, Vicente, Guadalupe and Antonio Noguera Bonora; following death of Guadalupe the widower remarried with Maria Irene Aparicio Aparicio, and in this union had 2 more children: Irene and Juan Noguera Aparicio. It was José Antonio Noguera Bonora who emerged as leader of the family business conglomerate, which in the 1920s included also a ceramics factory producing earthenware and tableware, paving stones, and refractory materials for metalworking and cement production.

== Descendants ==
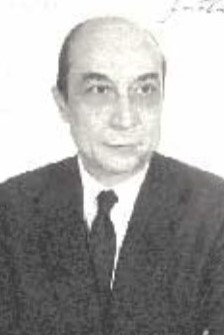
son José Antonio

As a teenager Bonora frequented Colegio-Academia de San Fernando in Valencia, yet it is not clear whether and if yes what university path he followed. At unspecified time, though prior to 1916, he married María de la Concepción Roig Ibáñez; the couple had three children, all of them sons, born between 1916 and 1929: Vicente, José Antonio, and Francisco Noguera Roig. The best known of them, José Antonio, excelled in business; between the late 1960s and early 1980s he presided over various commercial institutions, above all Cámara de Comercio, Industria y Navegación de Valencia. In 1977 he was elected as the Unión de Centro Democrático candidate to the senate, but in the 1979 elections he decided not to stand and withdrew from politics. Until 2003 he served as Síndico de Cuentas de la Generalidad Valenciana. His older brother Vicente served as president of Valencia Club de Fútbol during early Francoism; in the early 1950s he was also concejal in the Valencia city council. The youngest brother Francisco entered the judiciary and all his life served as a magistrate in the Balearic Islands, entering also Academia de Jurisprudencia y Legislación de las Islas Baleares. Noguera's descendants and nephews formed and form part of the Valencian business elite; the best known of their enterprises is the Libertad 7 conglomerate, and the best known personality was Álvaro Noguera Giménez.

== Businessman: finance ==
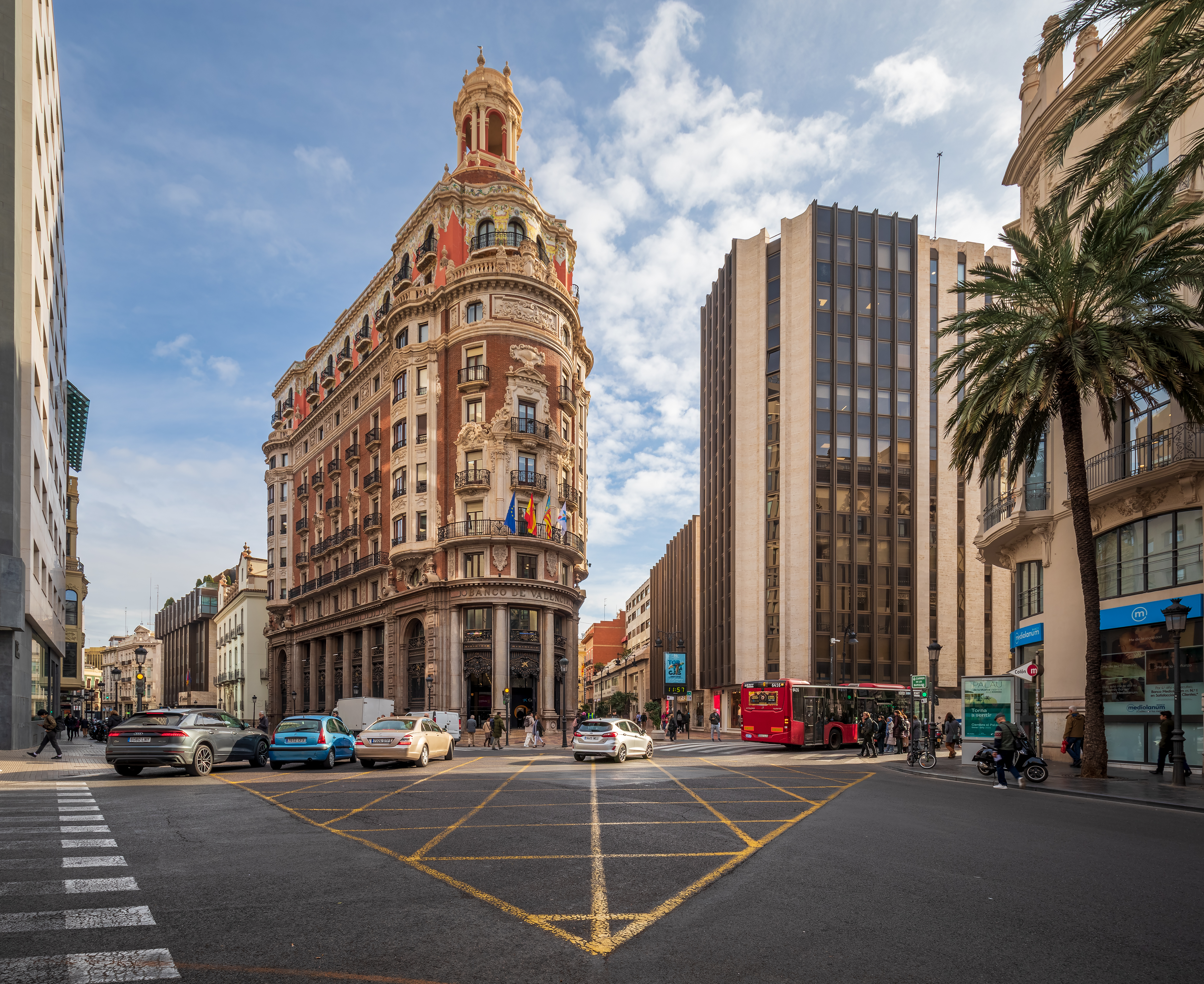
Banco de Valencia (current view)

Initially Noguera was engaged at various roles in the chemical family enterprise managed by his father, later acting as Consejero Delegado of the company, José Antonio Noguera S.A. However, what defined his role in the Valencian business elite was engagement in the finance sector. He was among of a group of entrepreneurs who re-established the ailing Banco de Valencia. Since the mid-1920s he remained one of its key managers, along members of the Villalonga Villalba and Casanova families; periodically he held the rotating presidency of the board of directors. It was Noguera who directed the bank towards engagement in Valencian agriculture, either by means of credit or co-ownership. In 1932 Banco de Valencia purchased shares of another bank, Banco Internacional de la Industria y Comercio, which ensured Noguera's seat in its Consejo de administración and later its presidency. He entered also the board of other financial institutions, be it from the banking sector (Banco de Castellón, Banco Hispano Colonial, Banco Exterior de España, Banco Vitalicio) or insurance (Mutua Valenciada de Seguros, La Mutua Valenciana de Accidentes de Trabajo, Unión Levantina de Seguros).

== Businessman: other sectors ==
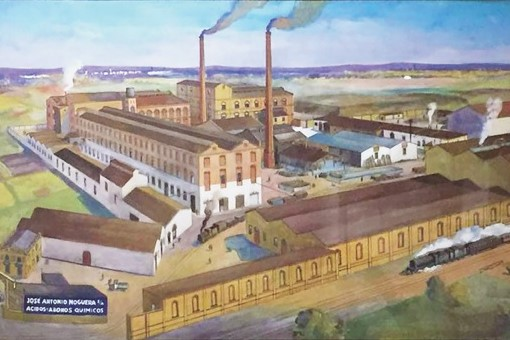
Noguera chemical plant, Valencia

Noguera entered executive boards or got otherwise engaged in companies from numerous other business sectors, especially these which were co-owned or remained related to financial institutions he co-managed; he acted as their representative, though in some cases also as a private shareholder or representative of the Noguera family conglomerates. Traditionally, some formed part of the chemicals sector and specialized in fertilizers: Derivados de los Agrios Industriales S.A., Applicaciones Químico Industriales, S.A., Fosforera Canariense, and Compañia Arrendataria de Fósforos. Some were related to food industry, namely Azucarera de Sevilla (sugar) and Romani y Miguel S.A. (citrus fruits). However, he was gradually focusing on urban development. He purchased at least 7 very large plots in suburban areas marked in municipal planning as future "ensanches" and co-managed construction companies, Compañía Madrileña de Mejoras Urbanas and Compañía de Mejoras Urbanas de Valencia. Within this urban development framework he engaged also in the utilities sector, be it water (Sociedad Española de Abastecimientos) or electricity (Luz y Fuerza de Levante). Apart from the Valencian Levantine coast, he was commercially active also in Madrid, Andalusia, Catalonia and the Canary Islands.

== Businessman: overview ==
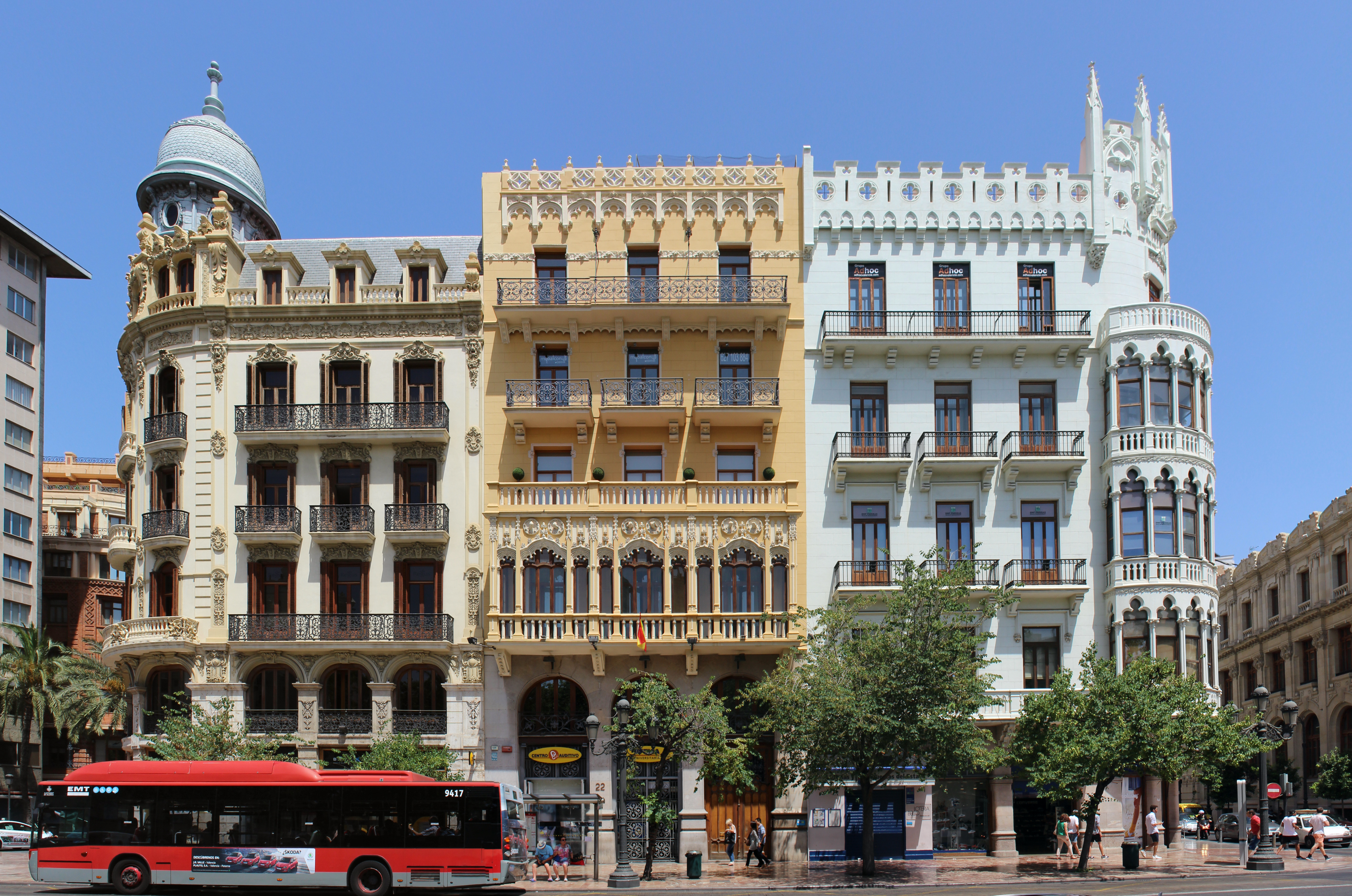
Casa Noguera, Valencia

Noguera was member of numerous organizations grouping business moguls, e.g. various local chambers of commerce. However, the key one was Federación Industrial, Mercantil y Agrícola, at the time the premier association of employers in Valencia and the entire Levantine region; in 1931 he was nominated its president. Because of his diversified entrepreneurial activity, and in particular because of his role in infrastructural (finance, urbanism) and cross-business (chemicals and agriculture, construction and utilities) environment, a present-day scholar considers him "un représentant emblématique de cette nouvelle bourgeoisie valencienne", which not merely developed their own businesses, but strove also to shape the general economic framework they were operating in. Another scholar counts him among entrepreneurs who took "a leading role" in urban development, and thrived partially thanks to their influence in the ayuntamiento and preferential treatment received. On the list of the biggest property owners in Valencia of the early 1930s Noguera ranked at No. 7, with net annual income of 74,754 pesetas. The position of the Nogueras was demonstrated by the splendid family residence at the Castelar Plaza.

== Politics ==
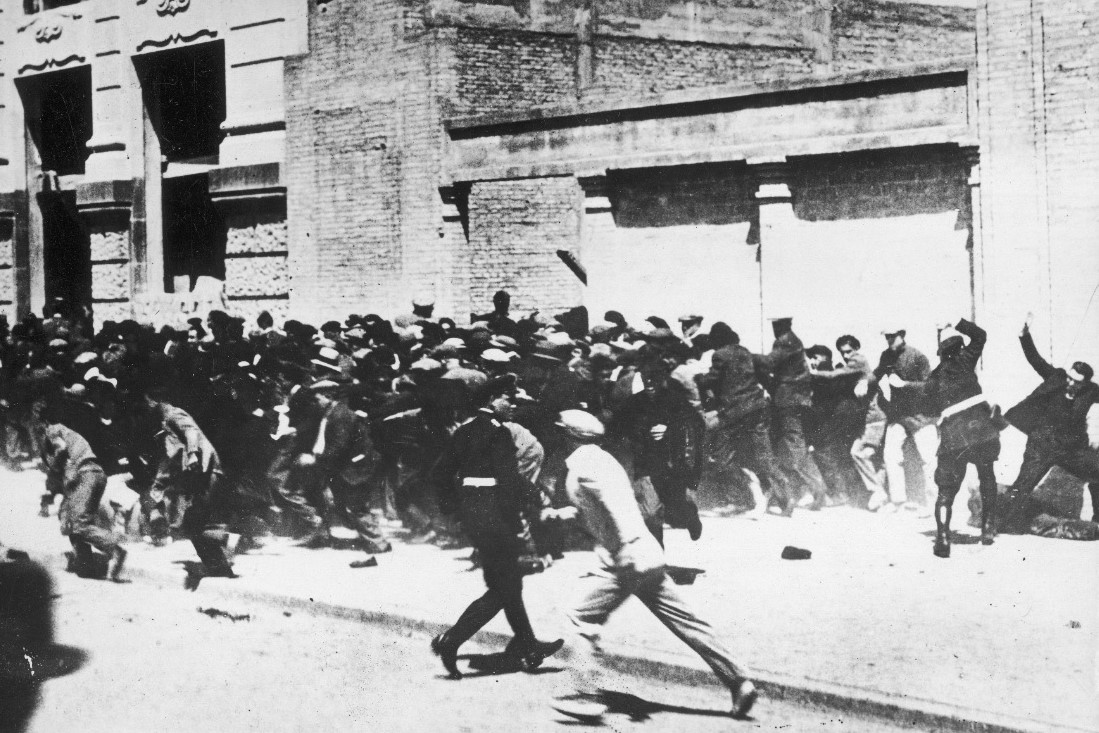
riots in Valencia, 1932

There is no information available on political preferences of Noguera's ancestors and none of his ascendants has been noted in the press as related to politics. In a scholarly work the Nogueras are treated in a section titled La bourgeoisie industrielle la grande fabricante de nationalismes, yet there is no confirmation that any representative of the family engaged in a party flavoured with nationalism, be it Spanish, Catalan or Valencian one. It is known that as a teenager Noguera frequented a Catholic college in Valencia, but he was baptized (together with his sister) not as a newborn baby but fairly late, at the age of 16. Some of his siblings approached Partido de Unión Republicana Autonomista, the left-leaning organisation of republican Valencian autonomists, yet it remains unknown whether Vicente Noguera engaged in PURA himself. One historian speculates that as co-owner of numerous large industrial enterprises he remained in conflict with various workers' organizations, in particular with the socialist trade union UGT. Another scholar refers to "wealthy industrialist Vicente Noguera, a hate figure on the Valencian left", yet he provides no further details. One more academic notes "fiebre reorganizativa patronal de los primeros años treinta [in Valencia]. En esta refundación influyó, sin duda, el impulso personal de algunas personalidades empresariales, singularmente Vicente Noguera Bonora".

== Death ==
former PSOE logotype

Since August 1934, Noguera served as an honorary consul of Poland in Valencia, the appointment related to orange exports. Things changed following outbreak of the civil war. There were some 300-400 Spaniards seeking shelter from Republican terror and accommodated in Polish diplomatic premises; the Polish legacy kept corresponding with the Ministry of Foreign Affairs about their would-be evacuation. In early August 1936 Noguera was instructed by the Polish charge d'affaires in Madrid, Leopold Koziebrodzki, to travel to Marseilles and arrange would-be accommodation of the refugees. However, Noguera struggled to obtain a lassez-passer to go abroad; he was issued appropriate documents, though only after having paid a kickback of 1m pesetas, disguised as donation to an anti-fascist committee. He decided to take his family with him. On August 19 together with wife and children and accompanied by the German honorary consul Max Buch, Noguera travelled to Grau, where he was supposed to board a German merchant ship. However, local militiamen refused to let him pass. A present-day historian hypothesizes that they notified PSOE members in Valencia, possibly former employees in one of Noguera's companies; Noguera's son, when later interrogated by Causa General investigators, suggested that the man who inspired assassination of his father was the civil governor of Valencia, Manuel Molina Conejero. Having arrived in Grau few hours later, the Valencian socialist militants detained Noguera; he was driven few kilometres away and shot at a roadside.

== Aftermath ==
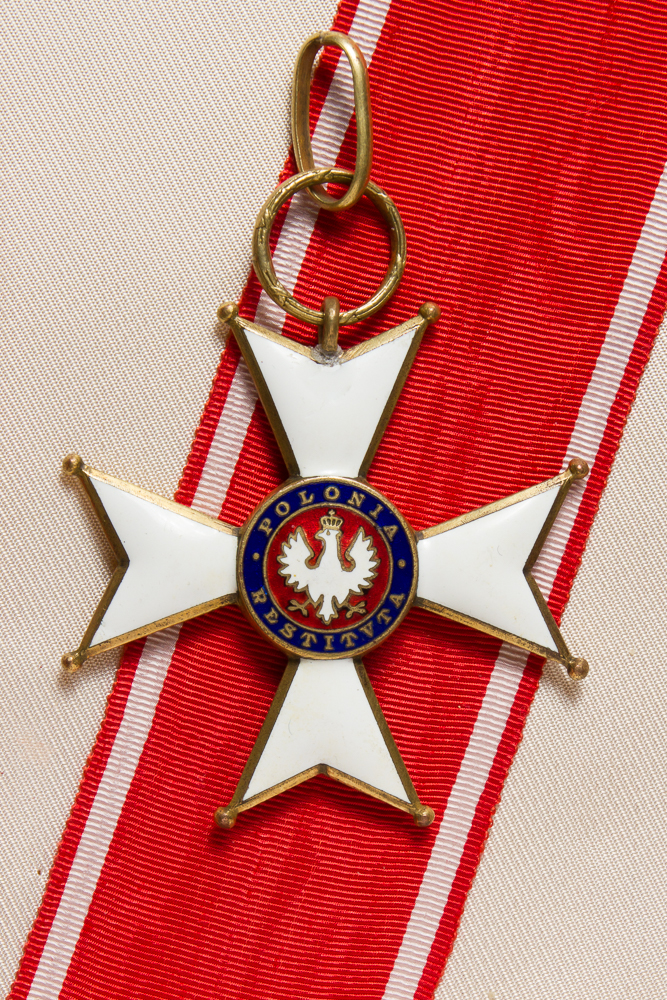
Polonia Restituta order

Noguera's wife and children were briefly detained in Juventudes Socialistas premises in Grau. They were later released and the Polish legacy made numerous representations to secure their departure from Republican Spain. Following few futile attempts to leave the country the case was eventually discussed by Alvarez del Vayo and Largo Caballero during one of the cabinet sittings, before in September the family managed to leave Republican Spain. The Polish legacy lodged a formal complaint, related also to the inviolability status of the consul. The Spanish MFA first responded that Noguera had carried compromising papers, which led to his detention, then attributed the incident to Noguera's conflict with his former employees, and eventually promised to carry out a thorough investigation. It has never produced any result. Noguera's apartment in Valencia was seized by Republican militias and following further and fruitless protests on part of the Poles, the consulate was formally closed in December 1936. Remnants of Noguera's property were confiscated by Caja General de Reparaciones, the official Republican institution engaged in expropriations, in March 1938. In 1937 Noguera was post mortem awarded the Officer's Cross of the Order of Polonia Restituta.

== See also ==
- Red Terror (Spain)
- Poland–Spain relations
- José Antonio Noguera Roig
