= List of Bulgarian military equipment of World War II =

WWII Bulgarian military equipment

The following is a list of Bulgarian military equipment of World War II which includes artillery, vehicles and vessels. During World War II Bulgaria was a neutral country until 1 March 1941. Then it allied with the Axis powers until 9 September 1944 and then it aligned with the Allies for the rest of war.

== Melee Weapons ==
=== Knives and Bayonets ===
- Mannlicher bayonet-knives - mod. 1888, mod. 1890 and mod. 1895. NCO versions also existed. Modified versions from trophy rifles in World War I to fit Mannlicher rifles also were used. Some were made into field (trench) knives, used by officers and NCOs instead of sabres in the trenches.
- Mosin-Nagant Bayonet mod. 1891 - 68 377 Mosin-Nagant with bayonets and 5 948 Mosin-Nagant without bayonets are listed in Bulgarian army inventory of 11.1938.
- S84/98 III bayonet - also the Polish(bayonet wz.29), Czechoslovak(bayonet vz. 24) and Yugoslav(bayonet mod. 1924) variations. The Czech variation could be used on the Zk-383 sub-machine gun as well.
- Combat knife mod. 1942 - used in reconnaissance units. Introduced in 1942–1943 in limited quantities.
- Fallschirmjägermesser - used by the Bulgarian Paratroopers (1943-1944).

=== Sabres ===
On 01.12.1939 the Bulgarian army had 18 256 sabres and 1 059 field knives. On 15.04.1940 the Bulgarian army had 18 298 sabres.

- NCO Sabre mod. 1927 - 3 361 available at 01.01.1944 2 964 by 01.01.1945, 2 868 by 01.01.1946
- Guards Sabre - Mod. 1909 for Officers and Mod. 1903/1924/1936 for the troopers in the Guards Cavalry Regiment. 712 available at 01.01.1944, 691 by 01.01.1945, 699 by 01.01.1946
- Cavalry sabre "Напред" - the sabre "Напред"("Forward") was supplied for the Bulgarian Cavalry Regiments from Austria-Hungary (Johann Zelinka, Wien) before the Balkan wars and was also used in World War I and II. 4 007 available at 01.01.1944, 2 659 by 01.01.1945, 2 102 by 01.01.1946
- German Cavalry Sword Mod. 1889 (Germany) - supplied from Germany in World War I for the troopers of the Bulgarian Cavalry Regiments (in Bulgaria known as "Орел" ("Eagle")). 5 853 available at 01.01.1944, 5 301 by 01.01.1945, 4 525 by 01.01.1946
- Cavalry sabre mod. 1925 - also known as "Лъв"(Lion), produced between the wars. 3 293 available at 01.01.1944, 2 771 by 01.01.1945, 2 933 by 01.01.1946
- Generals sword - Two variants are known - mod. 1925 and mod. 1928. Very limited edition.

The Bulgarian Police gradually eliminated during the 1930s the use of the old sabres by the police officers and by the 1940s only the mounted police kept their cavalry sabres (402 by 01.12.1940). 500 more cavalry sabres were produced for the police in a workshop in Sofia in 1942 and then 2000 former French army cavalry sabres were supplied in 1943–1944.

== Small arms ==
=== Pistols and Automatic Pistols ===
8 444 pistols available on 01.12.1939 with the Bulgarian army 8 711 pistols available on 15.04.1940 with the Bulgarian army.

- 7.65mm Model 1900/1902 Parabellum (Germany) - pre WWI deliveries 144 still available on 01.01.1944, 111 on 01.01.1945, 109 on 01.01.1946
- 9mm Parabellum P-08 (Germany) - pre WWI and World War I deliveries 7 812 available on 01.01.1944, 6 183 on 01.01.1945 and 5 262 on 01.01.1946
- Dreyse M1907 (Germany) - World War I deliveries 763 available on 01.01.1944, 658 available on 01.01.1945 and 598 on 01.01.1946
- Langenhan pistol (Germany) - World War I deliveries 764 available on 01.01.1944, 539 available on 01.01.1945 and 463 on 01.01.1946
- Mauser Model 1914 (Germany) - World War I deliveries along with Model 1910 1 437 available on 01.01.1944, 1 225 available on 01.01.1945 and 1 173 on 01.01.1946
- Sauer 38H (Germany) - 2 000 ordered in 1941 and delivered in 1941-1943 4 239 available on 01.01.1944, 2 927 available on 01.01.1945 and 2 741 available on 01.01.1946
- Walther P38 (Germany) - 8 000 ordered in 1941, but Germany cancelled the deal. 2 000 ordered in 1942 and delivered in 1943 2 703 available on 01.01.1944, 2 550 available on 01.01.1945 and 2 279 available on 01.01.1946
- Radom pistol (Poland, Austria, Germany) - known as "VIS" or "Steyr" pistol in Bulgaria. 4 500 ordered in 1942. and delivered in 1943–1944. 4 230 available on 01.01.1944, 3 599 available on 01.01.1945 and 2 986 available on 01.01.1946.
- Star Model B (Spain) - 14 999 supplied in 1943-1944 from Star Bonifacio Echeverria 10 142 available on 01.01.1944, 10 936 on 01.01.1945 and 9 685 on 01.01.1946
- Browning Hi-Power (Belgium, Germany) - 800 in 7.65mm and 800 in 9mm are known to have been officially delivered in 1943 from Germany. Inventory shows however that more have been delivered - 935 9mm and 1 687 7.65mm available on 01.01.1944, 643 9mm and 685 7.65mm available on 01.01.1945 and 493 9mm and 1 109 7.65mm available on 01.01.1946
- ČZ vz. 27 (Czechoslovakia, Germany) - 6 500 delivered in 1943. 5 758 available on 01.01.1944, 4 983 on 01.01.1945 and 4 527 on 01.01.1946
- Walther PP (Germany) - 3 699 delivered. 2 703 available on 01.01.1944, 2 550 available on 01.01.1945 and 2 279 available on 01.01.1946

44 851 pistols were available with the Bulgarian army on 01.09.1944. In 1945 the Soviet deliveries included around 6 000 TT pistol, of which 4 921 are available on 01.01.1946.

The Bulgarian Police had its own supply of pistols. On 01.12.1940 it had 8 002 9mm pistols, 1 034 7.65mm pistols and 215 6.35mm pistols, including 800 ČZ vz. 38, 350 Sauer 38H, 650 Sauer Model 1930, 3 000 Beretta M1923, 120 7.65mm Melior Mod. 1920, Mauser Model 1914, Walther Model 4, 3 924 7.65mm and 9mm Parabellum P-08, etc. Deliveries continued during the war including 1 300 ČZ vz. 38, 120 CZ 36, 1 500 ČZ vz. 27, 520 Parabellum P-08, 5 000 Walther P38, 1 400 Walther PP, 500 Walther PPK, 3 000 Star Model B, etc.

The Bulgarian Partisans were using a wide assortment of pistols. It is estimated they had 3 180 pistols by 09.1944.

=== Submachine guns ===
Model	Origin	Cal.^{(mm)}	Users	Quantity (Note: All counted at January 1st for each year.)			Image	Details
Model	Origin	Cal.^{(mm)}	Users	1944	1945	1946	Image	Details
Submachine guns
ZK-383	Czechoslovakia	9	Army	4,083	3,357	3,043		4,000 guns bought in October 1941. 1,900 guns were supplied in December 1942, and 2,100 were supplied in February 1943. An additional 1,600 guns were ordered in March 1943, but only minimal quantities were delivered of this additional order, before Bulgaria joined the Allies in September 1944.
Suomi KP/-31	Finland	9	Police					500 guns delivered in 1942.
Suomi KP/-31	Finland	9	Partisans					500 guns delivered in 1942.
MP 18/I	Germany	9	Police					20 guns available in 1939.
MP 28/II	Germany	9	Police					70 guns available in 1939. 300 delivered during the war.
MP 28/II	Germany	9	Partisans					70 guns available in 1939. 300 delivered during the war.
MP 40	Germany	9	Army	7,680	5,429	5,440		8,475 guns were ordered under the "Barbara" supply programme from Germany in 1943 – 1944. 7,700 were supplied by June 1944.
MP 40	Germany	9	Gendarmerie	7,680	5,429	5,440		8,475 guns were ordered under the "Barbara" supply programme from Germany in 1943 – 1944. 7,700 were supplied by June 1944.
MP 40	Germany	9	Partisans	7,680	5,429	5,440		8,475 guns were ordered under the "Barbara" supply programme from Germany in 1943 – 1944. 7,700 were supplied by June 1944.
MP 41	Germany	9	Police					2,400 guns delivered during the war (1941 – 1944).
MP 41	Germany	9	Gendarmerie					2,400 guns delivered during the war (1941 – 1944).
MP 41	Germany	9	Partisans					2,400 guns delivered during the war (1941 – 1944).
PPSh-41	Soviet Union	7.62	Army			4,421		In 1945, massive soviet arms deliveries included 10,615 SMGs (PPSh-41 and PPS-43).
PPSh-41	Soviet Union	7.62	Partisans			4,421		In 1945, massive soviet arms deliveries included 10,615 SMGs (PPSh-41 and PPS-43).
PPS-43	Soviet Union	7.62	Army			6,152		In 1945, massive soviet arms deliveries included 10,615 SMGs (PPSh-41 and PPS-43).
PPS-43	Soviet Union	7.62	Partisans			6,152		In 1945, massive soviet arms deliveries included 10,615 SMGs (PPSh-41 and PPS-43).
Thompson M1928A1	United States	11.43	Partisans					Supplied by the Allies.

=== Rifles and Carbines ===
- Steyr-Mannlicher M1895 (Austria-Hungary, Austria, Czechoslovakia) - the main rifle of the Bulgarian army in the Balkan wars and World War I, this family of rifles and carbines remained with the Bulgarian army also in the Interwar period and in World War II. Multiple versions were used by the Bulgarian army, including domestic re-chambered "S" versions from the 1930s. Bulgaria was acquiring in the 1930s these rifles in small quantities and as parts from Czechoslovakia, Austria and Poland from the leftover Austro-Hungarian production, adding them to the available stocks. An army inventory list of 11.1938 showed the following availability - 184 713 rifles M1895 and 37 465 carbines M1895, 23 806 rifles M1888, 13 513 rifles M1888/90, 2 982 rifles M1890, 9 482 rifles M1886/1890, 4 567 carbines M1890, 7 899 carbines M1895/34, 2 066 carbines M1888/18 and 1 252 carbines M1886/34. In 1940 additional 74 000 rifles and carbines from the former Czechoslovak and Austrian army stocks were delivered from Germany. On 01.01.1944 the availability of Mannlicher rifles and carbines was 175 176 rifles M1895 and 99 936 carbines M1895, older rifle models (1886, 1888, 1890) - 39 897, carbines M1895/34 and M1886/34 - 52 021, older Mannlicher carbines (1888/18, 1890) - 8 608. On 01.01.1945 the availability of Mannlicher rifles and carbines was 125 048 rifles M1895 and 87 225 carbines M1895, 28 163 older Mannlicher rifles, carbines M1895/34 and M1886/34 - 42 724, older Mannlicher carbines - 7 407.
- Mosin–Nagant (Russia, Soviet Union) - in the Bulgarian army during World War I this was the second most used rifle in the Bulgarian army. 50 000 were ordered in 1912 from Russia, then in 1915-1918 there were massive deliveries from Germany and Austro-Hungary (over 250 000) of captured Russian rifles, plus the Bulgarian army managed to capture over 35 000 on its own. After the end of the war over 200 000 were sold in 1918–1921 to the White Russians. Some were destroyed by the Allied Control commission after World War I, but also some were confiscated from the retreating to Bulgaria White Russian Armies. By 11.1938 there were still some 74 325 in stock. On 01.12.1939 there are 69 493, then in 1940-1941 48 000 were sold to Finland, and 5000 (with 250 000 bullets) to Croatia in 1942, on 01.01.1944 - 15 192 available, on 01.01.1945 - 13 785, on 01.01.1946 - 14 149. 6 405 were supplied by the Soviet Union in 1945
- Karabiner 98k (Germany) - 85 526 were to be supplied from Germany under the Barbara supply programme in 1943–1944. 52 221 were delivered by 06.1944 - besides the German carbines, there were also former Polish (Karabinek wz. 1929), Yugoslav (see below) and Czechoslovak (vz. 24) "Mauser"s included in the deliveries. Some sources suggest the total deliveries have reached 71 500. 42 638 were available on 01.01.1944, 69 977 on 01.01.1945 and 68 637 on 01.01.1946

There were also some deliveries of Italian Carcano rifles - 8000 in 1943–1944, former Yugoslav army's Model 24 Mausers - approximately 6–8000. In 1945 the Soviet Union supplied 978 Mosin-Nagant sniper rifles and 5-6000 SVT-40 automatic rifles.

On 01.12.1939 the Bulgarian army had 225 276 rifles Mannlicher and 112 608 carbines Mannlicher and 69 493 rifles Mosin-Nagant.

On 15.04.1940 the Bulgarian army had 228 636 rifles Mannlicher and 103 742 carbines Mannlicher and 62 278 rifles Mosin-Nagant, as well as 8 291 "dragoon carbines".

On 01.09.1944 the Bulgarian army had 219 649 rifles and 227 312 carbines.

On 01.01.1945 the Bulgarian army had 207 800 rifles and 140 000 carbines.

The Bulgarian Police had on 01.12.1940 6 363 Mannlicher Carbines, mostly converted domestically from rifles. In 1940-1944 Mannlicher parts and used rifles and carbines are supplied (4 600 second-hand rifles and carbines and parts for 12 200 more) and the older Carbines in use are slowly discarded. By 31.03.1943 - 8 834 carbines are available with the Police. The number increased to 12 509 carbines and 1000 rifles at the beginning of 1944. In 1941 after the occupation of Yugoslavia and Greece, the Germans supplied to the Bulgarian Police 2 954 former Greek Army Mannlicher–Schönauer mod.1903/14 and 3 530 former Yugoslav army FN Model 24 and Model 30 - Mauser Mod. 1924 and 1929. In 1943 after the Italian units on the Balkans have been disarmed, 28 800 Carcano rifles and carbines have been given to the Bulgarian Police - 18 000 were given to the Municipal Police, 3 300 to the State Police, the others were used as reserve or to arm paramilitary units. In 07.1943 the Bulgarian Police also bought 2600 Mosin–Nagant and supplied these to the Municipal Police. The Municipal Police and the Paramilitary units were also using a wide assortment of older pre-WWI vintage rifles and carbines like Berdan rifle, Mauser, etc.

The Bulgarian Partisans used a wide assortment of older and contemporary rifles and carbines of various origin, estimated to number approximately 7 600 by 09.1944.

=== Infantry and dual-purpose machine guns ===
- Madsen machine gun (Denmark) - 660 Madsen M02 Light Machine Guns ordered in 12.1914 and delivered in the summer of 1915. 1000 Madsen M24 Light Machine guns ordered in 1928 and supplied from Denmark in the standard for the Bulgarian army 8×50mmR Mannlicher. A total of 2 570 have been supplied by 1945, 2 379 exist in the inventories by 01.01.1944, 1308 by 01.01.1945, 1390 by 01.01.1946
- ZB vz. 26 (Czechoslovakia) - 3000 ZB-39 Light Machine Guns ordered in the end of 1938 in the standard for the Bulgarian army from 1934 8×56mmR. Delivered in 02–03.1940. In 07.1941 additional 334 units ordered and delivered in 04.1942. 3 195 exist in the inventories by 01.01.1944, 2 731 by 01.01.1945, 2 539 by 01.01.1946.
- ZB vz. 30 (Czechoslovakia) - Former Czechoslovak army 7.92mm machine guns were also delivered in 1939-1941 and used by the army as "Zbrojovka" light machine guns (ZB vz. 30) - 372 LMG of these were available on 01.01.1944, 263 LMG on 01.01.1945 and 109 LMG on 01.01.1946.
- ZB-53 (Czechoslovakia) - Former Czechoslovak army 7.92mm machine guns were also delivered in 1939-1941 and used by the army as "Zbrojovka" heavy machine guns (ZB-53) - 212 HMG of these were available on 01.01.1944, 103 HMG on 01.01.1945 and 35 HMG on 01.01.1946.
- MG 30 (Austria) - 244 former Austrian army 8mm light machine guns were delivered in 1939, with another delivery of 500 following that in late 1940. Further deliveries in the following years brought the available "Steyr"s to at least 940, although 1233 are shown as available on 01.01.1944, 826 by 01.01.1945 and 982 by 01.01.1946.
- MG 34 (Germany) - 4 522 light and 1 015 heavy 7.92mm MG 34 were supplied from Germany in 1943-1944. 1 067 HMG and 3 305 LMG were available at 01.01.1944, 1 191 HMG and 4 064 LMG on 01.01.1945 (alternative source indicates 1 012 HMG and 3 215 LMG), 734 HMG and 4 134 LMG at 01.01.1946
- MG 42 (Germany) - none were officially supplied, but some were captured in the 1944-1945 and some were delivered from Soviet Union trophies and the number available was 699 by 01.01.1946
- Schwarzlose machine gun (Austria-Hungary, Austria) - 2 014 were supplied from Austria-Hungary during World War I, but only a few were retained after the end of the war during the 1920s, both officially as permitted armament of the Bulgarian armed forces as per the Neuilly treaty restrictions and also hidden from the Allied Control Commission. 150 were bought from Poland in 1935. 1 000 more were supplied from the former Austrian army stocks in 1939-1940. Total deliveries are reported to be 3 404, 2 923 were available by 01.01.1944, 2 106 by 01.01.1945 and 2 234 by 01.01.1946
- MG 08 (Germany) - these German heavy machine guns were supplied to Bulgaria before the Balkan wars and during World War I. As with Schwarzlose machine gun, some were retained after the war, both officially and as hidden supplies. Inventories show 1262 different "Maxim" machine guns available on 01.01.1944, 1189 on 01.01.1945 and 1038 on 01.01.1946
- Chauchat (France) - these French light machine guns were known to the Bulgarian army since World War I, when it used a limited number of captured ones. 36 former Yugoslav army LeMG 147(j) were delivered in 1943. The Bulgarian police also used some.
- ZB-60 (Czechoslovakia) - 19 of these 15mm Anti-Air machine Guns were delivered. Inventories show 19 available on 01.01.1944, 30 on 01.01.1945 and 23 on 01.01.1946

The Bulgarian Army had 4 252 light machine Guns and 3 296 heavy machine guns on 01.12.1939. On 15.04.1940 there were 5784 light machine guns and 3291 heavy machine guns. By 01.09.1944 the numbers had risen to 10 328 light machine guns and 5 191 heavy machine guns. After the first phase of the war with Germany a number of these were lost and 01.01.1945 the Bulgarian army had 8 555 light machine guns (5 340 8mm Madsen, Zbrojovka and Steyr MG-30 and 3 215 7.92mm MG-34) and 4 605 heavy machine guns (3 505 8mm Maxims and Schwarzlose and 1 012 7.92mm MG-34). The first Soviet deliveries arrived in 1945 and included 762 DP-28, 562 PM M1910 и 37 DShK 1 362 DP-28, 717 PM M1910 and 2 DShK are shown as available on 01.01.1946

The Bulgarian Police had their own modest number of machine-guns, supplied independently from the Army. Thus on 01.12.1940 it had 27 machine guns, both heavy and light - a curious mixture of Maxim gun, Lewis gun, Hotchkiss Mle 1914 machine gun and Chauchat - mostly leftover trophies from World War I and/or seized during police actions. 42 additional light machine guns ZB vz. 27 are bought in 1941 and then in 1943 50 heavy machine guns Ckm wz. 30 and 100 Browning wz. 1928 were bought from Germany in 1943 from the trophies from the 1939 Polish Army. Then finally on 09.1943 200 MG-34 were supplied to the police. Thus the Police had on 01.07.1944 50 heavy and 342 light machine guns. Of these the 50 heavy machine guns and 100 MG-34 were transferred to the newly formed Gendarmerie.

The Bulgarian Partisans also had machine-guns. It is estimated they had 54 heavy machine guns and 531 light machine guns by 09.1944, including Soviet and Allied deliveries.

=== Grenades and grenade launchers ===
Bulgaria had a long tradition (since the beginning of the 20th century) of producing its own hand grenades This was continued in the Interwar period and during World War II in the State Military Factory at Kazanlak

- Bulgarian defensive hand stick grenade - evolution of the older Bulgarian "Odrin" hand grenade combined with a stick.
- Bulgarian offensive hand stick grenade - based on the Stielhandgranate Model 1917 209 130 grenades were available in 12.1939. 117 694 grenades were available in 04.1940.

German supplied hand grenades were also used like:

- Stielhandgranate 24
- Eierhandgranate 39 - 165 000 supplied in 1943
- Stielhandgranate 43
- Blendkörper 1H and Blendkörper 2H, Nebelkerzen, Nebelhandgranate 39 - these German smoke grenades were supplied to Bulgaria during the war. For example, in 1943 205 732 smoke grenades were delivered

The Bulgarian Police had its own modest supply of grenades - 1 954 available on 01.12.1940. It was supplied both from the Bulgarian State Military Factory and from German deliveries, as well from captured Allied and Soviet airdrop deliveries to the Bulgarian partisans.

The Bulgarian partisans were using the grenades cited above, its own illegally produced grenades and Allied and Soviet supplied grenades like the British No. 36 Mk. 1 Mills bomb

Soviet Union supplied in 1944-1945 some 300 000 grenades, like RGD-33, RPG-6, etc.

189 375 hand grenades of different types have been used in the war against the Axis in 1944-1945

There was one rifle grenade launcher used in the period:

- Schiessbecher (Germany) - 3 600 Gewehrgranatgerät for the 7.92mm K98 were supposed to be delivered in 1943-1944 under the Barbara supply programme from Germany. 2 800 were actually delivered. 2 641 were available on 01.01.1944, 2 331 on 01.01.1945, 2 250 on 01.01.1946 There were 127 000 grenades for these in 09.1944 36 432 grenades have been used in the war against the Axis in 1944-1945

=== Flamethrowers ===
- Flammenwerfer 41 (Germany) - 210 supplied in 1943-1944 under the Barbara supply programme from Germany and were used by the Assault Pioneers/Engineers units in the Bulgarian army.

=== Vehicle and aircraft machine guns ===
- Schwarzlose machine gun - 14 on the L3/33 delivered in 1935.
- MG08 - 8 on the Vickers Mk E delivered in 1936 8 on the 4 Drazki class torpedo boats. 4 on the 2 Motor Launch class vedettes.
- MG 15 - 36 on the 12 Dornier Do 11. ? on the Dornier Do 17. 12 on the 12 Junkers Ju 87R. 12 on the 12 Heinkel He 45. 2 on each of the Focke-Wulf Fw 189 Uhu A-1 12 on the 12 DAR-3 Garvan III. 15 on the 15 Fieseler Fi 156 Storch. 2 on each Focke-Wulf Fw 58 Weihe 4 on the 4 Heinkel He 60 12 the 12 Arado Ar 196 20 on 20 Arado Ar 96
- MG 17 machine gun - 24 on the 12 Heinkel He 51 24 on the 12 Arado Ar 65. 38 on 19 Messerschmitt Bf 109E. 118 on the 59 Messerschmitt Bf 109G-2. 24 on 12 Junkers Ju 87R. 12 on the 12 Heinkel He 45 36 on the 18 Focke-Wulf Fw 189 Uhu A-1 and A-2 12 on the 12 DAR-3 Garvan III. 12 the 12 Arado Ar 196 12 on the 6 Focke-Wulf Fw 56 Stösser 20 on 20 Arado Ar 96
- ZB-53 - 72 (2 each) on the 36 Panzer 35(t) delivered in 1940-1941 19 (2 each) on the 10 Panzer 38(t) delivered in 1943
- 7.92mm Colt-Browning MG 40 - 48 on the 12 PZL P.24
- vz. 30 - 312? on 78 Avia B-534 24 on 12 Avia B-135 96 on 32 Avia B-71 224 on 56 Letov S-328. 200 on 50 Kaproni Bulgarski KB-11 Fazan 7 on 2 DAR 10 3 on Aero A.304
- Reibel machine gun - 40 on the R-35 delivered in 1941. Later another 19 on the 19 H-39 for the Bulgarian Gendermerie in 1944.
- MG 34 - 176 (2 each) on the 88 Panzer IV delivered in 1943-1944 50 on the 50 StuG III delivered in 1943-1944 20 on the 20 Sd.Kfz.222 10 on the 5 Drazki class torpedo boats 6 on the 3 Lürssen torpedo boats 1 on each of the 13 MCK type minesweepers 1 on each of the 4 Maritza type minesweepers
- MAC 1934 - 400 or 396 on the 100 or 98 Dewoitine D.520. 36 on the 12 Bloch MB.200.
- MG 131 machine gun - 164 on the 82 Messerschmitt Bf 109G-6 and later modifications. 1 on the Heinkel He 111H-16
- MG 81 machine gun - ? on the ?Junkers Ju 87Ds 2 on each Focke-Wulf Fw 189 Uhu A-2 3 on the Heinkel He 111H-16
- Karabin maszynowy wz. 33 - 45 on the 45KB-5
- Karabin maszynowy wz. 36 - 100 on the 50 PZL.43. 45 on the 45 KB-5
- Vickers machine gunF - 100 on the 50 PZL.43.? on KB-4

== Artillery ==
=== Infantry mortars ===
The Bulgarian army used German and Austro-Hungarian supplied mortars in World War I. Most of these mortars (380 by the end of World War I) were handed over to the Allied Control Commission after the war with 40 officially remaining as allowed weapons of the much reduced Bulgarian army by the Neuilly treaty. These "Erhardt" mortars were obsolete by mid-30s, so one of the first delivery priorities for the Bulgarian army in the years before World War 2 was to obtain modern mortars.

- 8 cm Granatwerfer 34 (Germany) - 320 (or 254 by other sources) were ordered in 1936 from Germany (in addition 120 were ordered in 1938). Unlike the later mortars, officially known in the Bulgarian army as "M34", these are named "Rheinmetall M36". The total deliveries of these "Rheinmetall" mortars are estimated at 480, of the "M34" at 1400. 196 of these arrived in 1937, 160 more in 1938–1939, 160 in the first half of 1940, 1400 in 1943. There were 479 "Rheinmetall" and 1006 "M34" by 01.01.1944, 366 and 1229 respectively on 01.01.1945 and 387 and 1165 respectively on 01.01.1946
- Brandt Mle 27/31 (France) - Bulgaria negotiated unsuccessfully in 1936 with France for a contract for supply of 60 Brandt mortars in 1936. Later in 1942-1944 up to 812 former French army 8.14 cm GrW 278(f) were delivered from Germany. 518 were available on 01.01.1944, 380 on 01.01.1945 and 328 on 01.01.1946.
- 5 cm Granatwerfer 36 (Germany) - 812 delivered in 1943 794 available on 01.01.1944, 669 (698 by other sources) by 01.01.1945, 529 by 01.01.1946

The Bulgarian army had 367 mortars on 01.12.1939. This was increased to 479 on 15.04.1940. By 01.09.1944 the availability was increased to 2198 80 mm mortars and 800 50 mm mortars. On 01.01.1945 the army had 1465 (1595 by other sources) M34 and Rheinmetalls, 380 Brandts and 698 50mm M36. Soviet equipment arrived in 1945 - 278 82mm 82-BM-37 and 90 120mm 120-PM-43 mortar

The Bulgarian partisans also had a few mortars - 9 by 09.1944

=== Field and Mountain artillery ===
==== Field Guns ====
The Bulgarian divisional artillery in World War 2 still retained quick-firing 75mm field pieces of pre-World War I origin that were coming of diverse sources:

- Schneider-Canet 75 mm field gun Mod. 1904 (France) - 324 ordered for the Bulgarian army in 1906 and delivered until 1909. This was the main gun of the divisional artillery regiments in the Balkan wars and in the World War I.
- Schneider-Canet 75 mm field gun Mod. 1907 (France) - former Serbian army guns, about 180 captured in 1915. Also 9 more of this type were captured from the French army on the Salonika front in 1916.
- Schneider-Canet 75 mm field gun Mod. 1908 (France) - former Greek army guns, 8 captured in 1916
- Krupp 75 mm field gun Mod. 1904 and Mod. 1908 (Germany) - former Romanian army guns, about 115 captured in 1916-1917
- Krupp 75mm field gun Mod. 1904, Mod. 1908, Mod. 1910 and Mod. 1913 (Germany)- former Turkish army guns, about 140-150 captured from the Ottoman Empire in 1912–1913, then 20-25 from the Serbian army in 1915 and 30-35 from the Greek army in 1916 (also former Turkish guns).

Usually in the Bulgarian Army documents this motley of Schnedier and Krupp 75 mm guns is simply listed as 75мм полски оръдия ("75mm field guns") or 75мм возими оръдия ("75mm horse-drawn guns"), which makes it difficult to differentiate between the models listed above. It is known that during the World War I until 09.1918 340 of the above-mentioned guns were put out of action (but most were repaired or replaced) and 40 more captured by the Entente forces. 707 75mm field guns were available in 09.1918 just before the Allied Offensive with the number dropping to 487 at 01.01.1919. 248 were officially listed as captured in September 1918 by the Entente forces. Then a number of guns were destroyed by the Allied Control Commission after the war as per the Neuilly treaty restrictions, but some were retained as officially permitted weapons and quite a lot were hidden and later retaken into service. Thus on 01.12.1939 the Bulgarian army still had 412 of these 75 mm guns. At the end of 1942 there were 276 75mm "Schneider" and 215 75mm "Krupp" in the Bulgarian army. In 05.1943 there were 394 75mm field guns, in 08.1944 - 474 75mm field guns and in 01.1945 - 421.

There were a number of modernization efforts in 1930-1940s carried out in Bulgaria of these 75mm field guns which involved:

1. Stanchev and Dobrev Gun Carriage (СД-34) - in 1934-1935 the artillery Engineer Colonel Dimitar Stanchev (Deputy Head of the State Military Factory) and the artillery technician Gocho Dobrev (Head of the Artillery Workshop at the State Military Factory) developed a project for modernizing the gun carriage of the 75mm Krupp field guns (in 1939 Dobrev and another technician Stoyan Minkov developed a similar proposal for the 75mm Schneider field guns). The idea was to use the gun carriage of the 10.5 cm leFH 16 as a model and to implement it on the 75 mm guns in the Bulgarian army via replacement at the State Military Factory in Kazanlak. This modernization, carried out gradually from 1936 onwards, allowed to increase the maximum elevation of the guns from 26 to 40-45 degrees and thus to increase the range from 6 to 11 km. Initially this modernization created problems with the equilibrators and the hydraulic recoil mechanisms - the absorbers and the recuperators. As these were not replaced in the initial modernized carriages and were estimated for lower degrees, when gun elevation was used at 40-45 degrees with the new carriage, the recoil needed to be finalized by hand. The equilibrators problem was fixed by the artillery engineer Captain Ivan Stefanov along with the artillery technician Chushkov in 1936, but the Recoil mechanisms was finally fixed after trials only in 1942-1943 by a group of artillery engineers (captain Petar Ivanov and Captain Ivan Kisyov) led by Ivan Stefanov.
2. Converting to towed carriage for motor traction - in 1936 a group of artillery technicians led by Lazar Velitchkov developed special towed carriages for towing 75 mm guns with speeds to up to 40 km/h by the then available trucks "Steyr" and "Morris Commercial"
3. Replacing the worn gun barrels - in 1936-1937 the Artillery Engineer Captain Ivan Stefanov developed a project for the replacement of the barrels of the 75mm field guns, which were in bad condition. After detailed studies and negotiations with Krupp and Rheinmetall in Germany, this project was approved and equipment for a new workshop in the State Military Factory in Kazanlak was acquired in order to allow the replacement of the gun barrels in 1938–1940. In 1936-1944 approximately 400 guns were modernized in the factory with new gun carriages, barrels, equilibrators and recoil mechanisms

Each Bulgarian Divisional Artillery Regiment had 1-2 artillery battalions with 12-24 75mm field guns (3-6 batteries) during the World War II.

- 7.7 cm FK 16 (Germany) - 20 were received during World War I (18 survived the war). 14 were still in use on 01.12.1939. 16 were available on 15.04.1940. Somewhere in the 1943-1944 these were withdrawn from service.
- 9cm Feldkanone C/80 (Germany) - 10 of these 19th century not-quick firing guns were still in service on 01.12.1939, but were retired in late 1940.
- Canon de 75 mle GP III (Belgium, Germany) - 32 horse-traction ones were acquired in 1942 from Germany from the former Belgium army stocks. Unlike the former Belgian 105 mm howitzers also obtained at that time, that saw wide use with the Bulgarian artillery, virtually nothing is known about the use of these guns. 2 surviving examples are still listed in 1947 as "7.5 см возими оръдия белгийски" in the army inventory lists of old guns, discontinued from service.

==== Mountain Guns and Howitzers ====
The Bulgarian army had 189 75mm mountain guns on 01.12.1939, including:

- Canon de 75 mm Modèle 1907 Schneider-Canet (France) - these pre-WWI quick-firing mountain guns (and the captured variations from other armies in the Balkans in 1912–1917) were being replaced by the Skoda mountain guns during World War I and later by other modern mountain guns, but a small number of these were retained at least until 08.1944.
- Krupp 75 mm mountain gun Mod. 1904 (Germany) - these pre-WWI quick-firing mountain guns (and the captured variations from other armies in the Balkans in 1912–1917) were being replaced by the Skoda mountain guns during World War I and later by other modern mountain guns, but a small number of these were retained at least until 08.1944.

48 of the old Schneider and Krupp quick firing mountain guns were still in service in 08.1944

223 75mm mountain guns were available on 15.04.1940.

- Skoda 75 mm Model 15 (Austria-Hungary) - 144 of these mountain guns were received during World War I. 36 were lost until 09.1918, including 4 that were captured. 47 more were lost during the September 1918 retreat, captured by the Entente forces. The remaining guns were retained during the interwar period and served in World War II. 104 were available in 08.1944 and 94 in 01.1945
- Bofors 75 mm Model 1936 (Sweden, Germany) - in 1936 48 of these guns were ordered from Krupp in Germany and 56 arrived in 1938. 40 more arrived in 1940. 8 more arrived in 1942. 104 were available in 08.1944, 71 in 01.1945. Bulgarian designation was "Krupp-Bofors Mod. 1936" or just "Bofors".

In 05.1943 there were 200 mountain guns in the Bulgarian army.

- 7.5 cm Gebirgsgeschütz 36 (Germany) - 90 were supposed to be supplied in 1944 under the Barbara supply programme from Germany, but only 20 were delivered before Bulgaria switched sides. Bulgarian designation was "75mm D/19 Mod. 1936"

Each Bulgarian Divisional Artillery Regiment had 1 artillery battalion with 12 75mm mountain guns (3 batteries) during the World War II. There were also separate artillery battalions (4 batteries with 16 guns in total) on army level (4 in total)

- 10.5 cm Gebirgshaubitze L/12 (Germany) - 16 delivered from Germany during World War I. 14 survived the war and were still available during World War II with the Bulgarian army.

==== Field Howitzers ====
During World War I Germany supplied 172 of the following models of 105 mm field howitzers:

- 10.5 cm Feldhaubitze 98/09 (Germany) - supplied from Germany during World War I. Bulgarian designation is 105-мм возима гаубица Д-12 “Круп” обр. 98/09.
- 10.5 cm leFH 16 (Germany) and 10.5cm lFH Krupp (Germany) - supplied from Germany during World War I. Bulgarian designations is 105-мм возима гаубица Д-20 “Круп” обр. 1916 and 105-мм возима гаубица Д-22 “Круп” ("Рейнска гаубица") обр. 1916

Also a similar model was captured from Romania in 1916-1917:

- 10.5 cm Feldhaubitze M.12 (Romania, Germany) - about 40 of these guns were captured from Romanian army in 1916-1917 and some were still in use in the Bulgarian army in World War II. Bulgarian designation is 105-мм возима гаубица Д-14 “Круп” обр. 1912 румънска.

120 of the above-mentioned types of 105 mm field howitzers survived the war (incl. 67 L/12 and 45 L/20 and L/22, etc.) 117 were available in 08.1944, 91 in 01.1945. In 1943-1944 these old 105 mm howitzers underwent modernization at the State Military Factory similar to that of the 75mm field guns and including:

1. Replacing the worn gun barrels with new ones - starting with the L/20 howitzers, but also on the L/12 ones.
2. Replacing the recoil mechanisms (absorbers and recuperators, springs) with the recoil reduced from 1400mm to 850-1000mm.
- Obusier de 120 mm mle 15TR (France) - 36 of the earlier model Mle. 1909 bought by Bulgaria in 1907. 24 more of the Mle. 1910 and Mle. 1915 were captured from the Serbian army in 1915. 38 survived the war, 36 were available in 12.1939, 35 in 08.1944, then 22 were lost during the retreat of the Bulgarian 5th army in early days of September 1944 and 13 remained in 01.1945 Bulgarian designation is 120мм скорострелна полска возима гаубица Д/13 "Шнайдер".

Howitzers supplied in the Interwar period and during World War II included:

- Rheinmetall 105mm L/30 gun-howitzers (Germany - early development versions of 10.5 cm leFH 18) - 40 ordered in 1938, 60 received in 1939, 24 more ordered in 1939 and received in 1940. Total received and available in 08.1944 and 01.1945 - 84.
- 10.5 cm leFH 18 howitzers (Germany) - 252 were to be delivered in 1943–1944, 232 were actually available in 08.1944 and 210 in 01.1945. In 1945 the Soviet Union provided at least 100 more, plus some were captured in 1944-1945 by the Bulgarian army, as in 1947 there were still 352 in armament in the Bulgarian army.
- Obusier de 105 GP 105 mm (Belgium, Germany) - 180 were supplied from Germany from the trophies from the former Belgian army. 40 were motor drawn and 140 horse drawn. 180 available in 08.1944 and 158 in 01.1945. Bulgarian designation is 105мм гаубица Д/22 "Белгийска".

Each Bulgarian Divisional Artillery Regiment had 1-2 artillery battalions with 12-24 105mm or 120mm field howitzers (3-6 batteries) during the World War II. The Army level (Heavy) Artillery Regiments (4 in total) also had 2 battalions with 24 105 mm howitzers, as well as 1 battalion in the Motorized Artillery Regiment that was directly subordinated to the Bulgarian High Command. The Army level regiments and the HQ Arty Regiment were using the most modern howitzers available and capable of motorized traction, as these 5 regiments were fully motorized, unlike the divisional artillery regiments, which were (apart from the one in the Armoured Brigade and the one in the Cavalry Division) entirely horse-drawn.

==== Heavy Artillery ====
- 10.5cm Belagerungskanone L/30 (Germany) - 18 captured in 1913 from Turkey at Edirne, 12 available at the Bulgaria's entry into the World War I. 12 survived the war Bulgarian designation is 105мм (10.5см) скорострелно оръдие Д-30 “Круп”.
- 10 cm K 14 (Germany) - 16 transferred from Germany during World War I. 11 or 12 survived the war. Bulgarian designation is 105мм (10.5см) скорострелно оръдие Д-35 “Круп”.

The above guns were used also in World War II, with 22 available in 12.1939, 24 in 08.1944 and 23 in 01.1945. In 1935-1937 these were modernized by creating a special towed carriage for motor traction - in 1936 a group of artillery technicians led by Marin Aleksandrov developed special towed carriages from second hand rear axis of discarded trucks "Benz" and "Renault" from WWI for towing by Pavesi tractors. Projects for replacing the worn barrels, modernizing the springs and the recoil mechanisms, etc. were also developed, but there is no data that these have been actually carried out.

- 10 cm schwere Kanone 18 (Germany) - In June 1939 Bulgaria ordered 18 of these guns from Germany. 34 were received in 1940. Further 36 of the L/52 calibre were to be supplied under the Barbara programme, but by 06.1944 none have been delivered. Nevertheless, some more must have been supplied, as army inventory lists 46 in 08.1944 and 44 in 01.1945. Bulgarian designation is 105мм Д/52 и Д/56 "дълго оръдие" Круп.
- 120 mm Schneider-Canet M1897 long gun (France) - 10 of these 19th century slow firing guns were still available in 12.1939, but were retired with the delivery of the Krupp "long guns". Bulgarian designation is 120мм нескорострелно оръдие Д/28 "Шнайдер".
- 122 mm gun M1931/37 (A-19) (Soviet Union) - 24 of these guns, captured by Germans in Soviet Union, were delivered under the Barbara supply programme in 1943. Known as 122мм моторизирани оръдия Д/46. (Note: A photo of their use in 1944 can be found.)
- 15cm sFH 05 (Germany) - 18 of these L/14 quick-firing howitzers were captured from the Ottoman Empire in 1913 at Edirne and were pressed into service with the Bulgarian army. Fourteen were available at the start of World War I, thirteen survived the war. 12 were still available in 08.1944 and 01.1945 The Aleksandrov specially developed carriages for motor traction (see above at 10 cm K14) were applicable for motor traction of these howitzers as well by Pavesi tractors.
- 15 cm sFH 13 (Germany) - 24 were transferred from German to Bulgarian control during World War I. Only 6 survived the war, the rest being captured by the Entente forces in September 1918. These 6 were used also during World War II up to 1945. Bulgarian designation is 150мм скорострелна гаубица Д/14 “Круп-13” (Обр. 13, Мод. 1913).
- lg. 15 cm sFH13 (Germany) - 8 of the longer barreled L/17 sFH 13 have been transferred from Germany during World War I. 7 survived the war and were used in World war II up to 1945. The Bulgarian designation is 150-мм скорострелна гаубица Д/17 “Круп”
- 15 cm schwere Feldhaubitze M 14 (Austria-Hungary) - imported from Austria-Hungary during World War I in limited quantity. 4 are known to have been in service at 08.1944. 5 were listed in 1947 as guns not longer in service. Bulgarian designation is 150мм гаубица Д/14 “Шкода” обр. 1916.
- 15 cm sFH 18 (Germany) - 24 received from Germany in 1939, 20 more in 1940. 51 available in 08.1944, 50 in 01.1945 Bulgarian designation is 150мм гаубица Д/30 "Круп" обр. 1939.
- 152 mm howitzer M1910 (Russia, Germany) - 24 captured ones supplied by Germany in World War I. 3 survived the war and were in storage in World War II. Some sources suggest their active use. Bulgarian designation is 150мм Д/15 руска гаубица.
- Canon de 155 C modèle 1917 Schneider (France) - 28 of these howitzers were bought from Germany (either French or Belgian army origin) in 1942.
- 220 mm TR mle 1915/1916 (France) - 8 of these howitzers were bought from Germany (either French or Belgian army origin) in 1942.

The Bulgarian army had 5 regiments of heavy artillery - 4 were army ones (each army was supposed to have one, but 5th was never formed) and 1 (formed in 1942 and containing the heaviest calibres available 105 mm to 220 mm) was directly subordinated to the Bulgarian army High Command. All were motorized, with the army ones having 4 battalions (usually 2 of 105 mm and 2 of 150 mm) and an ATG battery and the High Command one 5 battalions.

=== Coastal Artillery ===
In 12.1939 Bulgaria had 2 battalions of coastal artillery (defending the Black sea ports of Varna and Burgas respectively) with 28 old guns, including:

- Canon de 100 mm Modèle 1891 (France) - 4 of these pre-WWI naval guns were bought from France in 1900 for the Bulgarian torpedo gunboat Nadezhda, but were mostly used as coastal guns. Still in use in World War II. In 1939 these were modernized by increasing the elevation from 12 to 40 degrees and thus the range has been increased to 16 km. Bulgarian designation is 100мм оръдие Д/50 “Шнайдер”.
- 107 mm gun M1910 (Russia) - 4 of these captured heavy field guns were assigned to the coastal artillery of Burgas during World War I and survived until World War II. Bulgarian designation is 105мм брегово оръдие Д/28
- 120 mm Schneider-Canet M1897 long gun (France) - 2 of these slow-firing heavy field guns have been "loaned" to the coastal artillery during World War I for the defense of Varna. Abandoned after the war in their position, these were officially retired only in 1949, but in practice were never used during the Interwar period or World War II. Bulgarian designation is 120мм нескорострелно оръдие Д/28
- 150 mm/L25 Krupp Model 1891 heavy fortress gun (Germany) - 2 of these pre-WWI slow-firing fortress guns in a single turret have been captured from Romania in World War I and were still in use in World War II. Bulgarian designation is 150мм двуцевно нескорострелно оръдие Д/25 "Круп" обр. 1885.
- 15 cm Ring Kanone C/92 (Germany) - 2 of these pre-WWI slow-firing heavy guns have been "loaned" to the coastal defense of Burgas during World War I, then have been abandoned after the war and were officially retired only in 1944. Bulgarian designation is 150мм дълго нескорострелно оръдие Д/30 "Круп".
- 15 cm L/40 Feldkanone i.R (Germany) - 4 of these pre-WWI naval guns on wheeled carriages have been transferred from Germany in World War I and 2 were still in use in World War II. Bulgarian designation is 150мм оръдие Д/40 германско "Круп".
- 152 mm 45 caliber Pattern 1892 (Russia) - 4 of these pre-WWI Russian guns, captured and delivered from Germany in 1916 to defend the Black sea port of Varna. Still in use in World War II. Bulgarian designation is 150мм брегово оръдие Д/45 "Шнайдер".
- 21 cm L/35 (Germany) - 2 of these pre-WWI slow-firing guns, captured from Romania, survived World War I and were still in use in the coastal defense of the port of Burgas at the Black sea during World War II. Bulgarian designation is 210мм нескорострелно оръдие Д/35.
- 9-inch mortar M1877 (Russia) - 2 of these pre-WWI mortars, that have been captured in World War I and used to defend Varna. Still in use at the beginning of World War II, but have been withdrawn from service by 1943. Bulgarian designation is 230мм Д/7 мортира.
- Schneider-Canet 240 mm coast gun M. 1907 (France) - 2 pre-WWI coastal guns, bought in 1906 from France to defend the Black sea port of Varna. Still in use in World War II. Bulgarian designation is 240мм брегово оръдие Д/45 “Шнайдер”.
- 254 mm 45 caliber Pattern 1891 (Russia) - 2 pre-WWI Russian guns, captured and delivered from Germany in 1916 to defend the Black sea port of Varna. Still in use in World War II Bulgarian designation is 250мм брегово оръдие Д/45.

In 09.1940 Bulgaria acquired from Germany 5 more guns (former naval ones, received in 1942):

- 24 cm SK L/40 (Germany) - 2 of these were acquired for the coastal defense of Burgas. One was found to be practically worn out, the other was 90% worn out. Bulgarian designation is 240мм брегово оръдие Д/40
- 17 cm SK L/40 gun (Germany) - 3 of these were acquired for the coastal defense of Varna, complete with a stereoscopic range-finder (6m base). These were found to be 75% worn out. Bulgarian designation is 170мм брегово оръдие Д/40

After the occupation of Aegean Thrace, in 05.1941 a new coastal artillery battalion was formed there. Initially Bulgaria have been loaned from the German Heeres-Küsten-Artillerie-Abteilung 829:

- Canon de 155mm GPF (France) - 12 of these 15.5 cm K 418(f) were loaned to Bulgaria from Germany in 05.1941. Later in 03.1943 another 18 guns were supplied from Germany. All were used in the coastal artillery of the Aegean Thrace. Bulgarian designation is 155мм брегово оръдие Д/28 "Филу-Пюис" (Филу-Питу).

By 1944 the coastal artillery has expanded to 4 artillery regiments - 2 on the Black sea (Varna and Burgas) and 2 on the Aegean sea (Kavala and Dedeagach/Alexandroupolis). In 1943-1944 under the Barbara programme the following guns were supplied from Germany as coastal artillery:

- Canon de 105 mle 1913 Schneider (France) - 6 10.5 cm K 338(j) and 12 10.5 cm K 331(f) were supplied from Germany in 1943 (former Yugoslav and French army trophies). Bulgarian designation is 105мм Д/28 оръдие "Шнайдер" обр. 1913 и 1918
- 10.5 cm hruby kanon vz. 35 (Czechoslovakia) - 6 10.5 cm K 339(j) were supplied from Germany in 1943 (former Yugoslav army trophies). Bulgarian designation is 105мм оръдие "Шкода" Д/42 обр. 1935
- Canon de 220 L mle 1917 (France) - 12 22-cm Kanone 532(f) were supplied from Germany in 1943. 4 were placed in defense of Burgas, the other 8 were placed in the Aegean coastal defense (one battery of 4 for each of the two regiments). Bulgarian designation is 220мм Д/35 оръдие "Шнайдер" обр. 1917

In 05.1944 six Pz. Kpfw.38(t) turrets were supplied from Germany and installed in the Aegean coast defenses. In 09–11.1944 the coastal artillery units along the Aegean retired along with their guns into Bulgaria along the Bulgarian troops. Their guns were distributed to the existing defenses alongside the gulfs of Varna and Burgas on the Black sea. The coastal artillery was also using searchlights - it is known that 2 110mm searchlights were delivered along with the 17 cm SK L/40 guns and 3 150mm searchlights were used on the Black sea coast as well

=== Anti-tank guns ===
The Bulgarian army did not have any Anti-tank guns by 1939, only the 20mm Solothurn anti-tank rifles.

- 3.7 cm PaK 36 (Germany) - 100 (some sources claim 99) delivered in 1940.
- 3,7cm KPÚV vz. 37 (Czechoslovakia) - 450 delivered in 1942
- 5 cm Pak 38 (Germany) - 404 supplied under the Barbara supply programme from 1942 until 02.1944.
- 7.5 cm Pak 97/38 (France) - 100 supplied under the Barbara supply programme in 1943
- 7.5 cm PaK 40 (Germany) - 240 were to be supplied under the Barbara supply programme in 1943–1944, 180 have arrived in Bulgaria by 06.1944, some sources claim the deliveries reached 220 by the time Bulgaria switched sides

Thus the available Ant-tank guns in 08.1944 were 220 75mm PaK 40, 100 75mm Pak 97/38, 404 50mm Pak 38, 450 37mm Skoda and 100 37mm PaK 36. On 01.01.1945 the respective availability was 203 75mm PaK 40, 100 75mm Pak 97/38, 362 50mm Pak 38, 279 37mm Skoda and 90 37mm PaK 36. The Soviet Union delivered in mid-1945 90 45 mm anti-tank gun M1942 (M-42)

=== Vehicle, Aircraft and Ship guns ===
==== Vehicle guns ====
- 2 cm KwK 30 (Germany) - 12 on the Sd.Kfz.222
- 3,7cm UV vz. 34(Skoda A-3) (Czechoslovakia) - 26 on the first batch of Panzer 35(t)
- 3,7cm UV vz. 38(Skoda A-7) (Czechoslovakia) - 10 on the second batch of the Panzer 35(t) 10 on the Panzer 38(t)
- Puteaux SA 18 (France) - 40 on the Renault R-35 and 19(?) on the Hotchkiss H39
- 47 mm QFSA (Great Britain) - 8 on the Vickers Mk E
- 7.5 cm KwK 40 (Germany) - 88 on the Panzer IV
- StuK 40 L/48 (Germany) - 50 on the Sturmgeschütz IIIG

==== Ship guns ====
- Canon de 65 mm Modèle 1891 (France) - 2 of these former Bulgarian torpedo gunboat Nadezhda guns were mounted on the training vessel Asen in 1931–1945.
- QF 3-pounder Hotchkiss (France) - 2 of these 47 mm guns on each of the Drazki class patrol boats before 1937 and after 1942.
- 3.7 cm SK C/30 (Germany) - 2 of these 37 mm guns on each of the Drazki class patrol boats in 1937–1942. 1 of these 37 mm guns on each of the SC-1-class submarine chaser from 1941
- 2cm Flak 30/38 (Germany) - 1 of these 20 mm guns on each of the SC-1-class submarine chaser from 1941 2 "Oerlikons" on the training vessel Asen in 1942–1945. 1 "Rheinmetall" on each of the three Lürssen torpedo boats
- Hispano-Suiza HS.804 - 2 of these 20 mm guns on each of the 4 TM Power Motor Torpedo Boats in 1942–1944.

==== Aircraft guns ====
- MG FF cannon (Germany) - 38 on 19 Messerschmitt Bf 109EE 2 on the DAR 10F 1 on the Heinkel He 111H-16. 24 on the 12 Arado Ar 196
- MG 151 cannon (Germany) - at least 145 on the Messerschmitt Bf 109G. 2 on each of the ? Junkers Ju 87Ds
- Hispano-Suiza HS.404 (France) - 98 or 100 of these 20 mm guns on each of the Dewoitine D.520

== Anti-tank weapons (besides anti-tank guns) ==
- Solothurn S-18/100 (Switzerland) - 308 of this 20 mm ATR were ordered and delivered in 1936-1938 (160 - 1936, 88 - 1937, 60 - 1938)
- Panzerbüchse (Germany) - 300 (some sources claim 150 only) Granatbüchse Modell 39 (GrB 39) supplied from Germany under the Barbara supply programme in 1943-1944
- Panzerschreck (Germany) - used in 1944–1945. Supply data not found.
- Panzerfaust (Germany) - used in 1944–1945. Supply data not found.

On 01.12.1939 the Bulgarian army had 308 anti-tank rifles (all Solothurns). That number increased to 263 PzB 39 and 302 Solothurns on 01.01.1944, 308 PzB 39 and 276 Solothurns in 08.1944. 260 and 240 respectively were available on 01.01.1945. 293 and 203 on 01.01.1946. In 1945 Soviet deliveries included 300 PTRS-41 and PTRD-41 during the war and further deliveries increased the Soviet ATR in the Bulgarian army to 424 by 01.01.1946

== Anti-aircraft weapons ==
By 1935 Bulgaria had only 5 anti-air guns, leftovers from the World War I - 3 8.8 cm Flak 16 and 2 7,5 cm Räder B.A.K. These were retained and used during the war for additional air defense of the military factories at Sopot and Kazanlak equipped with an additional optical rangefinder (kommandohilfsgeraet Zeiß).

=== Light anti-aircraft guns ===
- 2cm Flak 30/38 (Germany) - 250 ordered from Rheinmetall-Borsig in 1936 and arrived in 1937–1938. 162 more are ordered from Rheinmetall-Borsig in 1938 and arrived in 1940, but were not yet shown in the army inventory as of 01.12.1939 - 250 available. The modifications listed of these 412 guns were 250 Flak 30 (horse traction), 16 Flak 38 (horse traction), 24 Solothurn ST-5 (motor traction), 72 Flak 38 (motor traction), 50 Oerlikon 20 mm cannon (fixed mounts). 12 Flak 38 (motor traction) and 24 Flak 38 (fixed mounts) were planned under the Barbara supply programme from Germany and delivered in 1944, however there is alternative data for supply in 1944 of a total of 88 20mm Flak 38, bringing the total 2 cm Flak 30/38 deliveries to 500. Each Infantry or Cavalry Division in the Bulgarian army was supposed to have a battery of 15 (5 platoons by 3) of these guns.
- 3.7 cm Flak 36 (Germany) - 9 were delivered under the Barbara supply programme in 1943 and were used exclusively in the anti-air unit of the Bulgarian Armored Brigade
- 37 mm automatic air defense gun M1939 (61-K) - 153 were delivered by the Soviet Union in 05.1945

=== Heavy anti-aircraft guns ===
- 7.5 cm Flak L/59 (Germany) - 20 (motor traction) were supplied in 1941 with 5 fire command units (rangefinders) Wikog ("Kommandogerät „Wikog” 9 SH") by Rheinmetall-Borsig. In 1945 12 of these guns formed the Heavy AA Unit of the 1st Bulgarian Army fighting within 3rd Ukrainian Front of the Soviet Army.
- 8 cm PL kanon vz. 37 (Czechoslovakia) - 16 were supplied in 1941, 7 more in 1943 and 12 more (last batch are former Yugoslav army) in 1944. All were motor traction ones and in addition 5 Škoda T7 vz.37 anti-aircraft central target finders and 6 Škoda vz.25 letoměr (Tepas) were supplied. 12 were listed with the 22nd infantry division of the 1st Occupation Corps on 01.08.1944 and were captured by the Axis forces in the beginning of September 1944 during the retreat and the disarming of the Corps.
- 8.8 cm Flak 18/36/37/41 (Germany) - 20 8.8 cm Flak 18 (motor traction - Sonderanhänger 201 (Sd. Ah. 201)) were ordered in 1936 from Krupp in Germany and supplied in 1937 with 5 fire command units Pschorr (Kommandogerät „Pschorr” 27). Further 66 8.8 cm Flak 36 (motor traction - Sonderanhänger 202 (Sd. Ah. 202)) were supplied in 1943 along with 14 Fire Control Units Kommandogerät 40 and 14 Kommandohilfsgerät 35 and then a next batch of 50 (positional - fixed mounts) 8.8 cm Flak 37 in the beginning of 1944. These guns formed the backbone of the Anti-Air Defense of the Bulgarian capital of Sofia during the 1943-1944 Allied bombing raids. Another 76 8.8 cm Flak 37 (positional - fixed mounts) were delivered in 1944, but have not reached the air defense and army units before Bulgaria switched sides in 09.1944.

Three sources and claim that 76 mm air defense gun M1931 were used from 1946 in the Bulgarian army, but no data for supply of such guns can be found, as after the war Soviet Union was supplying 37 mm and 85 mm guns. One theory is that these are 12 captured guns, used during the war by the German forces to defend its facilities in Varna on the Black Sea Coast, which were then abandoned during the retreat from Bulgaria.

=== Searchlights ===
- 150 cm Flakscheinwerfer 34 (Germany) - 6 were ordered in 1936 (motor traction), from Siemens-Schuckert and delivered in 1937.
- 150 cm Flakscheinwerfer 37 (Germany) - 75 delivered in 1943 and 39 in 1944. The first batch were motor traction, the second batch - positional (fixed).
- 60 cm Flakscheinwerfer 36 (Germany) - 12 delivered in 1943

=== RangeFinders ===
- Entfernungsmesser 34 (EM34) 0.7M rangefinder (Germany)- 110 available in 1944
- Entfernungsmesser 36 (EM36) 1M rangefinders (Germany) - 13 available in 1944

== Vehicles ==
=== Tankettes ===
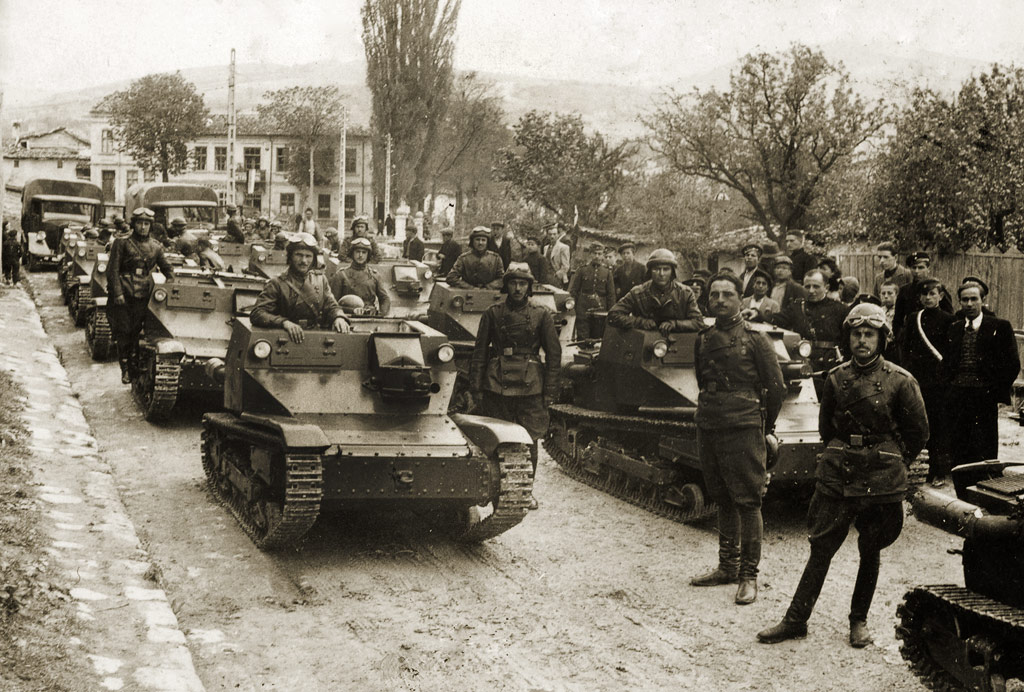
Tankettes in the 1930s

- L3/33 (Italy) - 14 were ordered in 1934 from Italy and were supplied in 1935. On Bulgarian insistence these were armed with 1 8mm Schwarzlose machine gun. Bulgarian designation is "Ансалдо-Фиат" or "Ансалдо". Scrapped in 1945

=== Tanks ===
- Vickers Mk E (Great Britain) - 8 (Mod. B) were purchased in 1936 and received in 1938 with 1 47mm OQF 3-pounder gun, but without the 1 7.92mm Vickers machine gun each. 1 8mm Maxim heavy machine gun was installed instead after their delivery in Bulgaria. Bulgarian designation is "Викерс". Scrapped in 1945
- Panzer 35(t) (Czechoslovakia) - 26 ordered in 1939 from Germany from the former Czechoslovak army stocks and delivered in February–April 1940 (armament is 1 37.2mm A-3 gun and 2 7.92mm ZB vz.37). 10 more with 37.2mm A-7 gun are bought also in 06.1940 (former Afghanistan army order) and arrive in October 1940-January 1941. 12 were lost in 1944 fighting. Bulgarian designation is "Шкода". Scrapped in 1958
- Panzer 38(t) (Czechoslovakia) - 10 supplied in 05.1943 (instead of 10 planned Panzer III). 6 were lost in 1944 fighting. Bulgarian designation is "Прага". Scrapped in 1958
- Hotchkiss H39 (France) - 19 supplied in 03.1944. Initially 25 Panzer I were supposed to be delivered for training in 1943, but German army informed Bulgaria that instead they can deliver 19 Hotchkiss H39 and 6 Somua S35. The Bulgarian army refused the supply of these French tanks, but in 1944 the newly formed Bulgarian Gendermerie (reporting to the Interior Ministry at that time) accepted the Hotchkiss H39, although there is no evidence of their use. After the disbandment of the Gendermerie, these tanks were returned to the army and were scrapped. Scrapped in 1948
- Renault R35 (France) - 40 purchased from Germany in 1941. Bulgarian designation is "Рено" Scrapped in 1945
- Panzer IVG and Panzer IVH (Germany) - 91 were supposed to be delivered for the Bulgarian Armoured Brigade under the Barbara Supply Programme for 1943. In 04.1943-02.1944 a total of 88 tanks (50 are known to be H, 11 G and the rest can not be identified in the documents) were delivered to Bulgaria and 3 were left at the German training school at Nish (and subsequently captured by the Germans in 09.1944). 43 were lost in the 1944 fighting. In the beginning of 1945 when the Bulgarians formed their 1st army to fight within the 3rd Ukrainian front they included an armored battalion of 22 Panzer IV, 2 Sd. Kfz. 222 and 1 Sd. Kfz. 223. 11 more tanks were lost in the 1945 fighting. From March 1945 to the end of the year a total of 51 Panzer IV were received as trophies from the 3rd Ukrainian front (mostly IVJ) Bulgarian designation is Майбах Т-IV. Scrapped in 1958
- T-34-85 (Soviet Union) - the first tanks arrived in late 1945. By 1950 466 were supplied

In 1945 the following tanks were delivered from the Soviet Union to Bulgaria as trophies: 14 Panzer V, 51 Panzer IV, 3 Panzer III, 1 Turan I. 6 more Panzer V were delivered in 1946. All except Panzer IV and Panzer III were scrapped by 1948

=== Self-propelled guns ===
- Sturmgeschütz III (Germany) - In 04.1943-12.1943 55 Sturmgeschütz 40G are delivered, forming 2 assault gun battalions for 1st and 2nd Bulgarian armies respectively (each with 25 StuGs, with 5 left in the German training school in Nish and then lost in 09.1944, when Bulgaria switched sides). 6 were lost in 1944 fighting (but only 1 irreparably). Bulgarian designation is Майбах Т-3. Scrapped in 1958

In 03.1945 the Soviet 3rd Ukrainian front delivered to the 1st Bulgarian army directly the following trophies: 3 Sturmgeschütz III, 2 Sturmgeschütz IV, 4 Hetzer, 2 40M Nimrod, 2 Semovente 47/32. These formed a separate assault guns battery (the 9 StuGs and Hetzers) and a recon platoon (the Italian and Hungarian vehicles) to the 1st army tank battalion. In addition the Bulgarians captured 1 abandoned Jagdpanzer IV in April 1945.

In 1945 in total Bulgaria received from the Soviet union the following self-propelled guns: 9 Sturmgeschütz III, 1 StuH, 2 Sturmgeschütz IV, 3 Jagdpanzer IV, 6 Panzer IV/70, 5 Hetzer, 3 Hummel, 2 40M Nimrod, 2 Semovente 47/32. 1 Wespe arrived in 1946. All were scrapped in 1946–1948, except for the Sturmgeschütz IV, Panzer IV/70 and Jagdpanzer IV, which were scrapped in 1958. The first Soviet SU-76 arrived in 1946 - by 1950, 156 were supplied.

=== Armored cars ===
- Leichter Panzerspähwagen (Germany) - 20 delivered in 05.-06.1943 for the Reconnaissance battalion of the Armoured Brigade (12 Sd.Kfz.222 + 8 Sd.Kfz.223). 4 vehicles were irreparably lost in the 1944 fighting. Two M222 and one M223 were included as platoon in 01.1945 in the armored battalion attached to the Bulgarian 1st army participating in the war within 3rd Ukrainian front. Bulgarian designation is Хорх М222 и М223. Remaining armored cars were scrapped in 1958

In 1945 a limited number of armoured cars is received from the Soviet Union trophies - 1 Sd. Kfz. 260/261, 1 Sd.Kfz. 251 and 1 AB-41. In the first post WW2 years a total of 21 BA-64B were supplied.

=== Command and reconnaissance ===
In 06.1940 there were 134 two-axle command and reconnaissance cars. In 10.1941 there were 32 three-axle and 151 two-axle command and reconnaissance cars in the Bulgarian army and 4 three-axle and 1 two-axle command and reconnaissance cars in the Bulgarian Navy. In 10.1943 there were 10 three-axle reconnaissance cars and 2 rescue three-axle cars Tatra in the Bulgarian Air Force. In 05.1944 there were 40 three-axle and 600 two-axle reconnaissance cars in the Bulgarian army

- Fiat 508 "Spider" recon car (Italy) - 20 supplied in 1934. Used as command and recon vehicle.
- Phänomen Granit 30 reconnaissance car (Germany) - 62 ordered in 1936. Used by the motorized infantry formations.
- Tatra 72 (Czechoslovakia) - 2 ordered in 1936. Used by the Bulgarian Air Force for Rescue operations.
- Tempo G1200 (Germany) - 5 ordered in 1936. Used as training reconnaissance cars in the Automobile school. Additional ? were ordered in 1941.
- Praga AV (Czechoslovakia) - 10 supplied in 1939 for the Bulgarian Air Force. One was used personally by Boris III as a staff car.
- BMW 325 (Germany) - 50 were ordered in 1940 and delivered in 1940–41. Used by the Heavy Artillery Regiments and 8 in the Armoured Regiment
- Horch 901 (Germany) - 4 delivered in 1940. Several more were supplied in the following years. Used by the Armies HQ
- Stoewer R200 Spezial Typ 40 (Germany) - the initial order for 10 was placed in 1941, then after the successful trials as a reconnaissance car additional 115 units were bought in 1941 and delivered in 1942-1943 40 radio cars Kfz. 15 based on Steyr 1500A have been ordered in 1943 and ? delivered in 1943–1944. The Kfz. 15 were used by the Communication battalions
- Steyr 1500A (Germany) - ? ordered and supplied in 1942–44.
- Volkswagen Kübelwagen (Germany) - 124 Kfz. 1 delivered in 1943, ? more in 1944. Known in Bulgarian army as KDF. Widely used - anti-tank detachments, bridge battalions, assault gun detachments, the armored brigade and one car in the headquarters of each infantry regiment
- Mercedes-Benz 170VK (Germany) - 98 delivered in 1943 and ? in 1944. Used in the armies, corps, divisions and brigades headquarters and in the artillery and engineer regiments.
- Skoda Superb 3000 type 952 (Czechoslovakia) - 5 radio cars Kfz. 15 based on this automobile were delivered in 11.1943 and were used in the motorized units of the Armoured Brigade.

21 command and reconnaissance cars were lost in 09.1944 during the retreat from Macedonia and Serbia 1395 cars (incl. passenger, training, etc.) were available in 10.1944 - 1041 participated in the war against Germany., 64 two-axle command and reconnaissance cars were lost. 439 light and reconnaissance cars were available in 03.1945 with the 1st Bulgarian army fighting within the 3rd Ukrainian front 6 were lost in 1945 236 two-axle command and reconnaissance cars have been captured as trophies by the Bulgarian army by 15 September 1945.

=== Trucks ===
In 06.1938 the Bulgarian army had 405 three-axle (Steyr, Morris, Tatra) and 547 two-axle trucks. In 06.1940 the Bulgarian army had 807 three-axle and 532 two-axle trucks, 8 fuel tankers, 18 radio vehicles, 3 mobile workshops. In 10.1941 the Bulgarian army had 784 three-axle trucks, 1653 two-axle trucks, 15 fuel tankers, 3 bakery trucks, 34 radio trucks, 1 sanitary bus, 19 mobile workshops, 13 special purpose vehicles and 12 passenger buses. At the same trime the Bulgarian air force had 36 three-axle trucks, 164 two-axle trucks, 40 fuel tankers, 8 photo laboratory trucks, 8 radio trucks, 61 mobile workshops, 4 special purpose vehicles. In 10.1943 the Bulgarian Air Force had 154 two-axle trucks, 24 three axle trucks, 19 buses, 6 workshop trucks, 40 petrol cisterns, 2 photo laboratory cars, 4 fire cars. In 05.1944 there were 800 three axle trucks, 3500 military trucks, 1200 mobilized civil trucks, 60 petrol cisterns, 5 fire trucks, 47 workshops, 50 military buses, 343 mobilized civil passenger buses in the Bulgarian army

- Renault 10 CV type MH (France) - 25 bought in 1926. Used by the Engineers units.
- Morris Commercial D Type (Great Britain) - 15 bought in the Interwar period. Used in the artillery.
- Citroen 5 (France) - 56 bought in 1932. Used by the engineers.
- Ford AA (USA) - ? bought in the 1930s.
- Ford BB (USA) - ? bought in 1931
- Dodge ME31 (USA) - ? bought in the 1930s
- Chrysler Fargo CF33 (USA) - ? bought in the 1930s
- Krupp L2H42 (Germany) - 120 chassis bought in 1934 and received in 1935. The bodies for these chassis are manufactured in Bulgaria.
- Raba V 5 ton (Hungary) - 19 bought in 1934. Used to carry the L3/33 and a few were converted into mobile workshops
- Mercedes-Benz L3000 fuel tanker (Germany) - diesel trucks supplied in 1935. One was a fuel tanker. Additional ? supplied in 1943
- Mercedes-Benz Lo 2000 (Germany) - 316 supplied in 1936-1937 Additional 20 were supplied with Lorentz radio equipment as radio trucks in 1937.
- Steyr 440 (Austria, Germany) - 333 ordered in 1936. Used by the motorized infantry formations and in the artillery units. 388 listed in 06.1938
- Steyr 640 (Austria, Germany) - 400 ordered in 1940 and delivered in 1940/41. 20 more ordered in 1941 Used also as prime movers for 2 cm FlaK, 3.7 cm, 3.72 cm, 5 cm PaK 38 and 7.5 cm PaK 97/38.
- Praga V2 (Czechoslovakia) - 5 supplied in 1939 for the air-force.
- Wikov 10.4 (Czechoslovakia) - 5 supplied in 1939 for the air-force.
- Opel Blitz 3600 (Germany) - 300 chassis supplied in 1939. The bodies for these chassis are manufactured in Bulgaria. Another 238 chassis were ordered in 05.1940 and supplied until the end of 1940, including 18 with Hahn&Kolb Stuttgart mobile workshop body and 30 3200 litres Ref-Weygandt&Klein fuel tankers (for the Air Force - received in 02–03.1941) 600 more ordered and delivered in 1941 - again only chassis and the bodies were manufactured in Bulgaria. 10 additional were ordered and delivered in 1941 as fuel tankers (3200 liters). 40 additional Hahn&Kolb Stuttgart mobile workshops installed on Opel Blitz 3600 were also ordered in 1941 and supplied (16 in 1941, 12 in 1942 and 12 in 1943). Another order of 760 cargo chassis plus 22 3200 litre tankers was made in 08.1941, but these were supplied only in 1943. In total 1930 Opel Blitz 3.6-36 chassis were delivered in 1939-1944 and were used in all units of the Army, Air Force and Navy
- MAN SML (Germany) - 200 Mercedes-Benz L4500S were initially ordered in 10.1941, but the order was cancelled from German side, then transformed into a contract for 200 MAN SML supplied. The quantity supplied is not known, but these were used in the Armoured Brigade and in the Bridge Battalions of the Engineers
- Mercedes-Benz L 4500 (Germany) - 10 ordered in 08.1942 and received in 10.1942. Used by the motorized bridge battalions.^{2015}
- Henschel 33 D1 Kfz. 72 (Germany) - 32 3-axle were ordered in 11.1942 and received in 07.1943. Used as tractors for type B motorised bridges in the motorized bridge engineer battalions.
- Büssing-NAG 4500 S (Germany) - 30 ordered in 11.1942 and received in mid-1943
- MAN E3000 - ? supplied in 194?
- Renault AHN (France) - 1105 AHN-1 were supposed to be delivered under the Barbara supply programme in 1943–1944, 917 were delivered until 01.06.1944
- Peugeot DMA (France) - ? supplied in ?
- Krupp Protze (Germany) - never supplied to Bulgaria, ? captured in 1944-1945

In 09.1944 158 trucks were lost during the retreat from Serbia and Macedonia. Another 345 were captured as trophies from the Soviet army in Bulgaria when Soviet forces moved into Bulgaria and were not returned. In 10.1944 there were 2669 trucks available with the Bulgarian army. 2061 participated in the war against Germany in 1944, 395 were lost. 1433 trucks were available in 03.1945 with the 1st Bulgarian army fighting within the 3rd Ukrainian front, 14 were lost 368 trucks have been captured as trophies by the Bulgarian army by 15 September 1945

=== Passenger cars ===
In 06.1938 there were 253 passenger cars in the Bulgarian army In 06.1940 there were 245 passenger cars in the Bulgarian army In 10.1941 there were 266 passenger cars in the Bulgarian Army and 25 in the Bulgarian Air Force In 10.1943 there were 24 passenger cars in the Bulgarian Air Force. In 05.1944 there were 500 military and 500 mobilized civil cars in the Bulgarian army

- Opel P4 (Germany) - 100 ordered in 1936 as driver training cars. 198 listed as available in 06.1938
- Mercedes-Benz 170 V (Germany) - 15 delivered in 04.1943, 15 in 06.1943, 15 in 07.1943, 14 in 08.1943, 14 in 11.1943, 17 in 12.1943
- Simca (France) - 17 delivered in 04.1943
- Opel Kadett (Germany) - ? delivered
- Ford V8 (USA) - ? used as mobilised civilian vehicles
- Wanderer W 23 (Germany) - ? used
- Tatra 57 (Czechoslovakia) - ? used

19 training and passenger cars were lost in 09.1944 during the retreat from Macedonia and Serbia Another 107 were captured as trophies by the Soviet army in early September during its occupation of Bulgaria and never returned A total of 1395 cars(incl. command and reconnaissance) were available in 10.1944 - 1041 participated in the war against Germany. 63 light passenger cars were lost in October to December 1944. By 15 September 1945 441 light passenger cars were captured as trophies by the Bulgarian army.

=== Ambulances ===
In 06.1938 there were 160 ambulances in the Bulgarian army In 06.1940 there were 258 ambulances in the Bulgarian army In 10.1941 there were 263 ambulances in the Bulgarian army and 27 in the Bulgarian Air Force In 05.1944 there were 331 military ambulances and 41 mobilized civil ambulances in the Bulgarian army, as well as 1 surgical bus and 4 X-ray buses

- Phänomen Granit 25 (Germany) - 160 supplied in 1936 as ambulances. Used in the motorized sanitary platoons in the divisions. 130 more supplied in 1940-1941
- Phänomen Granit 1500 S (Germany) - 40 supplied in 1943

8 ambulances were lost in 09.1944 during the retreat from Macedonia and Serbia Another 62 were captured as trophies by the Soviet army during the brief occupation of northeastern Bulgaria and were never returned. There were 491 ambulances available in 10.1944 with the Bulgarian army - 420 participated in the war against Germany, 52 were lost 275 ambulances were available in 03.1945 with the 1st Bulgarian army fighting within the 3rd Ukrainian front, 1 was lost 40 ambulances have been captured as trophies by the Bulgarian army by 15.09.1945

=== Motorcycles ===
In 06.1938 there were 156 motorcycles in the Bulgarian army. In 06.1940 there were 135 motorcycles in the Bulgarian army In 10.1941 there were 97 motorcycles without sidecar and 152 motorcycles with a sidecar in the Bulgarian army and 7 motorcycles without sidecar and 44 with sidecar in the Bulgarian Air Force

- BSA motorcycles (Great Britain) - 3 bought in ?
- Motosacoche (Switzerland) - 13 bought in 1930
- NSU (Germany) - 12 bought in 1933
- Ardie TM500 (Germany) - 13 bought in ?
- Praga BD (Czechoslovakia) - 50 bought in 1933
- BMW R12 (Germany) - 57 with sidecars bought in 1936. Used as courier vehicle.
- BMW R61 (Germany) - 76 ordered in 02.1942 and received in 09.1942
- BMW R71S (Germany) - 30 BMW 71 with sidecars bought and received in 1940. Further 150 with sidecars were bought and received in 02.1941. Another order for 24 again with sidecars were ordered in 02.1942 and received in 09.1942
- BMW R75 (Germany) - 200 BMW R75 with sidecars were ordered in 08.1941 and were delivered in 1943. 400 were delivered in total until 1944.
- DKW NZ350 (Germany) - 500 ordered in 1941 and received in 1942. Another 415 ordered and received in 1942. ? more delivered in 1943-44
- NSU 251 OSL - 490 supplied in 1943-1944

172 motorcycles were lost in 09.1944 during the retreat from Serbia and Macedonia. Another 243 were captured as trophies by the Soviet army during the brief occupation of the northeastern part of Bulgaria in 09.1944 and were never returned. There were 1758 motorcycles available in 11.1944 with the Bulgarian army - 1485 participated in the war against Germany, 292 were lost 673 motorcycles were available in 03.1945 with the 1st Bulgarian army fighting within the 3rd Ukrainian front, 21 were lost 350 motorcycles have been captured as trophies by the Bulgarian army by 15.09.1945

=== Tractors & prime movers ===
In 06.1938 there were 59 artillery tractors in the Bulgarian army

- Pavesi P4 (Italy) - 36 P.C.26 bought in 1930. 20 more P.C.30 in 1934. 50 P.C. 30A were supplied in 1938. Used in the heavy artillery regiments on Army level, the Artillery school and the heavy anti-air units

Later additions included:

- Allice Chalmers WKO (USA) - ? bought in 1938. Used by the engineers.
- McCormick M.I.12, M.I.14, M.I.30, M.I.35 (USA/Great Britain) - ? bought in 1938. Used by the engineers.
- The Einheits-Diesel Trucks (Germany) - 160 MAN produced G-2 type (2.5t, 6x6) were supplied in 1940 and were used for towing 10.5 cm Rheinmetall D/30 howitzers and 7.5 cm D/59 Rheinmetall anti-air guns.
- TL.37 (Italy) - 20 ordered in 03.1939 and received in 01.1940
- Breda 32 (Italy) - 20 ordered in 03.1939 and received in 10.1940. Used for 8.8 cm FlaK.
- Sd.Kfz. 6 (Germany) - 72 Bussing-NAG BN9 tractors were ordered in 09.1939. Received in 02–10.1941. Used in the heavy artillery regiments and in the artillery unit of the armoured brigade.
- Deutz-Fahr F3M.317 (Germany) - 23 of these diesel tractors were ordered for the Bulgarian Air force in 1940 and delivered in 1941. 3 more were ordered in 02.1941 and received in 09.1941, again for the Air Force

In 10.1941 there were 381 artillery tractors in the Bulgarian army and 35 in the Bulgarian air force. In 10.1943 there were 12 tractors in the Bulgarian Air Force In 05.1944 there were 830 tractors in the Bulgarian army

- FAMO Rubezahl (Germany) - 2 tractors were delivered in 10.1942. Used by the engineers.
- Sd.Kfz. 7 (Germany) - 24 supplied in 06.1943 and used as artillery tractors for the supplied 122mm Soviet trophy guns. 6 supplied in 1944 and used in the Armored Brigade as tractors for the 8.8 cm FlaK
- Horch 108 (Germany) - 12 supplied in 1943. Used in the Armoured brigade as tractors for 2 cm Flak 38.
- Ford V3000s/SSM Maultier (Germany) - 384 Sd.Kfz.3b were supplied under the Barbara supply programme from Germany in 1943–1944. These were used to tow the 7.5 cm PAKs in the anti-armor battalions and 3.7 cm FlaK 36 in the Armored Brigade, as well as 2 cm Flak 38.
- Steyr RSO (Germany) - 40 delivered in 02.1943 (120 were planned). Used in the motorized artillery units as tractors for 10.5 cm LeFH and as cargo vehicles.
- Faun ZR (Germany) - ? supplied in 1943 and used in the anti-air artillery units (8.8 cm FlaK).
- Sd.Kfz. 9 (Germany) - 2 FAMO F3 tractors with Sd.Ah.116 flatbed trailers were supplied in 1943. Used by the two StuG III assault guns battalions for transportation of damaged StuGs.
- Hanomag (Germany) - ? supplied in ?

59 tractors were lost in 09.1944 during the retreat from Macedonia and Serbia Another 20 were captured in 09.1944 by the Soviet army during the inavasion and occupation of northeastern Bulgaria. In 10.1944 there were 612 tractors with the Bulgarian army - 532 participated in the war against Germany in 1944, 78 were lost. 272 tractors were available in 03.1945 with the 1st Bulgarian army fighting within the 3rd Ukrainian front, 7 were lost 4 tractors have been captured as trophies by the Bulgarian army by 15.09.1945 - 1 Sd.Kfz. 9, 1 Sd.Kfz. 8, 1 Renault UE etc.

=== Miscellaneous vehicles ===
- Krupp ODH 232 Bus - 1 supplied in 1934
- Fargo Bus - ? delivered in ?
- Opel Blitz Bus - 12 supplied in 09.1943. 18 in total received by 06.1944
- Kfz. 17 - 44 radio vehicles delivered in 1943-1944

== Navy ships and war vessels ==
The Treaty of Neuilly-sur-Seine of 1919 restricted the already insignificant Bulgarian Navy to 4 torpedo boats (without torpedoes) and 6 patrol boats for police and protection of fisheries needs. The ships could not be over 100t, and should be only lightly armed. Submarines and naval aviation were prohibited. Thus in 1920 the Navy was transformed into a Sea Trade Police Service and River Trade Police Service, both under the Ministry of Trade, Industry and Labour. The Sea Police Service was based in Varna and had:

- 3, later 4 of 97-ton Drazki-class torpedo boats (France) - "Drazki, "Hrabri", "Strogi" and from 1924 "Smeli" (taken out of seabed and repaired). The original 6 torpedo boats (armament 2 47 mm guns, 3 450 mm torpedo tubes, 26 knots) dated from the early 20th century and formed the mainstay of the Bulgarian Navy during the Balkan wars and World War I. In 1916 "Shumni" was lost to a Russian mine. After the war the French confiscated the remaining boats and "Letyashti" and "Smeli" were wrecked by them in the Black sea. In 1920 the remaining boats were returned to Bulgaria, but the torpedo tubes were removed. In 1923-1924 the ships got minesweeper equipment and were employed as minesweepers. In 1924 the torpedo tubes of the sunk "Letyashti" were taken out of the sea and secret retraining of the crew for use of torpedoes began anew. In 1934-1937 the 4 torpedo boats underwent modernization - the torpedo tubes were mounted again and the artillery changed to 2 semi-automatic 3.7 cm SK C/30 Rheinmetall guns, 2 MG 08 machine-guns were added as air defense weapons(until 1942 when the original 47mm QF 3-pounder Hotchkiss guns were returned and as air defense weapons MG-34 were mounted on the boats, instead of the old MG 08 plus a deep charges rack and а 70-cm rangefinder). "Drazki" was damaged in an explosion in Varna on 15.10.1942. "Smeli" capsized on 19.05.1943 while transferring from Burgas to Varna. During the World War II the old torpedo-boats were used in convoy defense and coastal patrols.
- Kamchiya (Russia) - Former 19th century steamer, acquired in 1906 as a Royal Yacht, converted in 1912 as a minesweeper (105t, 11 knots, 12 mines). At the end of World War I given to the Varna Port Authority, then transferred to the Sea Police Service. Modernized in 1924. In the 30s transferred to Danube as a hydrographic survey ship, then back to Varna again as a hydrographic and training vessel during World War II. During the war it was armed with two small calibre guns and a machine gun.
- Lilija (ship) - Former names - "Heraklea" and "Konduktor Dokuzanov". German built WWI type minesweeper boat, delivered in 1917 (16 tons, 8 knots, 2 MGs). Refitted in 1930. Used until World War II, when it was decommissioned during the war.
- Vyara (ship) and Balik - former names Kapitan-Leytenant Minkov and Minyor. Austrian-built WWI type minesweeper boats, delivered in 1917 (14 tons, 9 knots, 2 MGs). Refitted in 1930. Used in World War II, when Vyara was decommissioned and Balik survived the war.<
- Dobrotich and Momthcil - German built WWI type minesweeper boats, delivered in 1917 (12 tons, 7 knots, 2 MGs). Refitted in 1930. Used in World War II.
- Kalatzerka- German built WWI type minesweeper boat, delivered in 1918 (8 tons, 7 knots, 1 MG). Refitted in 1930. Used until World War II, when it was decommissioned during the war.
- Nessebar (ship) and Emona (ship) - Russia built WWI type minesweeper boats, delivered in 1918 (18 tons, 8 knots, 1 MG). Refitted in 1930. Used in World War II.

In 1921 the Bulgarian government bought from France the following ships:

- SC-1-class submarine chaser (USA)- two of these (former French "Chasseurs" C 27 and C 80, former US SC-314 and SC-385) were acquired without their anti-sub gear and renamed "Belomoretz"and "Chernomoretz". These were initially based in Varna and used as minesweepers, but in 1928 these got transferred to the Danube as patrol boats and were rearmed with 1 47 mm gun and 2 MGs. In 1941 the two ships returned to Varna and were rearmed again as sub chasers with 1 37mm, 1 20mm and depth charges and were used in convoy service.
- Motor Launch (Canada) - four of these ex-French Canadian built motor-launches ("Vedettes") were acquired and renamed "Minyor", "Vzriv", "Kapitan Minkov" and "Konduktor Dokuzanov". In 1921-1924 these were used as minesweepers at Varna, then three were transferred to Danube river in 1925-1928 as patrol ships (armed with 2 MGs each). By 1934 two of the ships ("Minyor" and "Konduktor Dokuzanov") were wrecked and decommissioned and used as spare parts and only "Vzriv" and "Kapitan Minkov" participated as patrol and minewsweeper ships on the Danube in World War II.

The Navy in the interwar period also had some auxiliary ships, like:

- Asen (Russia) - sail training vessel. Former Russian/Soviet schooner Utrish. Arrived in Varna in 1925 with immigrants from Russia and confiscated by the Bulgarian government. Transferred to the Navy in 1931 as a training ship and received 2 65 mm guns (former Bulgarian torpedo gunboat Nadezhda guns). In 1936 also received the diesel engine "Bolinder" taken from the sunken U-boat UB-45. In 1942 also received 2 20mm Oerlikon guns. It had a displacement of 240 tons, speed of 7 knots, a crew of 14 and 30 trainees. Survived the World War II as a training ship (and in 1944-45 as a base ship for the minesweeper boats).
- On the Black Sea - the small sail training vessel Strela (built 1886, 28 tons, used as a training vessel until 1941) and the steam boat Kaliakria (built 1898, 60 tons, 7 knots, used as a base for the Navy Divers Command until the late 30s)
- On the Danube - a dozen small unarmed patrol boats.

In 1938 with the official lifting of the Neuilly treaty restrictions, Bulgaria begun to slowly modernize its navy. It acquired:

- E-boat (Germany)- in 1938 a contract for 5 modified German S2 boats was concluded with the Lürssen. The torpedo boats had a displacement of 63 tons, speed of 34 knots, crew of 19-23 men and armament of 2 torpedo tubes, 1 20 mm Rheinmetal gun and 2 MG-34, 8 depth charges, 4 mines and minesweeper equipment each. Two boats were delivered to Varna in April and July 1939 (No 1 and No 2 respectively). No 3 was confiscated temporarily by Germany at the outbreak of World War II, received more powerful engines (speed 37 knots) and was returned to Bulgaria only in July 1941. The remaining two boats were never built. The three torpedo boats were captured by the Soviet Navy in 09.1944, but were returned to Bulgaria in 04.1945
- Motor torpedo boat (Netherlands) - instead of the remaining undelivered Lürssen Germany offered in 1942 to deliver 4 captured Dutch TM torpedo boats (38 tons, 40 knots, 14 men, 2 x 20 mm HS804 guns, 2 - 533mm torpedo tubes, 8 Depth Charges). Eventually TM-52, TM-53, TM-68 and TM-69 were delivered by the end of 1942 and renamed No4 to No7 in the Bulgarian Navy. In 09.1944 these were captured as trophies by the Soviet Navy, but later No 4 and No 5 were returned to Bulgaria.

In 1939 Bulgaria also ordered three small U-boat from Germany (413tons, 16/8.5 knots, 5 533mm torpedo tubes) and even paid them in advance in 1942, but never received these.

Bulgaria was also capable of building small boats and the Navy received in the 1940s:

- MCK minesweepers (Bulgaria) - called Project 501 and МЧК (миночистачен катер) - Minesweeper boats designed after the small boat "Vyara" gifted to Boris III from Italy in 1934. These had a displacement of 25 tons, 8 men, 10 knots, 1 Mg-34, minesweeping equipment. 6 were built until 09.1944, No 1 was lost in fire in 1944, 4 more until 07.1945 and 3 more after 1945. No 2 to No 6 were taken as trophies by the Soviet Navy, but returned to Bulgaria in 08.1945.
- Maritza class minesweepers (Bulgaria) - 4 of these were built in Kavala on the Aegean sea in 1943 and were the biggest ships of the miniature Bulgarian Aegean Fleet in 1941–1944. These had a displacement of 23 tons, speed of 8 knots and an armament of 1 MG-34 and mine sweeping equipment. The names of the minesweepers were "Maritza", "Mesta", "Struma" and "Vardar". Four more were laid down in 1944, but were not finished and in September 1944 all were handed over to the Greek EAM forces.

In 1942-1944 Bulgaria also produced for the Germany the following ships:

- KFK (ship) (Bulgaria/Germany) - 19 (newer source estimates 35 plus another 10 were captured incomplete by the Soviets in 09.1944) were produced in Bulgaria for Germany on the Black Sea.
- Marinefährprahm (Bulgaria/Germany) - 99 (newer source estimates 91) were produced in Bulgaria for Germany on the Black Sea. In late August 1944 F128A, F176A, F405C, F575C2, F571C2M, F851D, F852D, F900D, F904DM and F907DM were transferred to the Bulgarian Navy, but served there only for a few days, as the Soviet Navy acquired these as war booty in September 1944

Also as auxiliary ships, the Bulgarian Navy used:

- Dunav (ship) (Yugoslavia/Bulgaria) - former Yugoslav barges "Vukovar" and "Baya" were acquired in 1941 from Germany and then converted in Varna as minelayers "Dunav" and "Svistov". These barges had a displacement of 544tons, speed of 8 knots and could carry up to 50 mines. Used both on the Danube and in the Black sea as minelayers.
- The Danube flotilla received 2 new boats from the Austrian company DSDG in 1942 - Motor I and Motor II, as well as one boat locally built in Varna - "Inzh. Minchev" which were used as minesweepers
- Granichar (Germany/Yugoslavia) - two ex-Yugoslav German built motor boats were used on the Lake Ochrid by the Bulgarian Navy as patrol boats in 1944. Their Yugoslav names were Strazh and Granichar. These were 30 ton boats, capable of 20 knots and armed with 1 20 mm gun, 1 Heavy Machine Gun and 2 Light Machine Guns.
- FL boat (Germany)- three of these (FL. B404, FL. B425, FL. B584) search and rescue boats were transferred to the Bulgarian Navy in late August 1944, but were captured as trophies by the Soviet Navy in September 1944.
- Vasil Levski (ship)- mobilized river tugs were used as minesweepers on the Danube in 1944–1945. Known vessels include "Vasil Levski", "Hristo Botev", "Tsibar", "Iskar" and "Kiril Popov".

== Aircraft ==
The Treaty of Neuilly-sur-Seine forbade Bulgaria to have a military aviation and what military aviation equipment existed in Bulgaria was almost totally destroyed by the Allies in 1920. Some aircraft and equipment were hidden by the Bulgarian authorities and later reused, and successive Bulgarian governments managed to keep and expand the existing cadre of pilots and technicians by creating a civil aviation and a nascent aviation industry in the 1920s and the beginning of the 1930s, but it is safe to say that by the mid-1930s, Bulgaria had in practice no military aviation. The existing mixture of planes had very little military value and almost no armament (leftover machine guns and bombs from World War I) was present even to arm those.

Bulgaria started to rearm openly in the field of aviation in 1936, although the Neuilly treaty military restrictions were only officially lifted in 1938. Of the countries approached to supply planes, only two actually agreed - Germany and Poland. Thus the Bulgarian aviation in World War II was a mixture of German (and later ex-Czech or ex-French) and Polish planes, supplemented by the local aviation industry, which managed to produce trainers and army cooperation planes.

=== Fighters ===
- Heinkel He 51 biplanes (Germany) - 12 were bought in 1936 and delivered at the end of the year. These were the first real fighter planes in Bulgarian service since World War I. Bulgarian designation - "Сокол" (Falcon). Used as fighters in 1937–1940, then as fighter trainers in 1940–1946, when the last one was scrapped. One was lost in an incident in 04.1939.
- Arado Ar 65 biplanes (Germany) - 12 were gifted by Goering to Boris III in 05.1937. Bulgarian designation - "Орел" (Eagle). Used as fighters in 1937–1939, then in 08.1939 assigned as fighter-trainers. One was lost in an incident, in 1939, the remainder were gradually retired during the war with the last one in 1946.
- PZL P.24B (Poland) - 12 (some sources claim 14, but 12 are delivered) were bought in 1936 and delivered in 1937. Bulgarian designation - "Ястреб" (Kestrel). Used as fighters in 1937–1941, then were relegated as fighter-trainers. One was lost in an incident in 06.1938. The last remaining ones were destroyed in the Allied bombing raids on the Karlovo airfield in 06.1944. There were also negotiations in 1938-1939 for obtaining further P.24s (12 to 26 P-24J?), but the German invasion cancelled this order.
- Avia B-534 (Czechoslovakia) - 60 bought from Germany from its Czech trophies in 1939 and arrived in Bulgaria in 10.1939. 6 more were acquired as spare parts in 1939 (5 were eventually restored to flying condition) and 12 more were ordered and delivered in 1940. Thus 78 planes were bought in total (6 as spare parts) and delivered and 77 served in Bulgaria as fighters in 1939–1943. Bulgarian designation - "Доган" (Hunting Falcon). Several were lost in incidents and by the end of 1941 - 73 were available for duty. During 1943 these were gradually retired as fighters and 56 were eventually deemed fit to be transferred to a ground attack role in the 2 Orlyak (Air Group) of the 2nd Ground Assault Air Regiment. 6 were assigned in 1944 with the 1st Occupation Corps in Serbia at Nis. One was destroyed by Partisans ground fire in 03.1944, the remainder by US air raids on the Nis airfield in 08–09.1944. At least 5 Avia B-534 were also destroyed on the ground on Karlovo and Graf Ignatievo airfields by Allied straffing raids in 06.1944. By 01.09.1944 only 26 Avia-534s remained with 2/2 Orlyak and only 6 were in flying condition. One was lost in early September 1944 abandoned on Skopje airfield. On 10.09.1944 one was lost in air combat against Luftwaffe. From 10.09. until 12.11. 1944 the remaining Avia-534s were used as ground attack planes against the Axis. Three Avia-534s were lost to flak. A handful of surviving Avia-534s were finally scrapped in 1945.
- Messerschmitt Bf 109E (Germany) - 10 new Bf 109 E-3 were purchased and delivered in the summer of 1940. 9 more former Luftwaffe Bf 109 E-3 ones were purchased and delivered in 08.1941. Bulgarian designation - "Стрела" (Arrow). Used as fighters in 1940–1944. One was lost in an incident in 08.1942, three more in incidents in 03–04.1943, one was shot down in air combat on 24.11.1943, nine were written off on 01.08.1944 due to wear, leaving five remaining in 09.1944, four in 07.1945 and the last three being scrapped in 1946–1947.
- Avia B-135 (Czechoslovakia) - 12 of this 1939 prototype fighter were ordered from Avia plants in Czechoslovakia in 1940 and a license was purchased to produce 50 of these at the second Bulgarian airplane factory at Lovech, with Avia providing engines, armament and instruments. The planned armament was a 20 mm cannon and 2 7.92mm MGs. The Bulgarian designation was to be ДАР-11 Лястовица (Swallow). The Avia plants however were overtaken by production orders from Germany and did not supply the engines, cannons and the instruments needed for the license construction. The already contracted 12 machines were produced in 1942, delivered in Bulgaria in early 1943 and assembled in the summer of 1943 (without the cannons however). By this time Bulgaria dropped the idea of producing these and was receiving Messerschmitt Bf 109Gs from Germany. The Avia B-135s were assigned to the Fighter School at the Dolna Mitropoliya airfield as fighter-trainers. On 30.03.1944 four Avia B-135s from the Fighter School participated in air combat against USAAF, claiming a B-24 or B-17 kill. The fighter-trainers were eventually retired and scrapped by 1947.
- Dewoitine D.520 (France) - 98 or 100 (initially 48 intended, then 96, then 100, finally 114 intended, but 98 or 100 delivered) French Dewoitine D.520 were gifted from Germany to strengthen the Bulgarian air defenses in 08.1943 and delivered in 09.1943. Bulgarian designation was "Девоатин" (Dewoitine). Used as fighters against the Allied air raids in 1943–1944. 10 were lost in air combat against the Allies by the time Bulgaria switched sides, 2 by allied bombings of the Karlovo airfield in 06.1944, at least 7 in incidents, the rest being increasingly scrapped in 1944. By 31.05.1944 86 were available (25 in flyable condition), by 01.08.1944 62 were available (36 flyable condition), by 01.09.1944 - 32 (16 flyable), by 01.01.1945 - 27 (12 flyable). After the switch to Allied side in 09.1944 the remaining fighters were still used against the Axis in the Balkans until late 1944, losing 7 to Flak. The survivors were used in 1945-1947 as trainers, then scrapped.
- Messerschmitt Bf 109G (Germany) - 145 (46 delivered in 1943 and 99 in 1944) or 156 (46 in 1943 and 110 in 1944) or 164 (38 in 1943 and 126 in 1944) delivered from Germany in 1943–1944, forming the backbone of the Bulgarian Air Defense in 1943–1944. Bulgarian designation - "Стрела" (Arrow). The first 16 BG-109G-2 were ordered and received in 02.1943, the last Bf 109 G-6 were received in 08.1944, just before switching sides to the Allied sides. At least 27 were lost in incidents in 1943–1944, at least 17 in air combat against the Allies in 1943–1944, at least 2 during the June 1944 Allied bombing raids on the Bulgarian airfields, 23 were abandoned on the Skopje airfield during the retreat from Macedonia in 09.1944, 1 was lost in 09.1944 due to desertion, 9 were lost to Axis Flak in 1944 after switching sides. In 1945 Bulgaria captured (with permission from Soviet Union) as trophies at least 24 or more likely 42 Bf 109G of the latest modifications (G-6, G-10, G-12). In 1947-48 59 Bf 109G were transferred to Yugoslavia. The last Bf 109G (62 in 1946, below 40 in 1950) were used as trainers until 1950, although they were retired from the fighter units in 1947.

The first Soviet supplied fighters - 120 Yakovlev Yak-9s arrived in summer of 1945.

=== Bombers ===
- Dornier Do 11D (Germany) - 12 were gifted by Goering to Boris III in 05.1937. Bulgarian designation -"Прилеп" ("Bat"). Used as bombers until 1940, then as trainers until 1943, when scrapped.
- Bloch MB.200 (France/Czechoslovakia) - 12 purchased from Germany in 1939 from the Czech air force trophies. Bulgarian designation -"Бухал" ("Owl"). Used as bombers until 1940, then as trainers until 1946. One, later two Bloch MB.200 were converted to photo-mapping aircraft to update the maps of Bulgaria in 1941–1946.
- Avia B-71 (Soviet Union/Czechoslovakia) - 24 purchased from Germany in 1939 from the Czech air force trophies. Another 8 were delivered in 1940. Bulgarian designation -"Жерав" ("Crane").Used as bombers until 1945, including maritime patrols in the Aegean in 1941, against the Greek Drama uprising in 1941, in the war against Germany in 1944. 4 were lost in incidents (2 in 1941, 1 in 1942, 1 in 1944), none in action. 20 were available on 01.09.1944 (12 serviceable).
- Dornier Do 17 (Germany) - 29/38 - the first 11 second-hand Do 17 M/Ps were bought from Germany and delivered in 09.1940. Following the capitulation of Yugoslavia in 04.1941, the Bulgarian troops found at an abandoned airfield Petrovac (Skopje) in Macedonia 15 Do 17Ka-1s. 6 of these were sent to Plvodiv in Bulgaria and were overhauled and entered service with the Bulgarian Air Force, the other 9 was used as spare parts. In 1943 12 second-hand Do 17M-1 were delivered from Germany. Bulgarian designation - "Ураган" (Hurricane). Used as bombers until 1945, including maritime patrols in the Aegean in 1941, against the Greek Drama uprising in 1941, against the Yugoslav partisans in 1943–1944, in the war against Germany in 1944 and in 1945 as long-range transport planes from Bulgaria to 1st Bulgarian army in Hungary. 6 were lost in incidents (1 each year in 1941–1943, 3 in 1944), none in combat. 20 (14 serviceable) Do 17 M/Kas were available in the bomber regiment in 09.1944 + 5 (4 serviceable) Do 17Ps in the long-range recon unit. One was lost on Skopje airfield abandoned during the retreat in early September 1944. After the war 5 of the 6 ex-Yugoslav bombers were returned to Yugoslavia (the 6th being already lost in an incident in 1944), the rest were scrapped in 1946.
- Junkers Ju 87 (Germany) - 60 (12 in 1943 and 48 in 1944) or 52 (12 in 1943 and 40 in 1944) delivered from Germany. Bulgarian designation - "Щука" (Pike Fish). The first 12-second hand Ju 87 R-2 were delivered in 08.1943. 13 Ju 87 D-5 were delivered in 01.1944 and 19 Ju 87 D-5s in 05.1944. during the summer 1944 unknown number of additional Ju 87D-5 were received and on 01.09.1944 Bulgaria had 59 Ju 87s (1 was lost in 07.1944 in an incident). Used as strike aircraft in the 1944 war against the Axis with 4 lost in combat (2 on 16.09. from flak, 1 on 21.10. from flak, 1 on 03.11. shot down by Fw 190) and 1 due to desertion. 3 more were lost in 1945 in incidents. In 1946 the remaining 51 Ju 87s were retired (for a short time kept in storage, then scrapped).

In 1939 Bulgaria also ordered from Poland 12 (or 15) PZL.37 Łoś and 12 PZL.46 Sum, but the start of the World War II prevented the delivery. The first Soviet supplied bombers - 120 IL-2M3 and 98 Petlyakov Pe-2 arrived in summer 1945.

=== Reconnaissance ===
- Heinkel He 45 (Germany) - 12 second-hand He 45B bought from Germany in 1936. Bulgarian designation - "Щъркел" (Stork). Used until 1942, first as reconnaissance planes until 1939, then as trainers. One was lost in 1937 due to incident.
- Focke-Wulf Fw 189 Uhu (Germany) - 18 newly built Fw-189 A-1 and A-2 were delivered in late 1943. Used as reconnaissance plane, but also in 1944 war against the Axis occasionally in ground assaults. Bulgarian designation - "Циклоп" (Cyclope). One was lost in an incident in 1944, one was captured by the Germans on the Skopje airfield in early September 1944, two were shot down by flak in the war against the Axis in 1944 (1 on 19.09.1944, 1 on 31.10.1944). The remaining 14 were retired and scrapped with some still in use as trainers in the 1950s.

In 1938-1939 Bulgaria also ordered from Poland 60 LWS-3 Mewa with an option to license-build these, but the start of the World War II prevented the delivery. As mentioned above in the bomber section, the Bulgarian Air Force Long Range Reconnaissance Unit was using several Dornier Do 17Ps in 1943–1945.

=== Multi-Purpose Army Cooperation Planes ===
- DAR 3 Garvan (Bulgaria) - 24 (6 Garvan I in 1936, 6 Garvan II in 1937, 12 Garvan III in 1939) of these indigenous reconnaissance and multi-purpose planes were developed and built by the Bulgarian Darzhavna Aeroplanna Rabotilnitsa. Bulgarian designation - "Гарван" (Raven). Used as recon and army cooperation planes until 1940, then as trainers and courier planes until 1944. 4 were lost in incidents (1 in 03.1939, 1 in 05.1940, 1 in 07.1940, 1 in 10.1942).
- Letov S-328 (Czechoslovakia) - 64 (or 60) of these former Czechoslovak aircraft were purchased in 1939 and delivered in 1939. Bulgarian designation - "Врана" (Crow). Used as reconnaissance, light bomber, close air support, patrol, anti-partisan flights in Greece, Yugoslavia and Bulgaria, maritime patrols in the Aegean and the Black Sea in 1940–1944. In 01.1941 and 05.1944 two were lost in incidents, in 02.1944 one was shot down by Tito's partisans. In 1944 these versatile biplanes begun to be phased out by the Kaproni Bulgarski KB-11 Fazan. Nevertheless, the Letov S-328s were still in use on the Nish and Skopje airfields when Bulgaria changed sides in 09.1944. 6 were already damaged and destroyed on Nish airfield by Allied air raids in August 1944, some of the remaining managed to fly back to Bulgaria with one crashing during the flight on 03.09.1944. The remaining aircraft saw limited use in the operations against the Axis in 09–10.1944. The last 4 were retired as trainers in 1946.
- PZL.43 (Poland) - 50. Bulgaria ordered 12 PZL.43 in 1937 and received these in 1938. In 1939 additional 42 were ordered, but only 36 were received by 09.1939 when Poland was invaded. 2 more were eventually delivered to Bulgaria in 1941, bringing the total to 50. Used as army cooperation/close air support planes until 1942, then as trainers. 3 lost in incidents (1 each in 1940–1942). Bulgarian designation - "Чайка" (Gull). In 1944 the PZL.43 have been phased out by the Kaproni Bulgarski KB-11 Fazan. The last ones were scrapped in 1946.
- Kaproni Bulgarski KB-11 Fazan (Bulgaria) - 50 (1 prototype, 6 initial series KB 11, 43 KB 11A) of these indigenous reconnaissance and multi-purpose planes were developed in 1940-1941 and built in 1942-1944 by the Bulgarian Kaproni Bulgarski airplane factory, a subsidiary of the Italian aviation conglomerate Società Italiana Caproni. Used as reconnaissance, liaison and close air support planes until 1946, replacing Letov S-328 and PZL.43. Bulgarian designation - "Фазан" (Pheasant). 3 were lost in incidents in 10.1942, 05.1943 and 11.1944. These aircraft saw some limited use against the Axis in 1944 with 1 shot down by flak on 25.09.1944. 42 were still available in 1946, 30 were transferred to Yugoslavia in 1947.^{2017}
- DAR 10 (Bulgaria) - 2 (prototypes - A(1941) and F(1944-1945)) - the competitor of KB-11 Fazan, a true multi-purpose aircraft, which was finally not selected for production. Bulgarian designation - "Бекас" (Snipe). The first prototype was lost in an incident in 10.1942. The second prototype was finished in 03.1945 and was tested and abandoned.
- Focke-Wulf Fw 58 Weihe (Germany) - at least 8 FW-158B-1 imported (2 in 1937 and 6 in 1939). Bulgarian designation - "Гълъб" (Pigeon). Used as trainer and photo-mapping plane. 1 was lost in an incident in 02.1945. At least 2 were captured as trophies in 1945. 20 were available in 1946. 3 were given to the Civil Aviation in 1946. Used as trainers until the early 1950s.

=== Transport and Liaison ===
- Junkers Ju 52 (Germany) - 4 (2 in 1938, 2 in 1941 or 1943). Bulgarian designation - "Сова" (Owl). Used as transport planes. In 1944-1945 - several more were captured as trophies in Serbia and Austria. None were lost in incidents or from enemy actions. In 01.1946 - 6 were still available with the Air Force. In late 1946 3 were transferred to the Civilian aviation. The remaining aircraft in the Air Force were used until 1960.
- Junkers W 34 (Germany) - 2 (1 in 1933, 1 in 1944). A single Junkers W34 was bought in 1933 and another was captured in 1944. Bulgarian designation - "Дървеница" (Bedbug). Used as a transport. One crashed on 01.07.1945 on Pecs Airfield in Hungary, the other was used until 1948.
- Aero A.304 (Czechoslovakia) - 1. A single former Czechoslovakia air force Aero A.304 was purchased from Germany in 1939. Bulgarian designation - "Пеликан" (Pelican). Used until 1946 as photo-mapping, transport and patrol aircraft.
- Heinkel He 111 (Germany) - 1. A single He 111 H-16 was purchased in 1944, retaining its standard armament and was used as VIP transport until 1946 when it was transferred to the civil aviation.
- Kaproni Bulgarski KB-6 (Italy/Bulgaria) - 24 or 26 of these license Ca.309 were built by the Kaproni Bulgariski air factory in 1940–1942. Bulgarian designation - "Папагал" (Parrot). Unlike the Italian version, the Bulgarian license built one had no defensive armament, different engines (Argus instead of Alfa Romeo), but retained the opportunity to carry bombs and were used as transports, liaison planes and training bombers. 2 were lost in incidents in 1941. The remaining ones were scrapped in 1946.
- Messerschmitt Bf 108 (Germany) - 6 BF 108B.1s were eventually supplied from Germany in 1940. Bulgarian designation - "Лебед" (Swan). Used as liaison, trainers and VIP transport until 1946.
- Fieseler Fi 156 Storch (Germany) - 15 (3 Fi 156 C-3 in 1941, 12 in 1942–1944) or 19 (3 in 1941, 12 in 1943, 4 medevac version in 1944) Bulgarian designation - "Дрозд" (Thrush). Used for liaison and medical evacuation. At least 1 was lost in 1944 Allied raids on the airfields used by the Bulgarian Air Force. On 10.05.1945 one was shot down in uncertain circumstances over Hungary. 15 were still available in 1946 and were used later to supply the Communist side in the Greek Civil War. 3 were given to the Civil Aviation in 1946 as medevac planes.

=== Seaplanes ===
- Heinkel He 42 (Germany) - 3 (2 in 1942 and 1 in 1944). 2 He 42E second-hand seaplanes with no armament were delivered from Germany in 1942, with a 3rd one delivered in 08.1944 and these served as seaplane pilot trainers until 1946. Bulgarian designation - "Патица" (Duck).
- Heinkel He 60 (Germany) - 4 (2 in 1942 and 2 in 1943) - 2 He 60D-2 second-hand seaplanes were delivered from Germany in 1942 and 2 more in mid-1943. Unlike He 42 these were armed and were also used as patrol aircraft, besides their main role as seaplane pilot trainers. Bulgarian designation - "Тюлен" (Seal). Retired in the late 1940s.
- Arado Ar 196 (Germany) - 12. 12 second hand Ar-196A-3 were ordered in 1942 and delivered in 03–06.1943. Bulgarian designation - "Акула" (Shark). 1 was lost in an incident in 10.1943. Used as maritime patrol aircraft on the Black sea until the 1950s.

=== Trainers ===
- DAR-5 (Bulgaria) - 1 produced in 1930 and used as trainer and weather survey plane until 1941. Bulgarian designation - "Бръмбар" (Beetle)
- DAR 6 (Bulgaria) - 2 prototypes of this trainer were produced in 1932 and 1937.
- KB-2A (Bulgaria) - 6 produced in 1936 and used until early 40s as trainers. Bulgarian designation - "Чучулига" (Lark).
- Focke-Wulf Fw 56 Stösser (Germany) - 6. 6 FW-56 A-1s were ordered and delivered to Bulgaria in 1936. Used as trainers until 1946. At least 2 were lost in incidents - one in 1939 and one in 1940. Bulgarian designation - "Комар" (Gnat).
- DAR 8(Bulgaria) - 12. 12 produced in 1937-1938 and used as trainers until 1944. Bulgarian designation - "Славей" (Nightingale).
- KB-3 (Bulgaria) - 20 produced in 1937-1939 and used as trainers. At least 5 lost in incidents (3 in 1938, 1 in 1939, 1 in 1940). Bulgarian designation - "Чучулига I" (Lark).
- KB-4 (Bulgaria) - 28 produced in 1938-1939 and used as trainers and liaison planes until 1946. Unlike the previous versions, the KB-4 plane was armed with 1 MG for the observer. Bulgarian designation - "Чучулига II" (Lark).
- KB-5 (Bulgaria) - 45 produced in 1939-1940 and used as trainers, reconnaissance and liaison planes until the 1950s. Armed with 2 MGs (1 forward, 1 for the observer) and can carry 8 25 kg bombs, photo and radio equipment. At least 1 lost in incident (1944). Bulgarian designation - "Чучулига III" (Lark).
- Heinkel He 72 Kadett (Germany) - 6. 6 He 72B supplied in 1938 and used as trainers until 1944. Bulgarian designation - "Канарче" (Canary).
- Focke-Wulf Fw 44 Stieglitz (Germany) - 40 or 42 (6 in 1936, 6 in 1938 and 30 in 1939). Used as trainers in 1938–1949. At least 8 lost in incidents (3 in 1939, 1 in 1941, 2 in 1943, 2 in 1944) Bulgarian designation - "Врабче" (Sparrow).
- PWS-26 (Poland) - 1. A Polish PWS-26 was interned in September 1939 after two Polish pilots escaped to Bulgaria. It was subsequently used as trainer by Bulgarian Air Force. Bulgarian designation - "Юнак" (Brave).
- Bücker Bü 131 Jungmann (Germany) - 12. 12 Bücker Bü 131 Jungmann were procured in 1938. Used as trainers until the late 1940s. Bulgarian designation - "Лястовица" (Swallow).
- Avia B.122 (Czechoslovakia) - 29 (16 B.122 in 1939, 12 B.122 + 1 Ba.122 in 1940). 28 second-hand B.122 were delivered in 1939-1940 plus 1 Ba.122 was ordered directly from Avia. Used as trainers until 1948. Bulgarian designation - "Оса" (Wasp). At least 7 were lost in incidents (3 in 1941, 2 in 1943, 2 in 1945).
- DAR 9 Siniger (Bulgaria) - 42 or 45 or at least 56 (6 in 1940, at least 50 in 1940–1944). Modified license-built FW-44, with elements from DAR-6A, produced in 1940-1944 and used as trainer until 1949. 3 lost in 1945 in incidents. 19 transferred to Yugoslavia in 1947. Bulgarian designation - "Синигер" (Titmouse).
- Arado Ar 96 (Germany) - 34 (24 in 1940–41, 10 in 1944). 20 armed and 4 unarmed Ar-96B were ordered in 1939 and delivered in 1940–1941. 10 more unarmed Ar-96B-7 were delivered under the "Barbara" programme in 1944. Bulgarian designation - "Сойка" (Jay). Used as trainers and liaison planes. 1 was lost on Skopje airfield in 09.1944 (captured by the Axis forces). 1 more was lost in an incident in 09.1944. At least 19 were captured as trophies in 1945 in Hungary. 2 Avia C.2s were received as gifts from Czechoslovakia in 1948. 1 was lost in incident in 1950. Total used in Bulgaria - at least 55. Retired somewhere in the 1950s.
- Bücker Bü 181 Bestmann (Germany) - 12 (other sources claim 9, 15, 24) delivered in 1943 and used as trainers until the late 1940s
- Nardi FN.305 (Italy) - 1. Former aircraft of the Italian military attache to Bulgaria, captured in 1943, used as trainer, but lost in 06.1944 in an incident.

== Radars ==
=== Sound Locators/Direction Finders ===
- Ringtrichter-Richtungshörer (RRH) (Germany) - 2 ordered in 1936 and supplied in 1937, 53 more in 1943 and 26 in 1944

=== Anti-Air Artillery Radar ===
- FuMG 62 Wurzburg 39 T version D (Germany) - 4 bought in 1944 from Germany, 2 were supplied by 04.1944 and were used in the air-defense of Sofia. The other 2 were supplied, but were not operational during the war.

=== Air-Defense Early Warning ===
- FuMG 401 Freya LZ-A (Germany) - in 1943 Germany deployed 8 of these on Bulgarian territory, serviced by German and later by Bulgarian personnel. 6 (5?) remained in Bulgarian possession after the German retreat and were used until 1951.

== Missiles and bombs ==
From 1936 to 04.1943 Bulgaria imported 94 000 airplane bombs of German, Polish and Czech origin. The Polish imported bombs consisted of 1000 12.5 kg and 340 50 kg bombs imported in 1938–1939. As of 1 December 1939 the Bulgarian Air Force had only 9 50 kg bombs, 137 12.5 kg bombs and 5414 "pear-shaped" bombs As of 15 April 1940 the Bulgarian Air Force had 934 100 kg bombs and 179 50 kg bombs.

== Cartridges and shells ==
=== Cartridges ===
- 8×56mmR Mannlicher (Austria, Bulgaria, Czechoslovakia, etc.) - the main type of bullet adopted by the Bulgarian army in 1934 and used in its Steyr-Mannlicher rifles and carbines as well as the 8mm Machine guns, like Madsen machine gun, ZB vz. 26, MG 30, Schwarzlose machine gun and MG 08. These were produced at the State Military factory at Kazanlak, which could produce 4 mln. per year in the first half of 30s and after its modernization and expansion in the late 30s - up to 25 mln. per year, provided the necessary resources have been provided, which was rarely the case. The constantly expanding army never had enough bullets, regardless of the type, with a mere 32 mln. 8mm available in 1933, 185 mln. 8mm in the end of 1939, but only 141 mln. in 04.1940 and 219 mln. 8mm in September 1944.
- 8×50mmR Mannlicher (Austria-Hungary, Bulgaria) - the older original bullet type, still in use in the Bulgarian army in the 30s.
- 7.5×54mm French (France) - 400 000 delivered in 1941 for the 40 Renault R35
- 7.62×54mmR Mosin (Russia, Soviet Union) - used by the Mosin–Nagant which was still in use in the Bulgarian army in the 30s and the 40s. 6.531 mln. cartridges available in the end of 1939., but only 544 thousand in 04.1940
- 7.65×17mmSR Browning (Germany) - used by pistols like Sauer 38H, Dreyse M1907, Langenhan pistol, Mauser Model 1914, ČZ vz. 27, etc. 200 000 supplied in 1941–1942 with the Sauer 38H
- 7.65×21mm Parabellum (Germany, etc.) - used by older pistols like 7.65mm Model 1900/1902 Parabellum or additionally supplied pistols like Browning Hi-Power
- 7.92×57mm Mauser (Germany, Bulgaria) - used by the German and former Czechoslovak and Austrian army supplied infantry weapons like Karabiner 98k, ZB vz. 30, MG 30, MG 34, etc. in the 1940s. The State Military Factory at Kazanlak could produce these as well from 1943. 42.650 mln. available in September 1944 Also used by the majority of air force machine guns on the aircraft supplied in 1930s-1940, like MG 15, MG 17, vz.30, M1919 Browning machine gun - 27 700 available in 12.1939, 1 853 507 in 04.1940.
- 7.92×94mm Patronen (Germany) - used by the Panzerbüchse 39. 27 000 available in 09.1944.
- 9×19mm Parabellum (Germany, Bulgaria) - used by various sub-machine guns - ZK-383 and MP 40 and pistols like Luger P-08, Walther P38, Star Model BM, Radom pistol, etc. in the Bulgarian armed forces. These were produced at the State Military factory at Kazanlak, which could produce 200 000 per year in the first half of 30s and after its modernization and expansion in the late 30s - up to 1-2 mln. per year, provided the necessary resources have been provided, which was rarely the case. Slightly above 1 mln. 9mm bullets were available in 1933, and again in the end of 1939, 1, 876 mln. in 04.1940 and 9.85 mln. in 09.1944, 5 548 680 used in the war in 1944–1945.
- 20×105mm B (Switzerland) - used by the Solothurn S-18/100 anti-tank rifle. Produced at the State Military factory at Kazanlak. 63 thousand available at the end of 1939, 66 thousand in 04.1940 and 225 thousand in 09.1944 5 371 used in the war in 1944–1945.

7 857 533 rifle bullets, 20 508 264 MG bullets and 790 964 pistol bullets of different calibres have been used in the war in 1944–1945.

=== Shells ===
- 20×138mmB (Germany) - used by the 2 cm Flak 30/38. Produced by the State Military Factories in Kazanlak and Sopot. 319 746 shells available in 12.1939, 322 638 in 04.1940, 880 000 in 09.1944. 45 278 used in the war in 1944–1945.
- 37×94R (France) - 10000 HE and 10000 AP purchased in 1941 for the 40 Renault R-35 5000 more were supplied in 10.1944 from the Soviet Union.
- 37×249mmR (Germany) - used by the 3.7 cm Pak 36. 75 000 shells available in 09.1944.
- 37 × 263B (Germany) - used by the 3.7 cm Flak 18/36/37. 27 750 shells available in 09.1944.
- 37x268R (Czechoslovakia) - 5000 AP and 10000 HE purchased in 1939-1940 for the 36 Panzer 35(t). Also used for the 3,7cm KPÚV vz. 37. 166 000 shells available in 09.1944. 46 093 used in the war in 1944–1945.
- 37 x 380R (Germany) - used by the 3.7 cm SK C/30 of the Navy. 994 shells available in 12.1939 and 1127 shells in 04.1940.
- 47x186R (Great Britain) - 2000 HE and 2000 AP purchased in 1936 for the 8 Vickers Mk E 3840 available in 04.1940. 3000 more were supplied in 10.1944 from the Soviet Union.
- 47mm shells (France) - used by the QF 3-pounder Hotchkiss of the Navy. 918 shells available in 12.1939, 916 shells in 04.1940.
- 50mm rounds (Germany) - used by the 5 cm Granatwerfer 36. 155 000 shells available in 09.1944. 14 348 used in the war in 1944–1945.
- 50×419mmR (Germany) - used by the 5 cm Pak 38. 166 750 shells available in 09.1944. 7 122 used in the war in 1944–1945.
- 65 x 470R (France) - used by the Canon de 65 mm Modèle 1891 of the Navy. 19 shells available in 12.1939 and 04.1940.
- 75×714R (Germany) - used by the 7.5 cm Pak 40. 37 000 shells available in 09.1944. 9 191 used in the war in 1944–1945.
- 75×350R (Germany) - used by the 7.5 cm Pak 97/38. 101 000 shells available in 09.1944. 2 545 used in the war in 1944–1945.
- 75×495R (Germany) - 92000 were planned to be delivered in 1943-1944 for the Panzer IV, 32 210 have been received by 02.1944 as per Bulgarian data, 48 757 by later German data. In 10.1944 Soviet Union supplied 100 000 from its trophies.
- 75mm shells (France, Germany) - used by the variety of 75 mm Pre-WWI field guns in Bulgarian service. Large quantities were hidden after WWI in various places, including the Black Sea shoals and were recovered in the 1930s and after inspection and service at the Bulgarian Military Factories at Kazanlak and Sopot were put into use. Thus this was one of the rare instances were there was actually more ammo than required in the wartime plans. Additional quantities could be produced at the Military factories. There were 911 126 shells available in late 1939, 584 434 shells in 04.1940 and 815 500 in 09.1944. 130 477 used in the war in 1944–1945.
- 75 x 129 mm R, 75 x 212mm R, 75×130 mm. R, etc. (Germany, etc.) - used by the variety of 75 mm mountain guns in the Bulgarian service, both World War I types (Skoda, etc.) and the ones delivered in the 1930-1940-s (like Bofors, Gebirgsgeschütz 36, etc.). Most of these could be produced at the Bulgarian military factories. 247 855 shells available in 12.1939, 160 095 shells in 04.1940 and 156 500 in 09.1944. 44 868 "Bofors", 29 826 "Skoda", 12 963 L/12 shells used in the war in 1944–1945.
- 75mm shells - used by 7.5 cm Flak L/59. 37 000 available in 09.1944.
- 76.5 x 346mm R (Czechoslovakia, Germany) - used by the 8 cm PL kanon vz. 37. 34 670 shells available in 09.1944.
- 77 x 230mm R (Germany) - used by the 7.7 cm FK 16. 6 580 shells available in 12.1939, 3 057 shells available in 04.1940.
- Wurfgranate (Germany) - used by the 8 cm Granatwerfer 34. Produced in the State Military Factory in Kazanlak. 71 260 available in the end of 1939, 68 922 in 04.1940, 762 000 (together with Brandt) in 09.1944. 456 823 (together with Brandt) used in the war in 1944–1945.
- 88X560mmR (Germany) - used by 8.8 cm Flak 16. 10 000 shells available in 12.1939.
- 88×571mmR (Germany) - used by 8.8 cm Flak 18/36/37/41. 10 315 shells available in 12.1939, 9 843 shells in 04.1940, 88 211 in 09.1944.
- 9cm shell (Germany) - used by 9 cm Kanone C/73. 20 744 shells available in 12.1939, 5 000 in 04.1940.
- 100 x 869 mm R (France) - used by Canon de 100 mm Modèle 1891. 1064 shells available in 12.1939 and 04.1940.
- 105mm shells (Germany) - used by the variety of 105 mm field and mountain howitzers. Could be produced in the military factories in Bulgaria. 68 352 shells available in 12.1939, 105 153 shells in 04.1940 and 326 500 in 09.1944. 5 507 "Krupp", 85 082 "Belgian howitzer L/22", 137 455 L/28 and 22 230 L/30 Rheinmetall shells used in the war in 1944–1945.
- 105mm shells (Germany) - types of shells used by the 10 cm K 14 and 10.5cm Belagerungskanone L/30 "long guns", as well as the 10 cm schwere Kanone 18. 44 137 shells available in 12.1939, 44 444 in 04.1940 (13 142 for L/30, 31 302 for K 14), 27 000 in 09.1944 22 158 L/56 "Krupp" shells used in the war in 1944–1945.
- 120 x 142R (France) - used by Obusier de 120 mm mle 15TR. 68 386 shells available in 12.1939, 69 470 in 04.1940, 25 700 in 09.1944.
- 120mm shells (France) - used by 120 mm Schneider-Canet M1897 long gun. 3907 available in 12.1939, 2566 in 04.1940.
- 122 × 785R (Soviet Union) - used by 122 mm gun M1931/37 (A-19) supplied in 1943. 13 100 shells available in 09.1944. 6 786 used in the war in 1944–1945.
- 149mm shells (Germany) - used by 150 mm/L25 Krupp Model 1891 heavy fortress gun. 369 shells available in 12.1939 and 04.1940.
- 149 mm × 260 R (Germany) - used by the 15 cm sFH 18. 17 907 used in the war in 1944–1945.
- 150mm shells (Germany) - used by the 15 cm Ring Kanone C/92. 839 shells available in 12.1939 and 04.1940.
- 150mm shells (Germany, Austria-Hungary) - used by the variety of World War I 150 mm howitzers in the Bulgarian army. Could be produced in the Bulgarian Military Factories since 1943. 39 256 shells available in 12.1939, 40 014 in 04.1940, 44 000 in 09.1944. 1 625 L/14 shells used in the war in 1944–1945.
- 152mm shells (Russia, Germany) - used by the 152 mm 45 caliber Pattern 1892. 2260 shells available in 12.1939 and 04.1940.
- 153 x 577 x 175 (Germany) - used by 15 cm L/40 Feldkanone i.R. 409 shells available in 12.1939 and 04.1940.
- 155mm shells (France) - used by Canon de 155 C modèle 1917 Schneider - former Belgian or French howitzers, supplied in 1942 from Germany. 27 920 shells available in 09.1944.
- 209.3mm shells (Germany) - used by 21 cm L/35. 42 shells available in 12.1939 and 192 in 04.1940
- 220mm shells (France) - used by 220 mm TR mle 1915/1916. 7970 shells available in 09.1944.
- 229mm shells (Russia) - used by 9-inch mortar M1877. 133 shells available in 12.1939 and 04.1940.
- 240mm shells (France) - used by Schneider-Canet 240mm coast gun M. 1907. 239 shells available in 12.1939 and 04.1940.
- 254mm shells (Russia) - used by 254 mm 45 caliber Pattern 1891. 403 shells available in 12.1939 and 550 in 04.1940.

== Mines, Torpedoes, Depth Charges ==
=== Naval Mines ===
Bulgaria had 312 naval mines in 12.1939 and 550 in 04.1940. In the beginning of the war these were mostly the Bulgarian design types Б-36, Б-38 and Б-40, developed jointly by the engineer Mincho Ostrev and the fleet officer Dimitar Dudev in 1936–1938. 274 of these Bulgarian mines were ordered in 1937, 287 more in 1938. These were produced in a machine factory in Ruse and then armed at the Military factory in Kazanlak. In 03.1941 additional 700 EMA and 150 UMA mines were delivered from Germany.

=== Depth Charges ===
The Bulgarian Navy had 94 depth charges at the beginning of the war. These were the German types WBD and WBF. In addition 47 WBF were delivered in 1941. The Bulgarian torpedo boats could carry 8-10 of these each. 98 were available in 1945.

=== Torpedoes ===
The Bulgarian Navy had 16 450mm torpedoes at the beginning of the war. These were used by the 8 torpedo tubes available for the old Drazki torpedo boats. The other type of torpedoes used were 533mm by the newer torpedo boats. None were available in 12.1939 and 04.1940, but 25 were delivered in 11.1941 and 33 available in 1945.

== History ==
=== Bulgarian Army ===
SMG

In 1 September 1944, the Bulgarian Army has 11,033 SMGs, 1534 of these are lost in the fighting by the end of the year. By January 1945, 9320 9mm SMGs were still available. By January 1, 1946, the Bulgarian army had: 3,043 ZK-383; 5,440 MP 40; 6,152 PPS-43; 4,421 PPSh-41.

=== Bulgarian Gendarmerie ===
SMG

Several hundred SMGs were supplied to the Bulgarian Gendarmerie (formed in 1944) to fight the partisans.

=== Bulgarian Police ===
SMG

The Bulgarian Police was supplied independently from the army and also had SMG. In fact in 1939 only the police had a modest number of SMGs, while army had none. Additional SMGs were delivered during the war.

=== Bulgarian Partisans ===
SMG

The Bulgarian Partisans also used in 1941-1944 a significant number of SMGs (2040 estimated by 09.1944). Besides the captured police and army ones, they also used Allied and Soviet supplied ones like PPSh-41 and Thompson submachine gun
