= Mercedes-Benz L 4500 =

L 4500
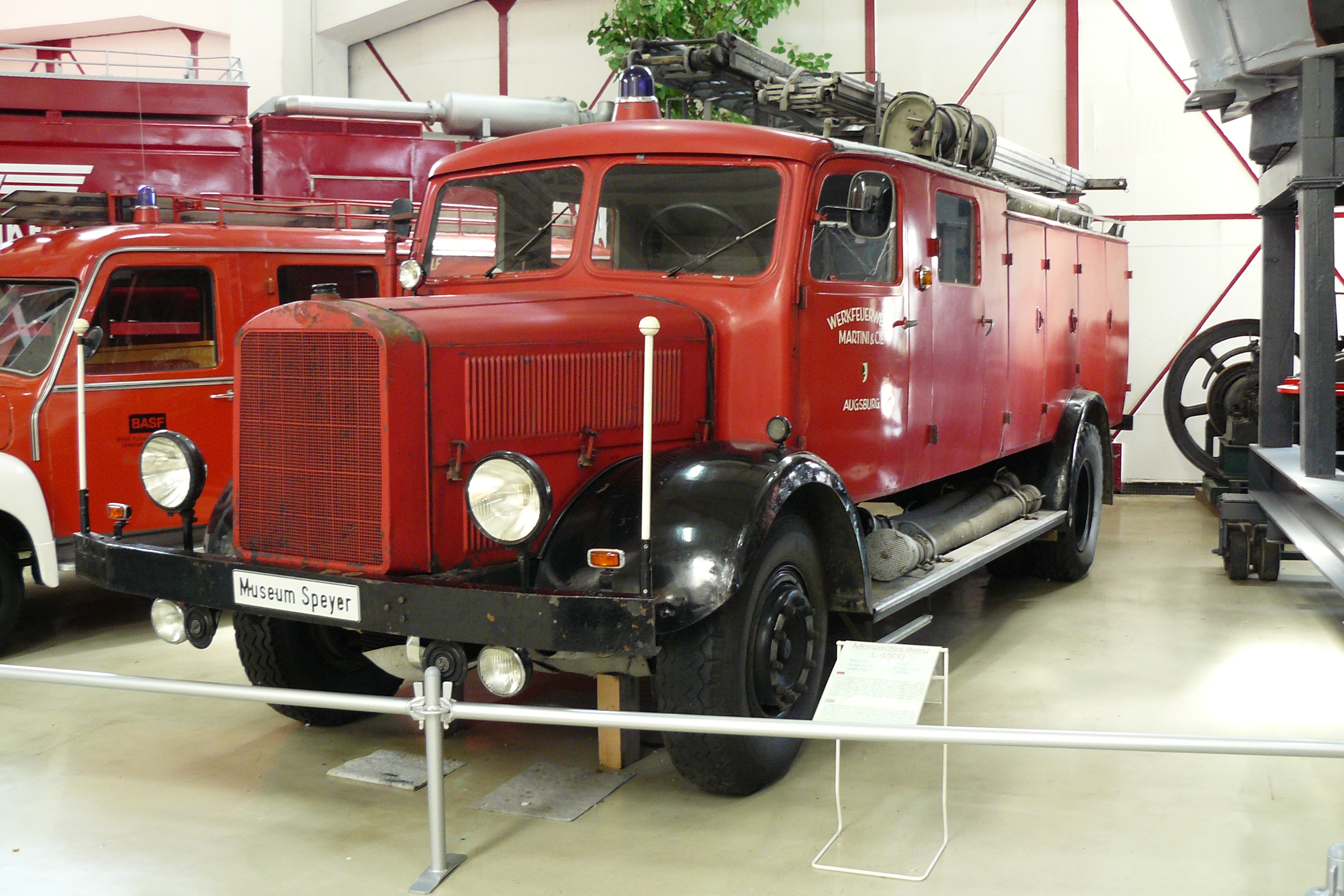
- Mercedes-Benz L 4500 S

Overview
- Type: Truck
- Manufacturer: Daimler-Benz AG
- Production: 1939 – 1945
- Assembly: Germany: Gaggenau; Austria: Simmering

Body and chassis
- Class: 4,5 t truck
- Body style: long bonnet truck
- Layout: Front engine, rear-wheel-drive Front engine, all-wheel-drive
- Platform: L 4500

Powertrain
- Engine: Mercedes-Benz OM 67/4, (Diesel, 7274 cm^{3}, 82 kW)
- Transmission: Manual five-speed
- Propulsion: Tyres

Dimensions
- Wheelbase: 4600 mm
- Length: 7860 mm
- Width: 2350 mm
- Height: 3345 mm
- Kerb weight: 5717 kg

The Mercedes-Benz L 4500 was a heavy duty truck by Mercedes-Benz. It was built by Daimler-Benz from 1939 – 1944 in the Mercedes-Benz plant Gaggenau, and from 1944 – 1945 by Saurer. The vehicle is a long-bonnet truck and was offered as a rear-wheel-drive truck (L 4500 S) and as an all-wheel-drive truck (L 4500 A). The German Wehrmacht used the L 4500 with armoured cabins as Flak trucks during World War II. Due to the lack of production material, the cabin was replaced with the simplified standardised Wehrmacht cabin and the mudwings with simplified wings in 1943. Also, the L 4500 chassis was used for the Sonderkraftfahrzeug 4.

L4500 was also used as the designation until 1954 for the Mercedes-Benz L 312 built from 1953 to 1961.

== Description ==
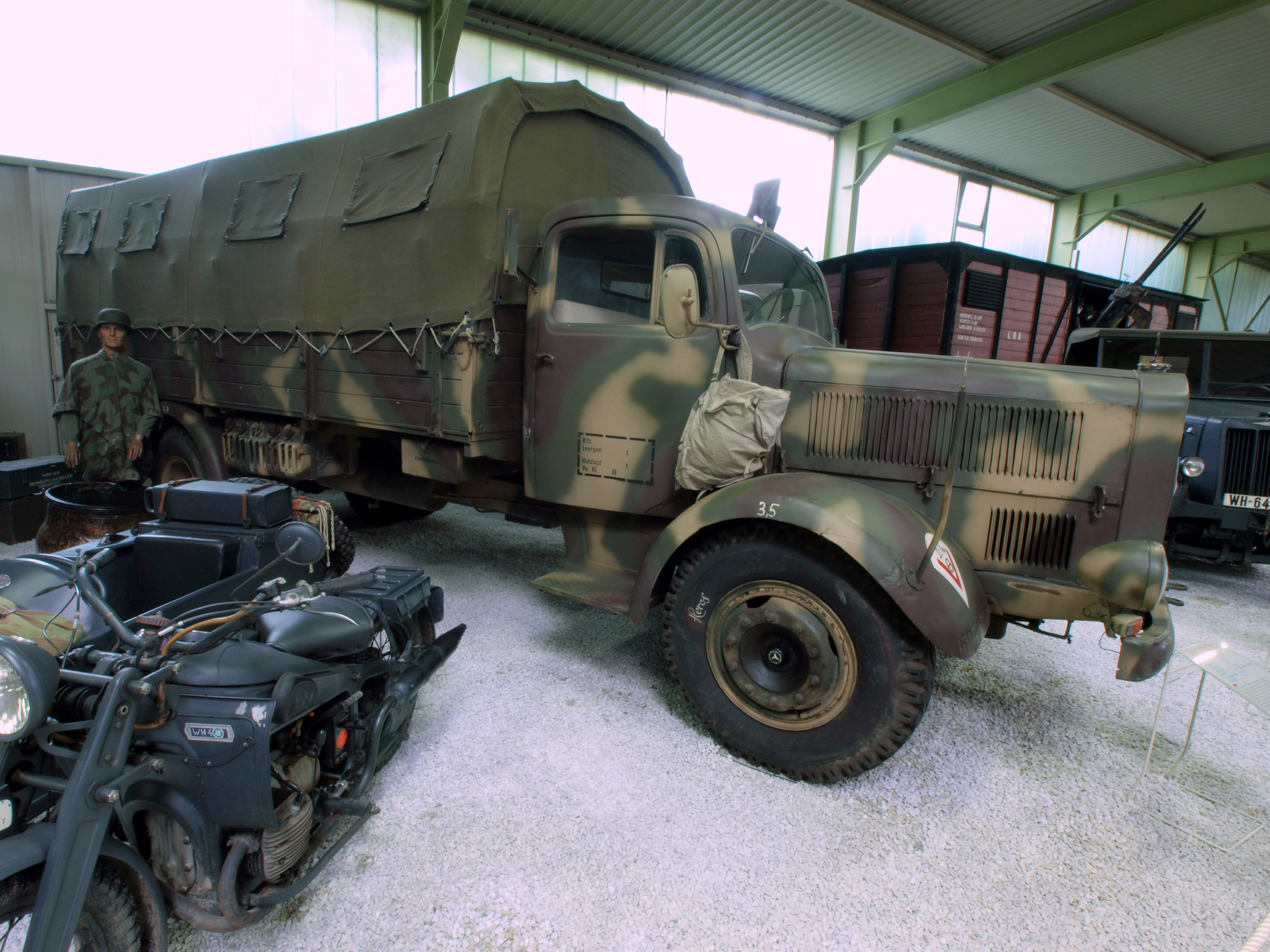
Wehrmacht L 4500 S

The L 4500 is a truck with a long bonnet, U-shape ladder frame and two beam axles. Both axles are leaf sprung. The front axle has single wheels whereas the rear axle has twin wheels. The tyres have the size 10.5—20". A pneumo-hydraulic brake-system is used, each wheel has a drum brake, the parking brake locks the rear wheels only. For steering, a ZF Type 721 steering system is used. From the engine, the torque is transmitted to a manual five-speed gearbox with a single disc dry clutch. The gearbox has a reduction gear. Only the rear wheels are driven. Unlike the L 4500 S, the L 4500 A has an offroad gear, which automatically switches on the front-wheel-drive, and disables even torque distribution. The Mercedes-Benz OM 67/4 Diesel engine was installed in the L 4500. It is a six-cylinder, straight, four-stroke, precombustion-chamber-injected, water-cooled diesel engine with OHV-Valvetrain.

=== Production figures ===
Year	Production figures
1939	7
1940	0
1941	1959
1942	2653
1943	2696
1944/45	1914
Sum	9229

== Bibliography ==
- Gaier, Achim (2020). Mercedes-Benz LKW: Die legendären Langhauber 1945-1962 [Mercedes-Benz Trucks: The legendary long-bonnet vehicles 1945-1962] (in German). Stuttgart: Motorbuch Verlag. ISBN 9783613043237.
- Frank, Reinhard: Mercedes im Kriege – Personenwagen, Lastkraftwagen, Sonderaufbauten. Podzun-Pallas-Verlag, Dorheim. 1985. ISBN 3-7909-0244-6
- Ware, Pat: The Illustrated Guide to Military Vehicles: A complete reference guide to over 100 years of military vehicles. Anness Publishing – Hermes House. London. 2010. S. 143. ISBN 978-1-84681-585-0
- Oswald, Werner: Kraftfahrzeuge der Reichswehr, Wehrmacht und Bundeswehr, Motorbuchverlag, Stuttgart 1970, p. 125
