= 120 mm Schneider-Canet M1897 long gun =

Schneider-Canet 120mm long gun M. 1897
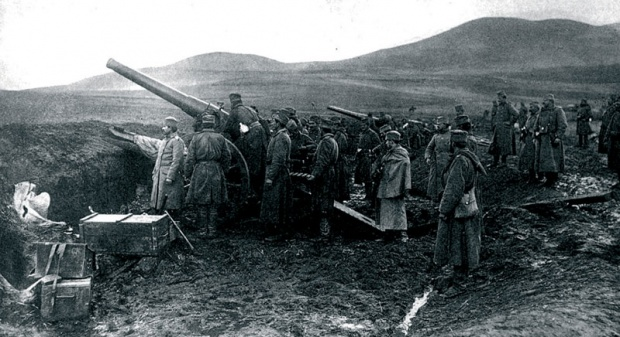
- M1897 in use with the Serbian Army, date unknown
- Type: Heavy/Siege gun
- Place of origin: France

Service history
- In service: 1897–1918
- Used by: Bulgaria; Serbia
- Wars: Balkan Wars; World War I

Production history
- Designer: Gustave Canet
- Manufacturer: Schneider et Cie
- Produced: 1897

Specifications
- Mass: Travel: 3,450 kg (7,610 lb); Combat: 3,080 kg (6,790 lb)
- Barrel length: 3.12 m (10 ft 3 in)
- Shell weight: 18 kg (39 lb 11 oz)
- Caliber: 120 mm (4.7 in)
- Elevation: -12° to +28°
- Muzzle velocity: 575 m/s (1,890 ft/s)
- Maximum firing range: HE 8.4 km (5.2 mi); Shrapnel 6 km (3.7 mi)

120 mm Schneider-Canet M1897 long gun was a heavy artillery piece manufactured by the French company Schneider-Creusot. It was a slow firing gun without a recoil mechanism but with significant range and weight of the shell.

Serbia ordered 17 pieces in 1897. However, only 16 were delivered in 1902. Serbia entered the First Balkan War with 15 pieces (6 batteries), since one gun was destroyed during the exercises before the war. It was used in the First and Second Balkan Wars and in the first phase of the First World War (1914-1915). Most of the surviving pieces were abandoned and destroyed before the Serbian retreat to Albania.

Bulgaria also ordered this type in 1897, and received 24 pieces and used them in the Balkan and First World Wars. Serbian type (L/26) and Bulgarian (L/28) were slightly different in respect of the breech lock while in other aspects they were identical.
