= Langenhan pistol =

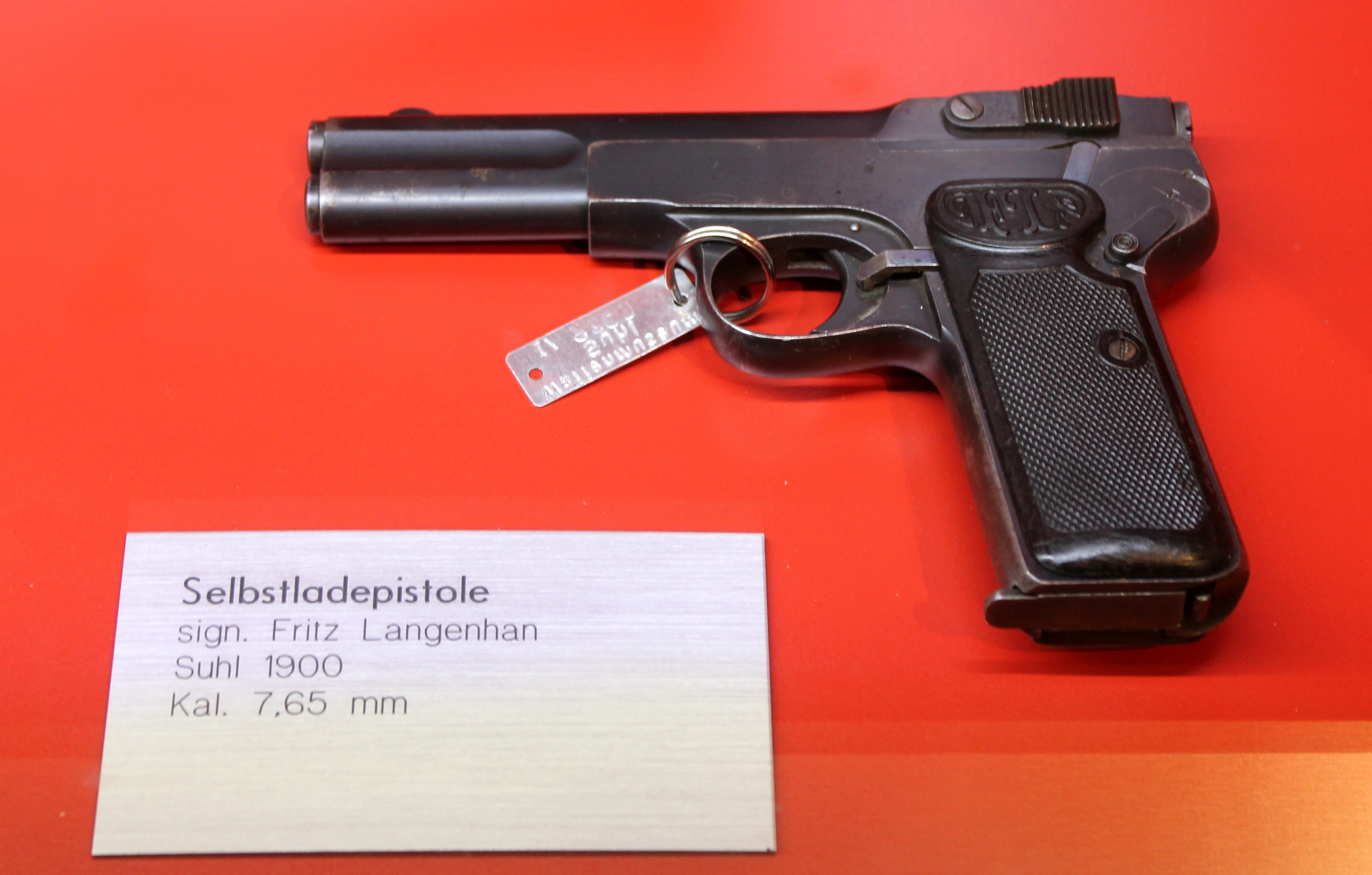
- Langenhan pistol
- Type: Semi-automatic pistol
- Place of origin: German Empire

Production history
- Designer: Friedrich Langenhan
- Manufacturer: Friedrich Langenhan's Gewehr- und Fahrradfabrik
- Produced: 1914–1917
- No. built: Approx. 55,000

Specifications
- Mass: 1.43 lb (0.65 kg)
- Barrel length: 3.94 in (10.0 cm)
- Cartridge: .32 ACP
- Action: Blowback
- Feed system: 8-rounds box magazine

The Langenhan pistol, officially known as the F.L. Selbstlader Cal. 7,65, is a German pistol, designed by Friedrich Langehan and used by German military men, and the police during World War I. The design of the pistol is also similar to the design of FN M1900 pistol. About 55,000 pistols were produced.

== History ==
Designed by Friedrich Langenhan out of Zella-Mehlis, Germany, the Langenhan was in production from 1914 to 1917. The Langenhans were used by the German military from 1915 until an unknown date, and by the German police after World War I. Over 55,000 were made, with a decent amount still in existence.

== Features ==
The Langenhan was a simple blowback pistol fed by an eight-round single-stack detachable box magazine stored in the grip; the pistol is almost an exact mechanical copy of the FN M1900. The return spring for the slide is located just above the barrel; cartridges are ejected off to the right of the weapon. The Langenhan's slide was held on only by one screw which tends to wear down and rattle loose through continuous firing. If this goes unnoticed, the slide could fly off the weapon and hit the shooter, possibly injuring him/her.

== Users ==
- Germany - used by military men and police officers.
