= List of former Bulgarian military aircraft =

This is a list of aircraft formerly used by the Bulgarian Air Force and Bulgarian Navy. For aircraft currently in service, see List of active Bulgarian military aircraft.

== Aircraft ==
Aircraft	Local name	Origin	Type	TOS	WFU	#
Aero A.304	Pelikan	Czechoslovakia	Bomber	1939	1943	1
Aero L-29	-	Czechoslovakia	Trainer	1965	2002	150
Aero MB.200 (Note: Bloch MB.200 built under licence in Czechoslovakia by Aero and Avia)	Buhal (Owl)	France/Czechoslovakia	Bomber	1939	1941	6
Albatros B.I	-	Germany	Reconnaissance	1914	1916	2
Albatros C.III (Note: Also built in Bulgaria as DAR-2)	-	Germany	Reconnaissance	1916	1934+	38+
Albatros D.III	-	Germany	Fighter	1918	1918	few
Albatros F.2	-	Germany	Utility	1912	1914	3
Albatros L 73	-	Germany	Transport	1929	?	2
Antonov An-2	-	USSR	Transport	1956	2001	87
Antonov An-14	-	USSR	Transport	1966	1993	8
Antonov An-24	-	USSR	Transport	1967	2001	12+
Arado Ar 65	Orel (Eagle)	Germany	Fighter	1937	1940	12
Arado Ar 96	Soyka (Jay)	Germany	Trainer	1940	1953	34
Arado Ar 196	Akula (Shark)	Germany	Recon floatplane	1943	1945	12
Armstrong Whitworth F.K.3	-	United Kingdom	Reconnaissance	1917	?	1 (Note: Captured)
Avia B-71 (Note: Tupolev SB built under licence in Czechoslovakia by Avia)	Jerav (Crane)	USSR/Czechoslovakia	Bomber	1939	1945	42
Avia B-122	Osa (Wasp)	Czechoslovakia	Trainer	1939	1951	28
Avia B-135	Lyastovitsa (Swallow)	Czechoslovakia	Fighter	1943	1944	12
Avia B.534-IV	Dogan (Hunting Hawk)	Czechoslovakia	Fighter	1939	1945	78
Bleriot XI, XIbis and XI-2	-	France	Trainer/reconnaissance	1912	1916	16
Blériot XXI	-	France	Reconnaissance	1912	1913	1
Bristol Boxkite	-	United Kingdom	Trainer	1912	1912	1
Bristol Prier monoplane	-	United Kingdom	Trainer	1912	1913	6
Bristol Primary Trainer/Lucifer	-	United Kingdom	Trainer	1926	?	1
Bristol Type 88 Tourer	-	United Kingdom	Utility	1924	1926	5
Bücker Bü 131	Ljastovica (Swallow)	Germany	Trainer	1938	1949+	12-15
Bücker Bü 181	-	Germany	Trainer	1943	1944	15-24
Caudron C.59	-	France	Trainer	1924	?	3
Caudron C.440 Goéland	-	France	Transport	1936	1936	1
DAR 1 & 1A	Peperuda (Butterfly)	Bulgaria	Trainer	1926	1940+	20
DAR 3/Lazarov Laz-3	Garvan (Raven)	Bulgaria	Reconnaissance	1929	1940	31
DAR 5	Brambar (Beetle)	Bulgaria	Bomber	1930	?	1
DAR 6	-	Bulgaria	Trainer	1932	?	3
DAR 7	-	Bulgaria	?	1935	?	1
DAR 8	Slavei (Nightingale)	Bulgaria	Trainer	1940	1941	12
DAR 10	Bekas (Snipe)	Bulgaria	Reconnaissance	1941	1949	2
Dewoitine D.520	-	France	Fighter	1943	1947	120
DFW C.Va (Note: Also built in Bulgaria as DAR U-1)	-	Germany	Reconnaissance	1917	?	19
Dornier Do 11D	Prilep (Bat)	Germany	Bomber	1937	1941	12
Dornier Do 17	Uragan (Hurricane)	Germany	Bomber	1940	1945	44-51 (Note: Some captured from Yugoslavia)
Farman VII (via Russia)	-	France	Utility	1912	1915	5
Fieseler Fi 156C-3	Drozd (Thrush)	Germany	Reconnaissance/Liaison	1940	1953	19
Focke-Wulf A 20	-	Germany	Transport	1930	1934+	1
Focke-Wulf Fw 43	-	Germany	Trainer	1939	?	1
Focke-Wulf Fw 44 (Note: Also built in Bulgaria as DAR-6 and DAR-9)	Sinijert/Vrabche (Chickadee/Sparrow)	Germany	Trainer	1936	1957	109
Focke-Wulf Fw 56	Komar (Mosquito)	Germany	Trainer	1936	1940	6
Focke-Wulf Fw 58	Gulub (Dove)	Germany	Trainer/transport	1937	1950 c.	34
Focke-Wulf Fw 189A	Nebesno Oko (Eye of the Sky/ Sky eye)	Germany	Reconnaissance	1943	1950 c.	19
Fokker D.VII	-	Germany	Fighter	1918	1927+	8
Fokker E.III	-	Germany	Fighter	1915	1916	3
Friedrichshafen FF.33L	-	Germany	Recon floatplane	1916	1917	8
Grigorov-1	-	Bulgaria	Recon floatplane	?	?	1
Hanriot HD-14	-	France	Trainer	1924	?	1+
Heinkel He 42	Patica (Duck)	Germany	Recon floatplane	1942	?	2
Heinkel He 45B	Starkel (Stark?)	Germany	Bomber	1936	1942	12
Heinkel He 51B	Sokol (Falcon)	Germany	Fighter	1936	1940	12
Heinkel He 60	Tulen (Seal)	Germany	Reconnaissance	1942	1944	5
Heinkel He 72	Kanarche (Canary)	Germany	Trainer	1936	1940	6
Heinkel He 111H-16	-	Germany	Transport/Bomber	1943	1944	1
Ilyushin Il-2	-	USSR	Attack	1945	1958	130
Ilyushin Il-10/Avia B.33	-	USSR	Attack	1951	1958	100 c.
Ilyushin Il-14	-	USSR	Transport	1958	1982	20+
Ilyushin Il-28	-	USSR	Bomber/reconnaissance	1955	1974	15
Jordanov-1	-	Bulgaria	Reconnaissance	1915	?	1
Junkers A 20	-	Germany	Bomber	1932	?	1
Junkers F 13	-	Germany	Transport	1927	1928	2
Junkers W 34	-	Germany	Transport	1944	1949 c.	1
Junkers Ju 52/3m	Sowa (Owl)	Germany	Transport	1938	1960	12
Junkers Ju 87	Sztuka (Stuka)	Germany	Bomber	1943	1945	52
Kamov Ka-25Tz	-	USSR	Anti-Submarine Helicopter	1984	1991	1
Kaproni-Bulgarski KB-1 (Note: Caproni Ca.100 built under licence by Bulgarian subsidiary of Caproni.)	Peperuda (Butterfly)	Italy	Trainer	1932	?	7
Kaproni-Bulgarski KB-2, 3, 4 & 5 (Note: Caproni Ca.113 built under licence by Bulgarian subsidiary of Caproni.)	Chuchuliga (Lark)	Italy	Trainer	1933	1949	107
Kaproni-Bulgarski KB-6/KB-309 (Note: Caproni Ca.309 built under licence by Bulgarian subsidiary of Caproni.)	Papagal (Parrot)	Italy/Bulgaria	Bomber	1940	1946	12
Kaproni Bulgarski KB-11	Fazan (Pheasant)	Bulgaria	Liaison	1940	1947	50
Lazarov Laz-7	-	Bulgaria	Trainer	1948	1967?	313
Lazarov Laz-8	-	Bulgaria	Transport	1949	1958	1
Let L-200	-	Czechoslovakia	Transport	1960	1964	4
Letov Š-18	-	Czechoslovakia	Trainer	1925	1926	10
Letov Š-328	Vrana (Crow or Raven)	Czechoslovakia	Reconnaissance	1939	1946	62
Lisunov Li-2	-	USSR	Transport	1946?	1979	12
LVG B.II (Note: Misidentified in some sources as an LVG C.II as they were later armed.)	-	Germany	Reconnaissance	1915	1917?	12
Messerschmitt Bf 108B	Lebed (Swan)	Germany	Liaison	1940	1944	6
Messerschmitt Bf 109	Strela (Arrow)	Germany	Fighter	1939	1947	168
MiG-15	-	USSR	fighter	1951	1981	272 c.
MiG-17	-	USSR	Fighter	1955	1990	94+
Lim-6	-	Poland	Fighter	?	?	31
MiG-19	-	USSR	Fighter	1958	1986	70+
MiG-21	-	USSR	Fighter/Attack/Reconnaissance	1963	2015	226
MiG-23	-	USSR	Fighter/Attack	1973	2004?	180
MiG-25 (Note: Traded for MiG-23s)	-	USSR	Reconnaissance	1982	1991	4
Mil Mi-1	-	USSR	Utility helicopter	1957	1993	4
Mil Mi-2	-	USSR	Transport helicopter	1957	?	42+
Mil Mi-4	-	USSR	Transport Helicopter	1957	1991	60
Mil Mi-6	-	USSR	Heavy Transport Helicopter	1972	1989	6
Mil Mi-8	-	USSR	Transport Helicopter	1970	?	36
Nieuport IV	-	France	Utility	1912	1913	2
Nieuport 24	-	France	Fighter	1917	1918	2
Otto C.I	-	Germany	Reconnaissance	1915	1917	13
Petlyakov Pe-2	-	USSR	Bomber	1945	1958	98
Polikarpov Po-2	-	USSR	Utility	1946	1969	1+
Potez VIII	-	France	Trainer	?	?	2
Potez XVII	-	France	Reconnaissance	1925	?	30
PZL P.24	Yastreb (Hawk)	Poland	Fighter	1937	1942	82
PZL.43	Chaika (Gull)	Poland	Bomber	1937	1944	47
PWS-26	Yunak (Hero)	Poland	Trainer	?	?	1
Roland D.II	-	Germany	Fighter	1917	1918	6
Roland D.III	-	Germany	Fighter	1918	1920	6
Sukhoi Su-22	-	USSR	Fighter-bomber	1984	2004	18 Su-22M4, 3 Suу-22UM
Sukhoi Su-25 (Note: Grounded 2012. 10 to Georgia 2013.)	-	USSR	Attack	1986	2012	42
Tupolev Tu-2	-	USSR	Bomber	1946	1954	36
Tupolev Tu-154M	-	USSR	Transport	1991	1999	1
Yakovlev Yak-9	-	USSR	Fighter/Trainer	1944	1955	180+
Yakovlev Yak-11	-	USSR	Trainer	1948	1991	50
Yakovlev Yak-12	-	USSR	Transport	1947	1948	2
Yakovlev Yak-18	-	USSR	Trainer	1958	1996	16+
Yakovlev Yak-23	-	USSR	Fighter	1949	1958 c.	24
Yakovlev Yak-40	-	USSR	Transport	1975	2001	1
Zlín Z 142	-	Czechoslovakia	Trainer	1995	1996	4
