= Braunschweig LF-1 Zaunkönig =

LF-1 Zaunkönig
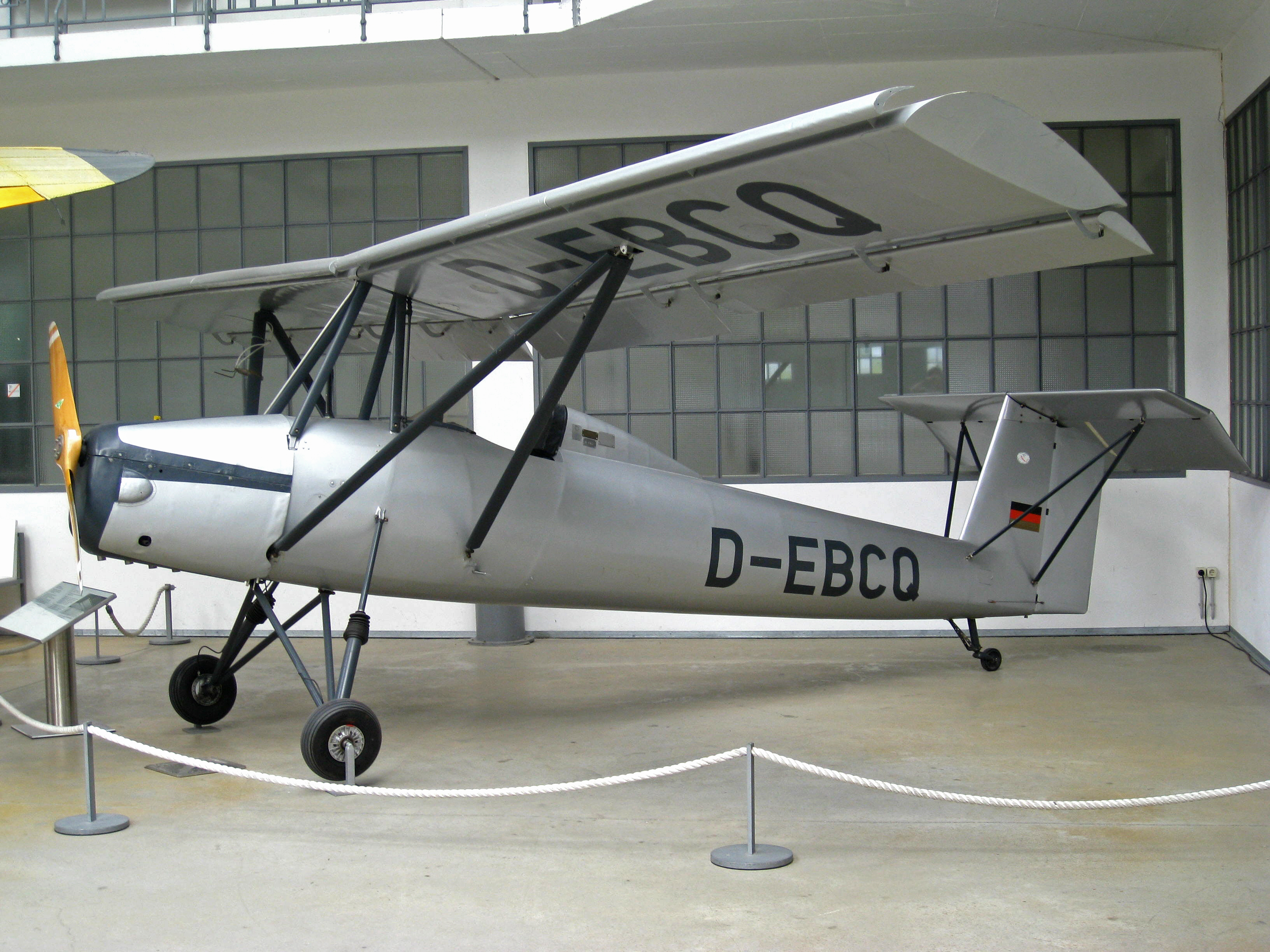
- The second Zaunkönig D-EBCQ preserved in the Deutsches Museum, Oberschleissheim, in July 2008

General information
- Type: STOL light aircraft
- National origin: Germany
- Manufacturer: TU Braunschweig
- Designer: Hermann Winter
- Number built: 4

History
- First flight: December 1940

The Braunschweig LF-1 Zaunkönig, (LF – Langsames Flugzeug – literally, slow aircraft), is a STOL single-seat light aircraft. It was designed in 1939 by Prof. Ing. Hermann Winter as a fool-proof trainer for novice student pilots to experience solo flight.

== Design and development ==
The LF-1 was designed by Prof. Dr.-Ing. Hermann Winter and some of his students from the Technische Universität Braunschweig, Lower Saxony, Germany. Winter was a former chief engineer at the Bulgarian company, DAR (Drzhavnata Aeroplanna Rabotilnitsa in Cyrillic ДАР – Държавната аеропланна работилница), where he created a line of aircraft; DAR-1, DAR-1A, DAR-2, DAR-3 Garvan, tri motor DAR-4, DAR 5 Brambar, DAR-6 and DAR-7 as well as the DAR Zdravka Vekilski and DAR Zdravka Toprakchiev gliders for the Bulgarian Army.

The LF-1 is a parasol wing monoplane with a high-set tailplane, powered by a Zündapp Z 9-092 engine delivering 37 kW (50 hp), able to operate from a 100 m (330 ft) airstrip. The two-piece wings are set at 1.6° dihedral and are supported by a pair of v cabane struts and v-struts either side from approx half-span to the lower centre fuselage. Full span leading edge slats extend automatically and full span trailing edge flaps / drooping ailerons can be extended manually by the pilot. The fixed tailwheel undercarriage attaches to the fuselage with long struts and oleo pneumatic shock absorbers.

It was a proof-of-concept design for a 'fool-proof' trainer intended for novice pilots with only one hour of ground instruction, the hour being reduced to five-minutes for those who had already flown gliders, and was intended to be impossible to either stall or spin.

== Operational history ==
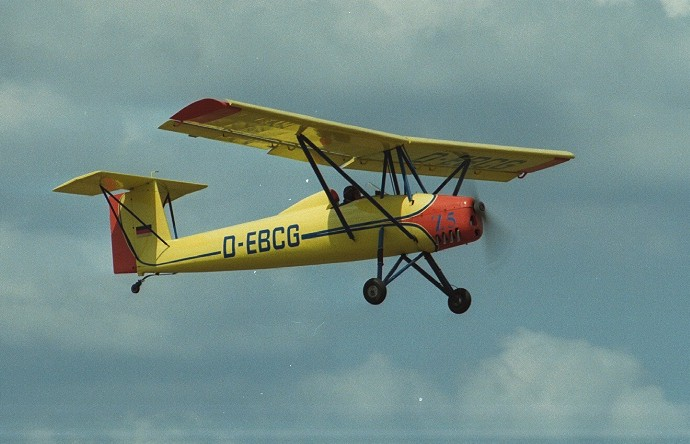
D-EBCG Fly by

The first prototype, the LF-1 V1, was built in 1940 and made its maiden flight, piloted by Winter himself, in December 1940. Test flights stopped in November 1942 after part of the wing ruptured causing the aircraft to crash. In 1943 a second prototype, the V2, was built, receiving the registration D-YBAR. The aircraft was tested for military applications and was once even armed with a Panzerfaust 100 recoilless anti-tank weapon.

At the end of World War II the Zaunkönig registration D-YBAR was taken to the Royal Aircraft Establishment (RAE) at Farnborough for slow flying tests; given the British serial VX190., where amongst others, it was flown by Eric "Winkle" Brown CO Aero Flight, the aircraft also being soloed by the then-head of the RAE Aerodynamics Section, Handel Davies, after half an hour of ground instruction, and whose only previous piloting experience was as a pupil in a dual-control Miles Magister. It was sold to a British private owner in June 1949 as G-ALUA, and then to the Experimental Flying Group and to the Ultra Light Aircraft Association, subsequently in 1974 to an Irish owner, being registered EI-AYU, returning to Germany, in 1976, as D-EBCQ. As of 2008, it was preserved in the Deutsches Museum collection at Oberschleissheim near Munich.

Encouraged by the positive British reviews Prof. Ing. Hermann Winter decided to build a third LF-1. The construction started in 1954 and it was the first new aircraft in Germany after the war to receive a certificate by the Luftfahrt-Bundesamt (LBA) in Braunschweig and the registration D-EBAR. Winter envisioned the Zaunkönig as a People's Aircraft affordable for all (for a price of around DM 6,000).

At the time a fourth LF-1 V4 was already under construction and it flew a few months after the fatal accident with the V3. It received its certificate in 1958 and the registration D-ECER. This aircraft flew for some years in Germany until grounded after the death of Prof. Ing. Winter in 1968. It was restored in 1980 and flew until 1999 as D-EBCG and as of 2008 preserved in the collection of the Internationales Luftfahrtmuseum Manfred Pflumm near Villingen-Schwenningen.

== Specifications (LF-1) ==
Data from Die Deutsche Luftruestung 1933–1945 Vol.4 – Flugzeugtypen MIAG-Zeppelin

General characteristics

- Crew: 1
- Length: 6.08 m (19 ft 11 in)
- Wingspan: 8.02 m (26 ft 4 in)
- Height: 2.38 m (7 ft 10 in)
- Wing area: 8.5 m^{2} (91 sq ft)
- Empty weight: 253 kg (558 lb)
- Gross weight: 370 kg (816 lb)
- Fuel capacity: 40 L (8.80 imp gal; 10.57 US gal) gasoline, 3.5 L (0.77 imp gal; 0.92 US gal) oil
- Powerplant: 1 × Zündapp Z9-092 4-cyl. air-cooled inverted in-line piston engine, 37 kW (50 hp)
- Propellers: 2-bladed wooden fixed pitch propeller, 1.8 m (5 ft 11 in) diameter

Performance

- Maximum speed: 141 km/h (88 mph, 76 kn)
- Cruise speed: 125 km/h (78 mph, 67 kn)
- Landing speed: 46 km/h (29 mph; 25 kn)
- Stall speed: 50 km/h (31 mph, 27 kn)
- Range: 450 km (280 mi, 240 nmi)
- Service ceiling: 3,820 m (12,530 ft)
- Rate of climb: 2.85 m/s (561 ft/min)
- Time to altitude: 1,000 m (3,300 ft) in 6 minutes 42 seconds

Armament
1x Panzerfaust 100 mounted above mainplane centre section

== See also ==
- Tucán T-1
- I.Ae. 31 Colibrí
