= Balkan (factory) =

Bulgarian machine-building company plant

Balkan AD
- Company type: Private
- Industry: Automotive
- Founded: 1938
- Headquarters: Lovech, Bulgaria
- Area served: Bulgaria, North Macedonia, Italy, Romania, Serbia.
- Products: Automobiles

Balkan AD (Bulgarian: „Балкан“ АД) is a private joint-stock, machine-building company plant located in Lovech, Bulgaria, established in 1938. It produced aircraft, automobiles, motorcycles, and bicycles. In December 2021 a new factory was built to start the making of e.GO Mobile cars, with production to start from the beginning of 2023.

In its history, the plant used the following names: State Aircraft Factory (Държавна самолетна фабрика), Bicycle and Motorcycle Plant (Велосипеден и мотоциклетен завод), Light vehicle plant Balkan (Завод за леки автомобили „Балкан“), Balkan United Enterprise (Обединено стопанско предприятие „Балкан“), Balkan United Plants (Обединени заводи „Балкан“), Balkan Machine-Building Plant (Машиностроителен комбинат „Балкан“), Balkan EOOD (Балкан“ ЕООД), Balkan EAD („Балкан“ ЕАД), Balkan AD („Балкан“ АД).

The following vehicles were assembled in the factory:

- Aircraft: Avia, Laz, DAR (1943 - 1954);
- Cars: Balkan 1200, Moskvitch (1966 - 1990), Pirin-Fiat (1966 - 1971); GAZ, Balkan T800 trucks; minibus Rila 700 and Balkan M-10; e.GO Mobile (2023–Present)
- Motorcycles: Balkan 250
- Mopeds: Balkan 50
- Bicycles

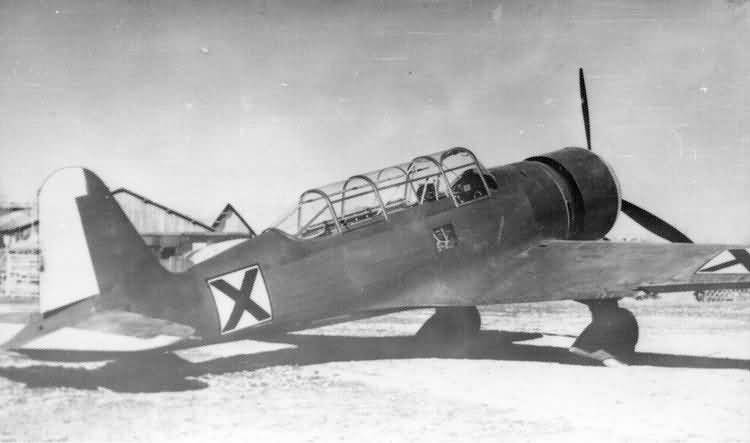
DAR-10 Airplane, 1942

== Since 1941: aircraft ==
When a 20-year restriction imposed by the Neuilly Treaty was lifted in 1938, the Bulgarian army was given the right to own fighter aircraft. The Air Force Command decided to create a modern aircraft factory in which to concentrate the Bulgarian aircraft industry, creating a center outside the capital and developing and manufacturing aircraft in quality and quantity corresponding to the best European models. A special commission selected the site for the factory.

The news of the construction of a plant was not met with enthusiasm in Lovech due to the fact that agricultural land had to be purchased for the construction of the plant. With consistency and perseverance, the mayor convinced the citizens that such a plant will create jobs and will raise the intellectual level of the city. The protocol of the meetings is still kept in the municipality. On July 5, 1939, anti-industry demonstrations were held and were warmly welcomed by the residents of Lovech.

The buildings were designed by Polish engineers who had experience in building similar facilities in Poland. The new aircraft factory was called the State Aircraft Factory (abbreviated DSF)

The following types of aircraft were manufactured:

- DAR-9 Siniger was a trainer aircraft produced in the spring of 1943. In 3 consecutive series, 40 aircraft were built.
- Avia-135, a Czechoslovak fighter - delivered in parts. Some 12 units were put together, tested and handed over to the Air Force.
- DAR-10 was designed as a reconnaissance aircraft. Its development began in DAR, but the prototype was built in DSF. This was a high-speed monoplane, very maneuverable, with secure control, rapidly gaining altitude. Eng. Petko Popganchev, who tested the machine, testified that this aircraft was faster than the Avia-534, but the prototype was destroyed in a crash caused by fog in 1942.
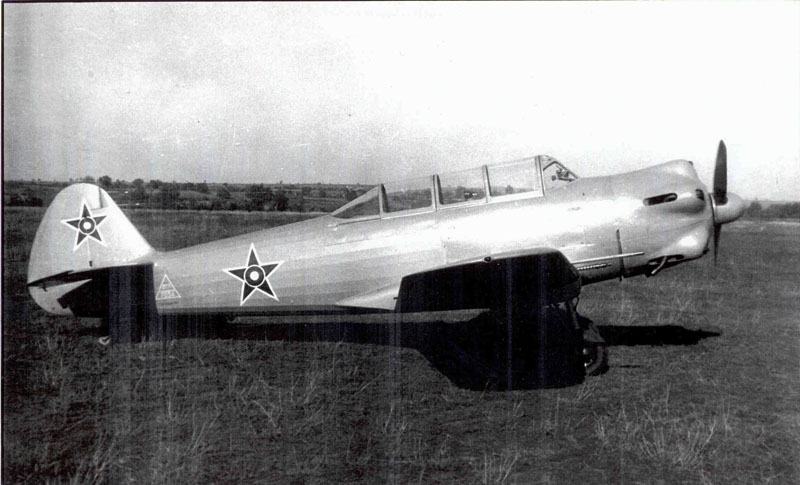
- Laz-7M
  DAR-10F was a development of eng. C. Lazarov. With a Fiat engine, the aircraft had a top speed of 460 km/h and had the qualities of a very good multi-purpose aircraft - for reconnaissance, for assault operations, for bombing (horizontal and with diving), for air combat. The aircraft was tested by eng. Popganchev in March 1945, but this aircraft did not enter serial production.
- Lazarov Laz-7 and Laz-7M were aircraft constructed by eng. Lazarov and his team of designers. It was a monoplane, a bottom-wing designed for training and qualification of navigators and military pilots. This is an extremely successful aircraft and is the most mass-produced aircraft in Bulgaria - 160 pieces of Laz-7 and 150 of Laz-7M.
- Laz-8 was a four-seater monoplane air taxi. Only one prototype was made as a gift from the aircraft constructors at the congress of the Bulgarian Communist Party in 1948.

Shortly after the end of World War II, the State Aircraft Factory in Lovech remained the only plant in the country to produce military aircraft after the Kazanlak Aircraft Factory ceased its production in 1947. In early 1949, the small factory grew into a large plant and was given the name Plant 14. The technician Gancho Lazarov has been appointed head director. Simultaneously, with the activity of the plant, there was training of aeronautical engineers at the Technical university in Sofia in progress, and lasted until 1954.

In 1954, COMECON made the decision to close the aircraft industry in Bulgaria. As a result, many of the young specialists, engineers, technicians and well-trained workers in Plant 14, who chose to dedicate their lives to aviation, were put in an almost hopeless situation. Among them was eng. Dimitar Damyanov, who started working in Lovech as an aeronautical engineer in the early 1950s.

== From 1954: New products ==
After the closure of the aircraft industry, the name and the production nomenclature of the enterprise were changed several times. It was named the Bicycle and Motorcycle Plant, the Balkan Automobile Plant, the Balkan United Enterprise, the Balkan United Plants, and the Balkan Machine-Building Plant.

The initial restructuring of the plant after 1954 was associated with the short-term introduction of completely atypical production. Then the management of the former aviation factory proved its strength and came out of the crisis situation on its own initiative, which was proposed to the higher authorities. They offered to start mass production of cars and motorcycles in Lovech, for which the factory has had the necessary machinery and highly qualified specialists.

Since 1965, the plant has been called Balkan. It consisted of 6 other plants - a plant for cars, a plant for two-wheeled vehicles, a plant for mechanical products, a plant for plastics and rubber and a tool factory. Since 1971, as part of DSO "Balkancar" (Balkancar) produced parts for electric and forklift production in Bulgaria.

=== Cars ===
Towards the end of the 1950s, in an atmosphere of high technical professionalism, which was prevalent at the time in Bulgaria, the idea of developing a Bulgarian car was born. The goal was to eventually develop a prestigious production, forming the main profile of the former aircraft factory.

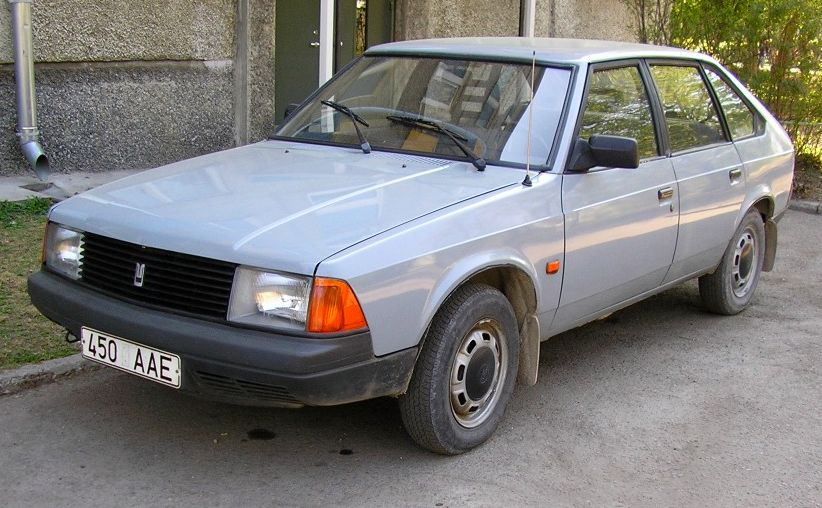
Moskvich Aleko, model 2141s

Preliminary preparations for the first prototype of a car began in late 1958. At the same time in the yard of the factory there was a Volkswagen car kept, of which the engine and chassis were used as a model. The process of preliminary preparation also included specialists from Plant 12 in Sofia, who managed to make an identical copy of the original engine provided to them (after 1956 the production of all engines for Balkan motorcycles was assigned to Plant 12).

The team of eng. Damyanov, which at that time included Yuli Kostov, eng. Kancho Kanchev, eng. Ivan Petrov (Deputy Chief Engineer), Georgi Filipov, Peycho Peychev, Georgi Lazarov and several otherswas tasked to shape the body. The forging of the individual components of the sheet metal bodies was done entirely by hand, with the help of wooden hammers on leather cushions filled with sand.

What especially complicated the work of the team was the so-called "geometric development", which was drawn on a huge board on a scale of 1:1. It is from here that all the measures for making templates, from which the details of the wooden model are made, are subsequently removed. The last stage of the work is related to the cutting of the wooden model into separate parts, from which the metal stamps for the external forms of the body are cast. The person in charge of making the models was Marin Radev, and Georgi Lazarov was in charge of forging the individual external elements.

=== Pickups and vans ===
In parallel with the car, a prototype of a light truck based on the Volkswagen Transporter was made. The design of the prototype was almost identical to the original. In September 1960, models of cars and a pickup trucks were exhibited in an open area on the International Fair in Plovdiv, with a "Made in Bulgaria" sign. In the spring of 1962 in Lovech the issue of the possible production of a light truck was again discussed. In March of the same year, the team of eng. Damyanov began preliminary preparations for this task, and the initial group included Ivan Savov, Vasil Valev, Bogdan Hambardjiev and Eng. Lyubomir Toshev, who took over the main work on the suspension. The goal is to complete the prototypes of a light truck and a minibus with an identical front part within 6 months, which will be presented at the jubilee 20th consecutive sample fair in Plovdiv.

In 1962, the efforts of the design department were focused on the creation of a light truck with a payload of 800 kg and a minibus with 7+1 and 11 seats on the basis of the Soviet cars Volga and Moskvich. The pickup was made entirely in Lovech, but for the body of the 11-seater minibus a working visit was made to the bus plant Chavdar, Botevgrad, which was then the only specialized company for the production of bus bodies.

A model of a minibus and a light truck was shown in Plovdiv in September 1962 under the name Balkan T800, and their presentation was a huge success, supported by several enthusiastic articles in Bulgarian and foreign specialized publications. In April 1963, a zero series of 3 trucks was completed, whose loading platform was made of wood, unlike the first prototype, in which it was made of metal. The trucks passed the tests successfully and the proposed plan for serial production of Balkan T800 was approved. Just then, however, an unexpected problem arose - it turned out that the USSR could not produce enough sets of chassis and engines (at that time Moskvich was still the only mass private car in the USSR), and the limited production capacity of the plant wouldn't be able to cover the needs of the local market.

Nevertheless, the design work continued and in 1965 the plant presented a model of a new, more modern version of the minibus, and in 1966 - a van on a scale of 1:5, of which the exterior design was assigned to eng. Petko Mishev from the center for industrial aesthetics and artistic design (CPEHP), which after 1964 developed the design of almost all motorcycles Balkan.

In 1967, the Plovdiv Fair showed the prototype of the Rila 700 - a minibus based on the Moskvich 408, whose body was designed by Hristo Hristov - who was among the prominent architects in Lovech. The last series of models of the Rila minibus were proposed in 1970 by Petko Mishev and Emil Ivanov (among the leading vehicle designers at the center), but they also did not receive the necessary approval from the relevant authorities, thus working on a prototype Bulgarian minibus has been discontinued.

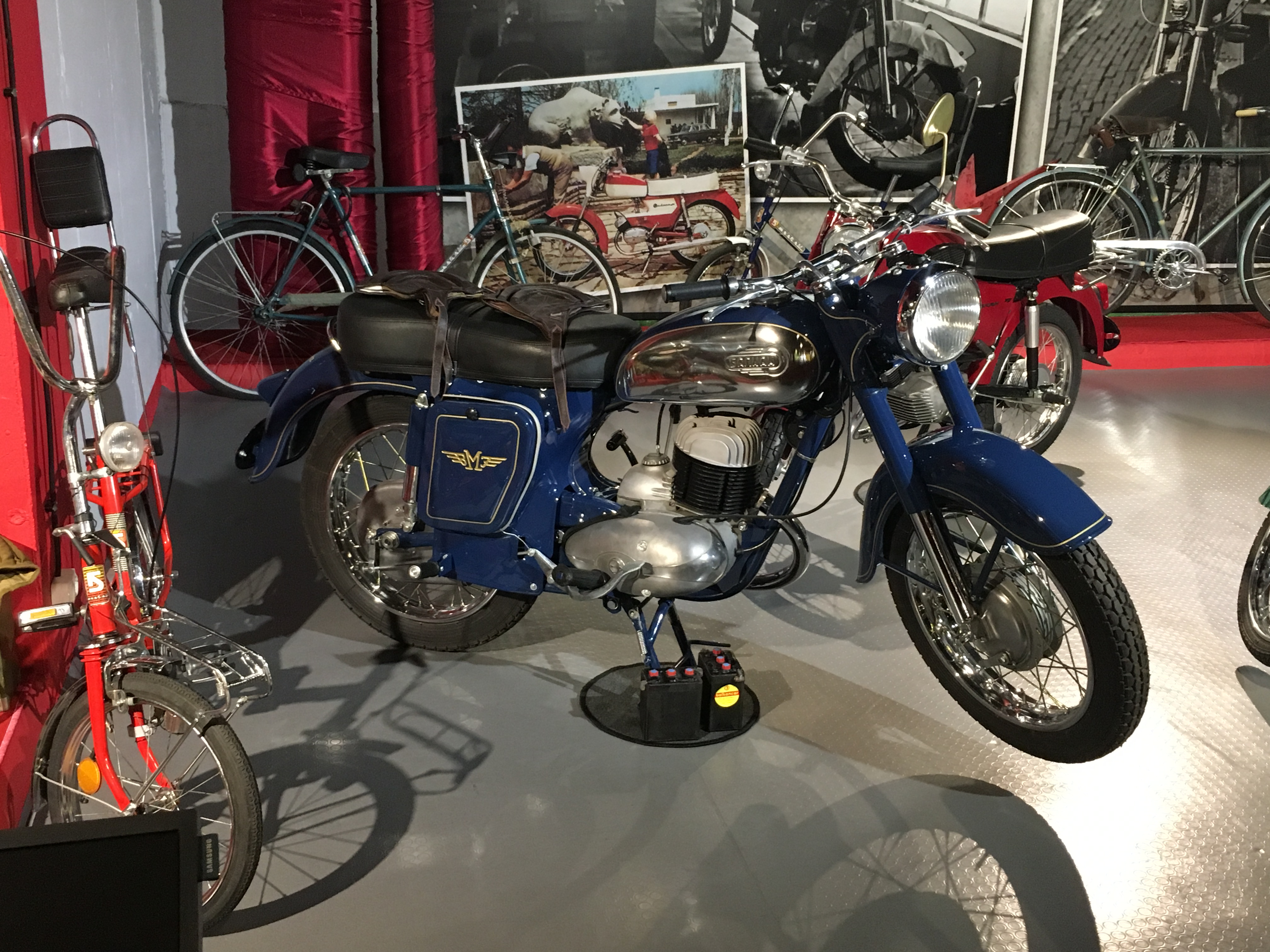
Balkan 250 S2 motorcycle

=== Motorcycles and bicycles ===
The project manager was Dimitar Damyanov. The first prototype of a motorcycle called the Balkan M1 was presented at the 17th International Fair in Plovdiv in 1956. Production began in 1957, and by the end of that year, the first 100 pieces were made. The engines were made in Plant 12, Sofia. Motorcycles with 250 cm³ engine displacement were produced until 1971.

In 1961, Plant 14 started producing mopeds of 50 cc engine capacity, the production of these lasted until 1975.

From 1971 to 1975 there was also a 75 cc version of the moped produced.

== From 1990 ==
Balkan was transformed with the state as a sole proprietor into a sole proprietorship with limited liability in 1995 and into a sole proprietorship joint stock company in 1996. The main activity of Balkan AD is the production of forklifts and bicycles, hydrodynamic transmitters, drive axles, spare parts.

The company was privatized in the first wave of mass privatization in 1995–1997. Balkan is a private joint stock company with 100 employees since 1997. Napredak Holding owns 44% of the capital by 2011.
