= State Aircraft Factory (Bulgaria) =

Factory in Lovech, Bulgaria that operated from 1938–1954

- Native name: Drzhavna Samoletna Fabrika
- Industry: Aerospace
- Founded: 1938
- Defunct: 1954
- Fate: Closed
- Successor: Balkan
- Headquarters: Lovech, Bulgaria
- Key people: Tsvetan Lazarov

State Plane Factory (Bulgarian: Държавна самолетна фабрика) was established in 1938 and operated until 1954 in Lovech.

== History ==
The buildings of the factory were constructed from Polish engineers. In the first years in the factory worked around 50 years. Chief engineer is Dimitar Atanasov, chief of the engineering department – engineer Konstantin Boshnakov, constructors – Boris Bonchev, Anton Daskalov, Peter Hristanov, Dimitar Manolov, Vladimir Vlahov.

== Products ==
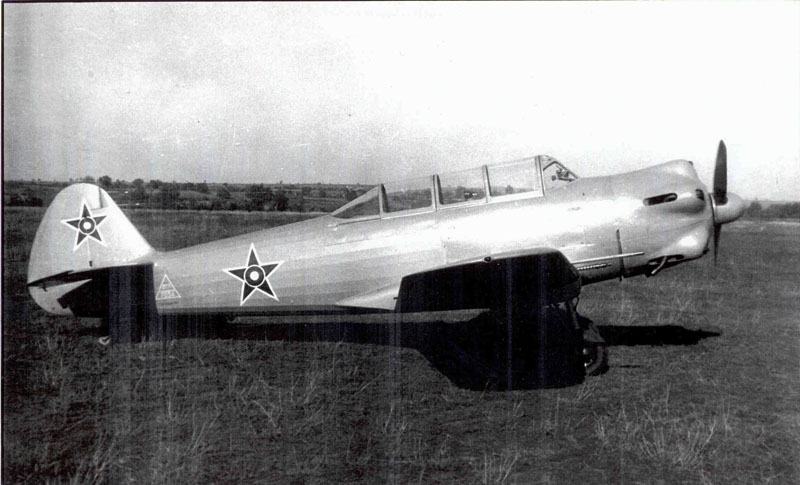
LAZ-7

| Model name | First flight | Number built | Type |
|---|---|---|---|
| DAR 9 Siniger | | 54 (Note: An additional 6 airframes were built by DAR.) | Single engine biplane trainer |
| DAR-10 | 1941 | 2 | Single engine monoplane light bomber |
| LAZ-7 | 1948 | | |
| LAZ-8 | | 1 | |

== See also ==
- Darzhavna Aeroplanna Rabotilnitsa
