= B35 =

B35 may refer to:

== Aircraft ==
- Beechcraft Model 35 Bonanza, 1950 version
- Northrop YB-35, an experimental aircraft
- Avia B-35, a Czechoslovak aircraft

== Roads ==
- Bundesstraße 35, a German road
- B-35 (Michigan county highway), United States
- B35 road in County Tyrone, Northern Ireland; see List of B roads in Northern Ireland

== Other ==
- B35 (New York City bus) in Brooklyn
- HLA-B35, an HLA-B serotype
