= State Aircraft Factory =

State Aircraft Factory can refer to:

- State Aircraft Factory (Bulgaria), DSF
- State Aircraft Factory (Greece), better known through its Greek acronym KEA
- Valtion lentokonetehdas of Finland
