= Lazarov Laz-7 =

Laz-7
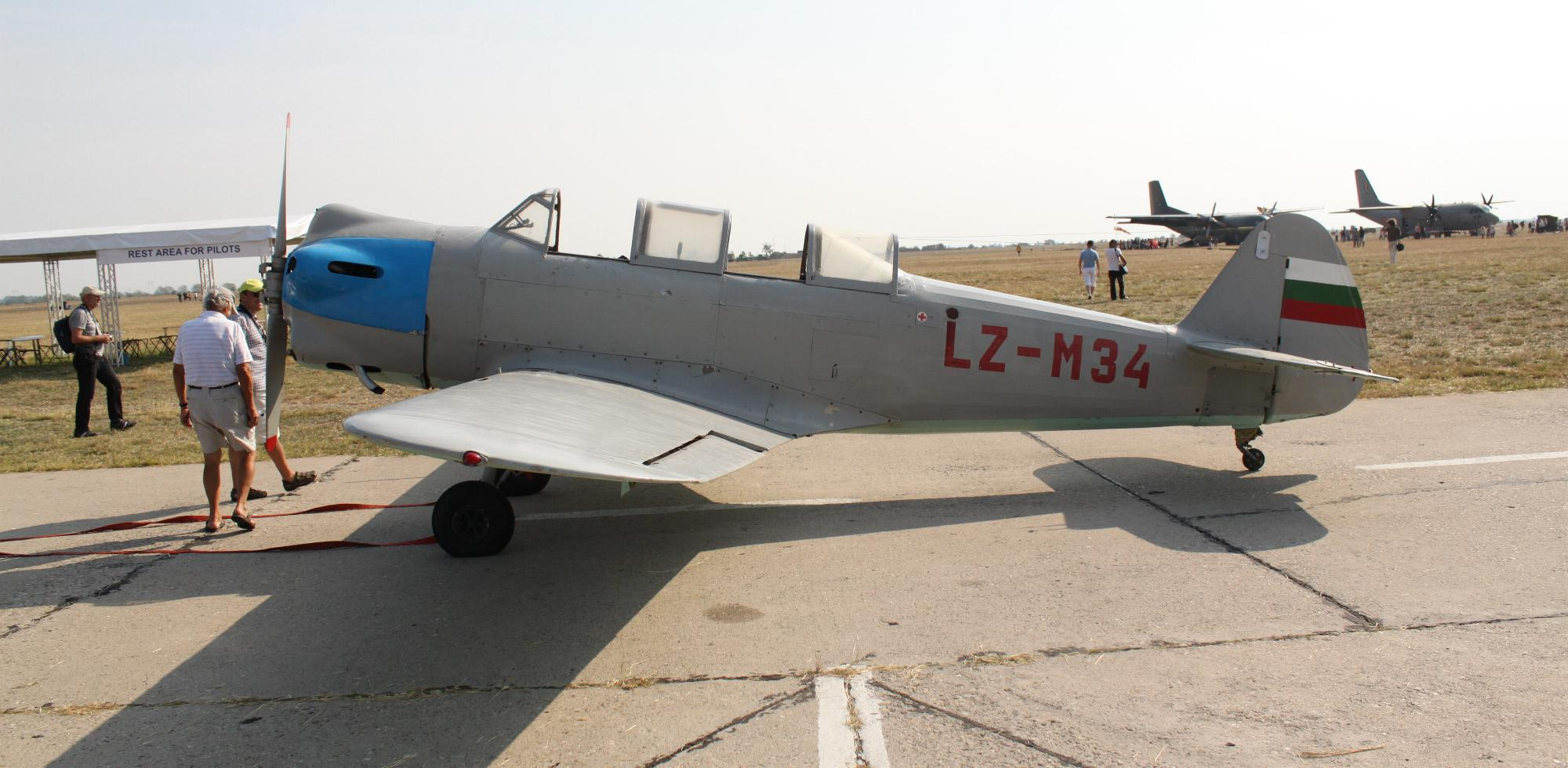
- Laz-7M/ZAK-1

General information
- Type: Trainer
- National origin: Bulgaria
- Primary user: Bulgarian Air Force
- Number built: 3 prototypes 160 Laz-7; 150 Laz-7M; 1 Laz-8

History
- Manufactured: 1949–1952
- First flight: 12 June 1948

The Lazarov Laz-7 was a Bulgarian training aircraft of the 1940s and 50s. The first of three prototypes flew on 12 June 1948, and was followed by 160 production aircraft powered by a Czechoslovak Walter Minor 6-III inline engine built from 1949 to 1952, and 150 Laz-7Ms (also known as the Zak-1) powered by a Soviet Shvetsov M-11FR radial engine from 1952 to 1954. A single example of a four-seat light transport derivative, the Laz-8, was built in 1949. The Laz-7 and Laz-7M were used by the Bulgarian Air Force as a trainer and light bomber, and surplus examples were later transferred to flying clubs, were they remained in use until the late 1960s.

== Design and development ==
In April 1946, Yugoslavia issued a specification for an elementary training aircraft for the Yugoslav Air Force and civil training with aero clubs. On learning of the specification, Tsvetan Lazarov, chief designer of the Bulgarian State Aircraft Factory ((Bulgarian: Държавна самолетна фабрика (Darzhavna Samoletna Fabrika (DSF)), decided to prepare a design to meet this requirement, and he obtained agreement from the management of the factory and the Bulgarian Air Force to do so, setting up a team of designers to work on the new aircraft. (Note: Lazerov was responsible for the design of the DAR 10 light bomber during the Second World War.) The new design, the Laz-7, was submitted to the Yugoslav authorities in June 1946 for evaluation, and in August that year, it was placed second behind the Yugoslav Ikarus Aero 2, and an order was placed for two prototypes to be delivered to Yugoslavia for testing.

The first prototype (known as the Laz-7.1) made its maiden flight at DSF's Lovech factory on 12 June 1948. It was a low wing cantilever monoplane of mixed wood and metal construction. It has wooden wings, with the fuselage having a steel tube structure, with plywood and fabric covering. The crew of two sat under an enclosed canopy. A fixed tailwheel undercarriage was fitted. The aircraft was powered by a single Walter Minor 6-III six-cylinder air-cooled inline engine, rated at 118 kW (158 hp) and driving a two bladed propeller. Factory tests of the first prototype continued into August 1948, after which it was delivered in Yugoslavia. It was later destroyed in a crash caused by a structural failure of its wing. A second prototype, the Laz-7.2, flew in June 1949 and differed in having a cut-down rear fuselage and more extensive plywood skinning.

Bulgaria had an urgent requirement for training aircraft, needing to train replacements for the large numbers of pilots who had been dismissed for political unreliability since the end of the Second World War, and with an ageing training fleet, and the Bulgarian Air Force decided to adopt the Laz-7 to meet its needs. A third prototype, the Laz-7.3, was built to reflect Bulgarian requirements and experience from the first two prototypes, and flew in September 1949. This had a modified wing structure, and was fitted with a retractable undercarriage, with the mainwheels retracting rearwards. The positions of the student and instructor were swapped, with the instructor moving to the front seat and the student (or observer) taking the rear seat. The Laz-7.3 was armed, with two 7.92 mm machine guns in the wings and provision for a third, flexibly mounted gun for the observer. Bombs could be carried under the aircraft's wings.

In order to speed deliveries, early production batches used the wing structure and fixed undercarriage of the Laz-7.02, with later batches using the intended retractable undercarriage. From the fifth production batch, stronger wing spars were fitted. As production progressed, batches varied in the armament fitted, with either T6-200 machine guns (Note: The German MG-15 machine gun.) or Czechoslovak vz.30 machine guns (Note: These were improved Czech derivatives of the Vickers Class E aircraft machine guns, themselves an export version of the Vickers Machine Gun.) fitted. The aircraft were delivered in two main armament configurations - the 'A' configuration with a machine gun in the rear cockpit and bomb racks, and the 'B' configuration, with only the wing-mounted guns. In total, 160 Walter-powered Laz-7s were built by Zavod 14 between 1949 and 1951. (Note: The DSF had been renamed Zavod 14 early in 1949.)

In 1952, with the overloaded Walter engine suffering crankshaft failures in service, it was decided to adapt the Laz-7 to use the more powerful (125 kW (168 hp)) Soviet Shvetsov M-11FR radial engine, and a Laz-7 was retrofitted with the new engine to serve as a prototype, with these tests proving successful, and the re-engined aircraft was recommended for production as the Laz-7M. The Laz-7M, which was also known as the ZAK-1, had a revised structure, which was both lighter and stronger, and was fitted with Soviet equipment and instruments. They were largely delivered in 'B' configuration, and were armed with vz.30 machine guns. A total of 150 Laz-7M/ZAK-1s were built, together with 40 additional sets of wings for refitting to older Laz-7s. The last examples were completed in 1954. The Laz-7M, with its five-cylinder M-11FR engine enclosed by a helmeted cowling, closely resembled the similarly powered early Yakovlev Yak-18.

In October 1948, the Bulgarian Air Force ordered Lazarov and his team to build a four-seat passenger derivative of the Laz-7, to be ready for 1 May 1949 and the 5th Congress of the Bulgarian Communist Party. The resulting aircraft, the Laz-8, was based on the Laz-7.01, and was powered by the Walter Minor 6-III engine and had a fixed undercarriage, but had a revised fuselage with two rows of two seats. Work on the Laz-7 was slowed to meet the deadline for delivery of the Laz-8, which made its first flight on 24 April 1949. The Laz-8, after being rebuilt as a three seater, served with the VIP flight of the Bulgarian Air Force, remaining in use until 1958.

== Operational history ==
Examples from the first batch of Laz-7s were evaluated at the Peoples Air School of the Bulgarian Air Force in 1949, and the type entered full service as a trainer in 1950. The type was also used as a light attack aircraft, equipping the Bulgarian Air Force's night light bomber regiments. From 1958, about 120 Laz-7s and Laz-7Ms were disarmed and transferred to aero clubs of the Bulgarian paramilitary organisation DOSO, where they were used for navigation training and glider tugs, remaining in use until the late 1960s. The Lazarov Laz-7 and Laz-7M were the last aircraft mass-produced in Bulgaria for many years, (Note: The Laz-7 is sometimes described as also being the first mass-produced aircraft of entirely Bulgarian design, but the DAR 8 trainer of 1935 (12 built) was the first Bulgarian-designed aircraft to be serially produced.) with all aeronautical production in Bulgaria being stopped in 1954 at the orders of COMECON.

== Variants ==
Laz-7
Elementary training / light attack aircraft, powered by Walter Minor 6-III engine. 160 built.
Laz-7M
Revised training version, powered by Shvetsov M-11FR engine. 150 built.
Laz-8
Four-seat light transport liaison derivative of Laz-7, powered by Walter Minor 6-III. One built.

== Surviving aircraft ==
- Two ZAK-1s are preserved at the Plovdiv Aviation Museum.
- One Laz-7 is on display outside the headquarters of the Bulgarian Air Force at Sofia.

== Specifications (Zak-1) ==
Data from Monografie: Lazerov Laz-7: Část II

General characteristics

- Crew: 2
- Length: 7.80 m (25 ft 7 in)
- Wingspan: 10.60 m (34 ft 9 in)
- Height: 2.30 m (7 ft 7 in)
- Wing area: 16.40 m^{2} (176.5 sq ft)
- Empty weight: 770 kg (1,698 lb)
- Max takeoff weight: 1,261 kg (2,780 lb)
- Fuel capacity: 152 L (40 US gal; 33 imp gal)
- Powerplant: 1 × Shvetsov M-11FR 5-cylinder air-cooled radial engine, 125 kW (168 hp)

Performance

- Maximum speed: 212 km/h (132 mph, 114 kn)
- Range: 675 km (419 mi, 364 nmi)
- Service ceiling: 5,500 m (18,000 ft)

Armament

- Guns: 2× 7.92 mm vz.30 machine guns
- Bombs: 200 kg (440 lb)
