= DAR 3 =

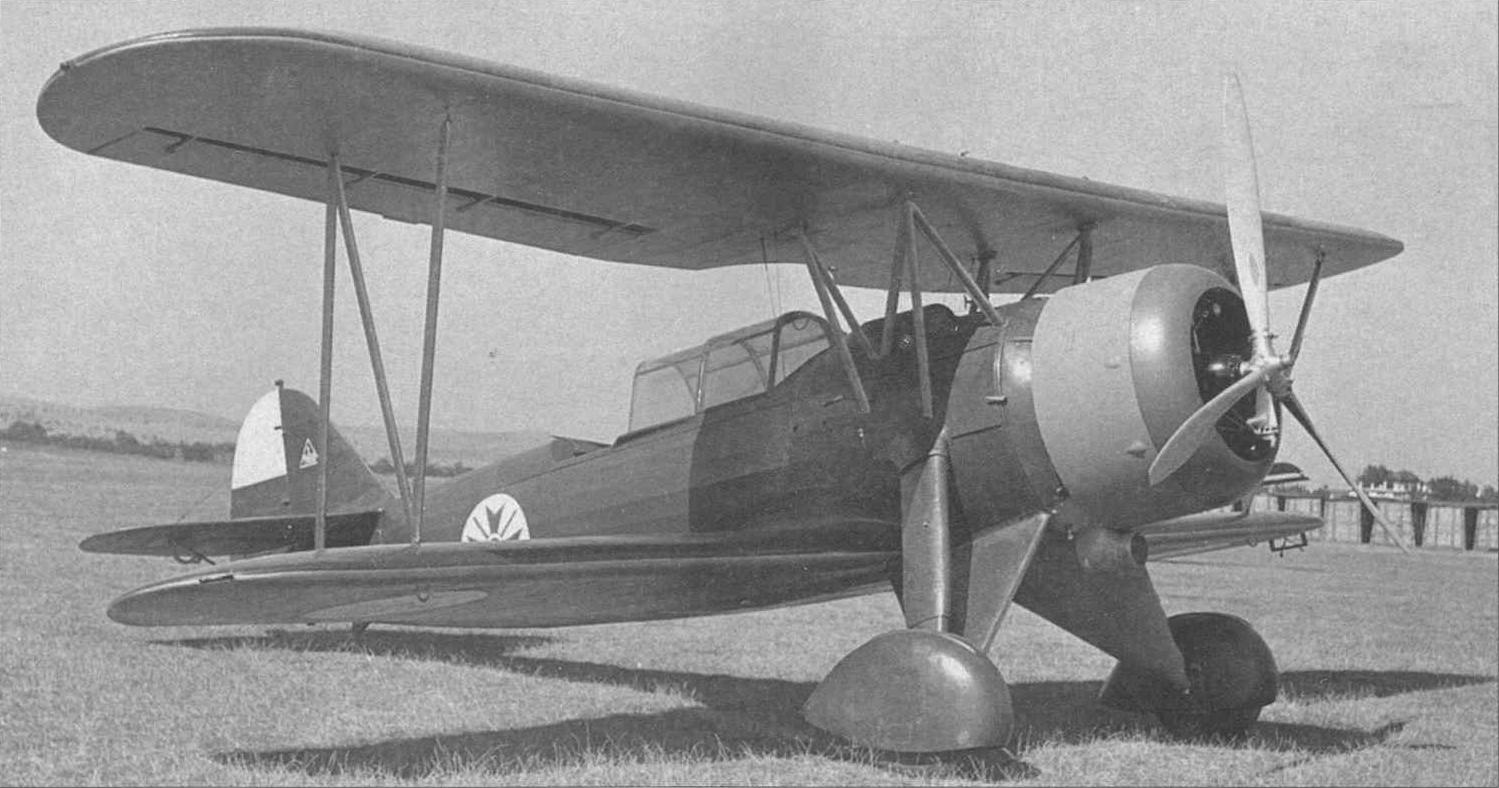
- DAR 3 Garvan-III aircraft powered by one Alfa Romeo 126 RC34 engine.

General information
- Type: Reconnaissance and auxiliary aircraft
- National origin: Bulgaria
- Manufacturer: Drjavna Aeroplane Rаbotilnitsa
- Designer: Tsvetan Lazarov
- Issued by: Royal Bulgarian Air Force
- Primary user: Bulgarian Air Force
- Number built: 2 (Prototypes); 6 (Garvan-I); 6 (Garvan-II); 12 (Garvan-III)

History
- First flight: November 1926

The DAR 3 Garvan ('Raven' or 'Laz-3') was a 1930s Bulgarian single-engine, multipurpose reconnaissance and auxiliary aircraft.

== Design and development ==
The aircraft was a multipurpose close air support biplane developed by the Drjavna Aeroplane Rаbotilnitsa. It was intended to be a short-range reconnaissance/light bomber. The first prototype was powered by a 400 hp (298 kW) Lorraine-Dietrich 12D engine. During its early stages, the DAR 3(I) prototype suffered various modifications. Its maiden flight occurred in 1927 and it was delivered in 1928. In 1930 it was fitted with a Gnome et Rhône Jupiter 9Akx radial engine. The second prototype came shortly after: the first prototype's rudder and fin were enlarged and its undercarriage was revised. A second aircraft known as the DAR 3(I bis.), referred to as the third prototype, was built. It featured an American Wright Cyclone engine and triangular pointed fin and was delivered in 1929.

== Operational history ==
During the 1930s and 1940s, the DAR 3 was used for reconnaissance, army co-operation, liaison and continuation training. The DAR 3 also saw action over the Balkans in 1944. After the crash of two Garvan-III aircraft, the Bulgarian Air Force handed the 10 remaining planes to the Yugoslavian Air Force.

== Variants ==
DAR 3(I)
First and second prototypes.
DAR 3(I bis.)
Third prototype modified with Wright Cyclone engine and triangular pointed fin.
DAR 3 Garvan-I

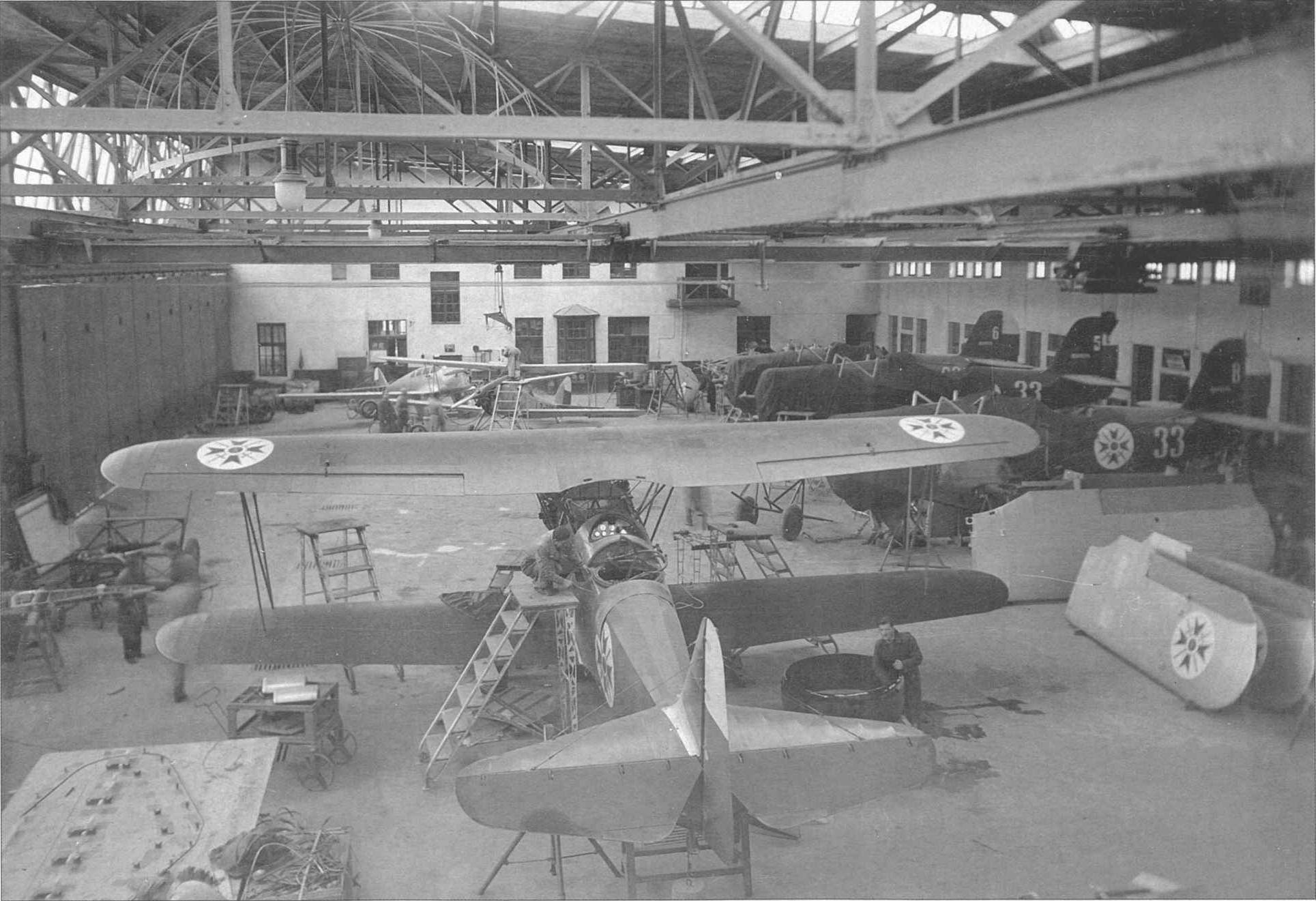
A Bulgarian DAR-3 Garvan-1 (in the forefront) and a DAR-7ss.1 (to the rear) sharing the Bojurishte maintenance shop with a German Heinkel HE-45b Shturkel in 1936.

Series 1 aircraft with open cockpit and one Wright Cyclone engine in a Townsend ring.
DAR 3 Garvan-II
Series 2 aircraft with open cockpit, wheel spats and one Siemens Jupiter VI engine, which was later retrofitted with the Alfa Romeo 126 RC34 engine and a hooded cockpit.
DAR 3 Garvan-III
Series 3 aircraft powered by one Alfa Romeo 126 RC34 engine in longer cowling. Featured a cockpit canopy for the pilot but not for the gunner and a lengthened fuselage.

== Operators ==
Bulgaria

- Bulgarian Air Force

Yugoslavia

- Yugoslavian Air Force

== Specifications (DAR 3 Garvan-III) ==
Data from Coletti's Combat Aircraft, Nevington War Museum

General characteristics

- Crew: two (pilot, gunner)
- Length: 9.46 m (31 ft 0 in)
- Upper wingspan: 11.9 m (39 ft 1 in)
- Lower wingspan: 10.75 m (35 ft 3 in)
- Wing area: 37 m^{2} (400 sq ft)
- Empty weight: 1,300 kg (2,866 lb)
- Gross weight: 2,100 kg (4,630 lb)
- Powerplant: 1 × Alfa Romeo 126 RC34 7 cylinders, 560 kW (750 hp)

Performance

- Maximum speed: 265 km/h (165 mph, 143 kn)
- Cruise speed: 243 km/h (151 mph, 131 kn)
- Range: 1,000 km (620 mi, 540 nmi)
- Service ceiling: 7,000 m (23,000 ft)

Armament

- Guns: 1 x 7.92mm machine gun in the bow for the pilot and 1 x 7.92mm machine gun in the cockpit for the observer
- Bombs: Up to 200 kg
