= Darzhavna Aeroplanna Rabotilnitsa =

State Aircraft Workshops
- Native name: Darzhavna Aeroplanna Rabotilnitsa
- Industry: Aerospace
- Founded: 1924
- Headquarters: Bozhurishte, Sofia, Bulgaria
- Key people: Tsvetan Lazarov; Kiril Petkov

Darzhavna aeroplanna rabotilnitsa (Държавна аеропланна работилница - State Aircraft Workshops), abbreviated DAR (ДАР), was the first Bulgarian aircraft manufacturer, established in 1924 at Bojourishte.

== History ==
Initially involved in repairing German aircraft then in use in Bulgaria, DAR soon began producing copies of some of these (DAR Uzunov-1, DAR 2), before moving on to licensed production of the Focke-Wulf Fw 44. The workshops produced a number of original designs, some of these were produced (DAR 1, DAR 3, DAR 4, DAR 6, DAR 8, DAR 9, DAR 11), while others never proceeded past prototype stage (DAR 5, DAR 7, DAR 10).

Although aircraft manufacture was moved to the Darzhavna Samoletna Fabrika (Държавна самолетна фабрика - State Airplane Factory, abbr. ДСФ - DSF) in Lovech in 1940, designers remained in DAR. Tsvetan Lazarov was DAR's head designer towards the end of the organisation's lifespan. Amongst others, he was responsible for its final design, the DAR 11 fighter of 1941 that never left the drawing board. DAR was closed after 1945 and the personnel and facilities were moved to the DSF in Lovech.

Although not direct legal successor, in 1995 a newly established private company called Aeroplani DAR based its name and heritage on DAR.

== Products ==
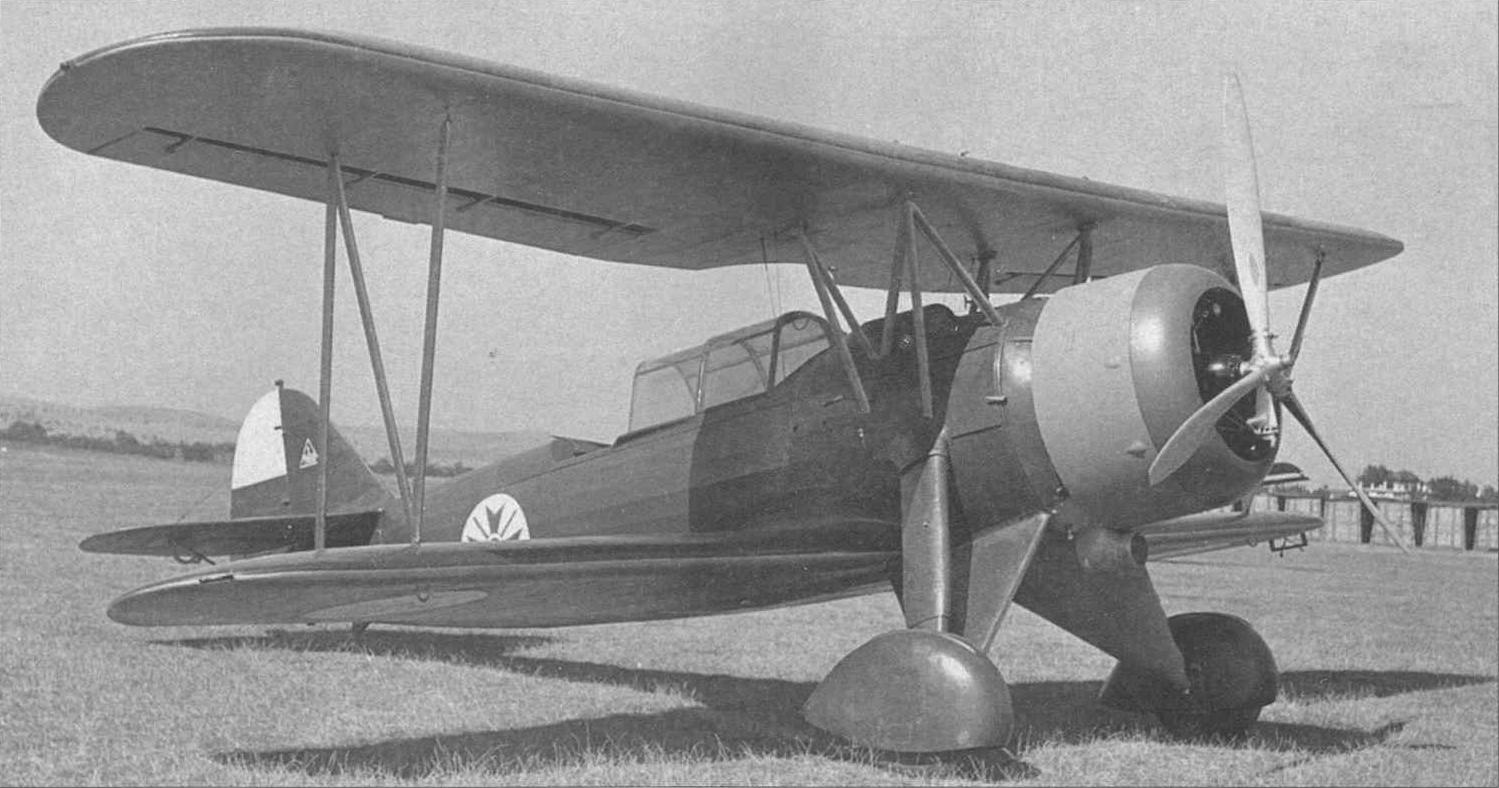
DAR-3 Garvan III

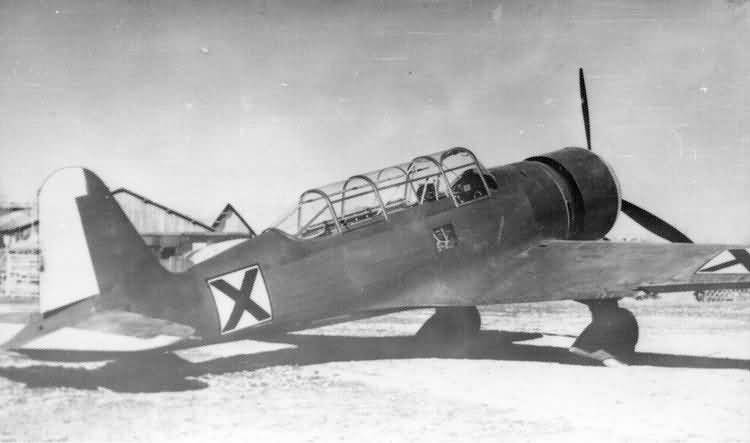
DAR-10

Model name	First flight	Number built	Type
DAR Uzunov-1	1925	7	License built single engine biplane reconnaissance airplane
DAR 1 Peperuda	1926	20	Single engine biplane trainer
DAR 2		12	License built single engine biplane reconnaissance airplane
DAR 3 Garvan	1926	26	Single engine biplane reconnaissance airplane
DAR 4	1930	1	Three engine biplane airliner
DAR 5 Brambar	1930	1	
DAR 6	1932	6 (Note: An additional 36 airframes were built by DSF.)	Single engine biplane trainer
DAR 7		1	
DAR 8 Slavei		12	Single engine biplane trainer
DAR 9 Siniger		6 (Note: An additional 54 airframes were built by DSF.)	Single engine biplane trainer
DAR 10 Bekas	1941	2	Single engine monoplane light bomber
DAR 11 Lyastovitsa	N/A	0	Unbuilt license built single engine monoplane fighter

== See also ==
- State Aircraft Factory (Bulgaria)
