= Avia B.35 =

Fighter aircraft

B-35
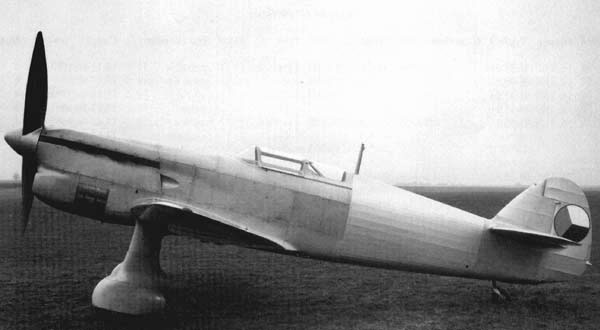

General information
- Type: Fighter
- Manufacturer: Avia
- Designer: František Novotný
- Number built: 3

History
- First flight: 28 September 1938

The Avia B-35 was a fighter aircraft built in Czechoslovakia shortly before World War II.

== Design and development ==
The B.35 was designed to meet a 1935 requirement by the Czechoslovak Air Force for a replacement for their B-534 fighter biplanes. The B.35 was an elegant, low-wing monoplane with an elliptical wing. The fuselage was constructed from welded steel tube, covered in metal ahead of and including the cockpit and fabric aft of the cockpit, while the wing was of entirely wooden construction. Rather anachronistically, the Air Force specified a fixed tailwheel undercarriage for the aircraft, in the hope that this would speed development, as the mechanism for retracting the undercarriage was not yet available.

The first prototype, the B-35/1, displayed excellent flying characteristics and high speed and was originally powered by a Hispano-Suiza 12Ydrs piston engine. The powerplant was later changed to a 12Ycrs with an identical power output, but with provision for an autocannon to be fitted between the cylinder banks to fire through the propeller hub. Testing continued until 22 November 1938, when the aircraft was destroyed in a crash that killed the Military Technical and Aeronautical Institute test pilot Arnošt Kavalec. Nevertheless, a second prototype, B-35/2, was already reaching completion, and was fitted with redesigned ailerons and flaps. It first flew on 30 December with testing beginning in earnest in February 1939. A preproduction series of ten aircraft was ordered, but before these could be built, Czechoslovakia was occupied by Germany in March 1939.

Development however was resumed under German control, with the substantially revised B.35/3 flying in August 1939. The elliptical leading edges of the wings had been replaced with straight ones, and an outward-retracting main undercarriage was fitted. This prototype was the first to actually carry its intended armament. With German markings and the registration D-IBPP, it was displayed at the Salon de l'Aéronautique in Brussels, where enough interest was generated to spur development of an improved version of the aircraft as the B.135.

== Variants ==
- B-35/1: First prototype.
- B-35/2: Second prototype.
- B-35/3: Third prototype.

== Specifications (B.35/1) ==
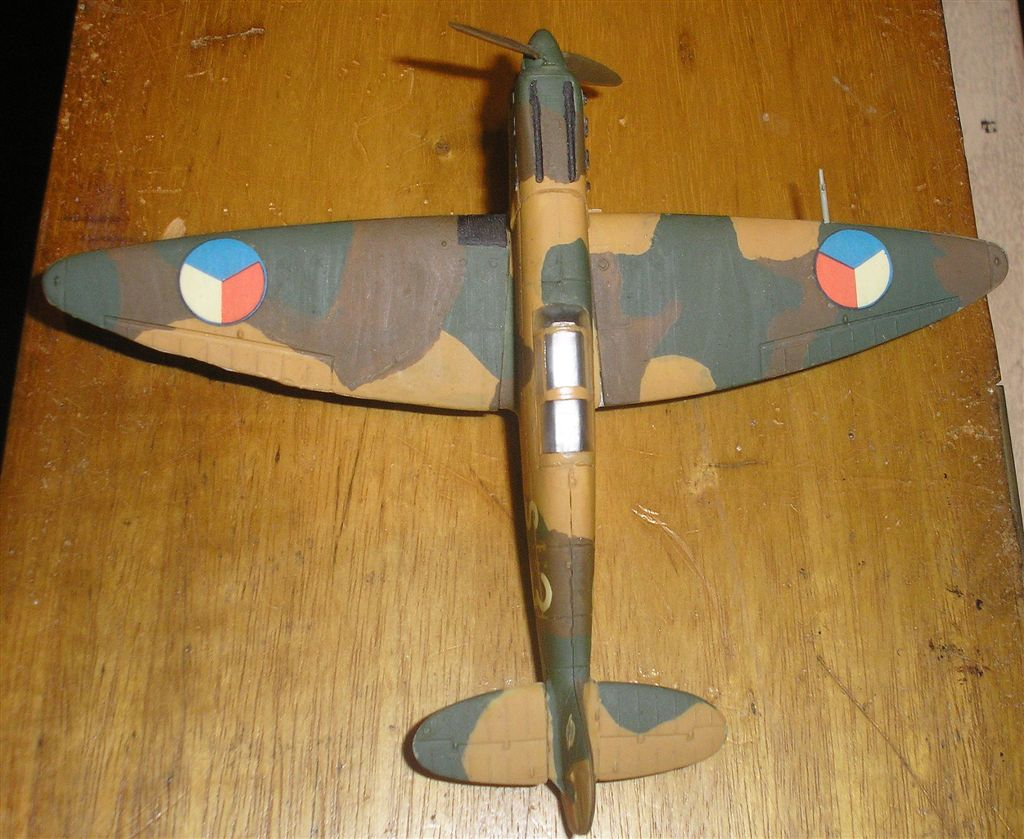
Scale model, showing the original elliptical wing of the B.35

General characteristics

- Crew: one pilot
- Length: 8.50 m (27 ft 11 in)
- Wingspan: 10.85 m (35 ft 7 in)
- Height: 2.60 m (8 ft 6 in)
- Wing area: 17.00 m^{2} (183 sq ft)
- Empty weight: 1,690 kg (3,726 lb)
- Gross weight: 2,200 kg (4,850 lb)
- Powerplant: 1 × Hispano-Suiza 12Ycrs Twelve-cylinder supercharged liquid-cooled 60° V12 engine , 640 kW (860 hp)

Performance

- Maximum speed: 495 km/h (308 mph, 268 kn)
- Range: 500 km (311 mi, 270 nmi)
- Rate of climb: 13.0 m/s (2,560 ft/min)
- Wing loading: 129.41 kg/m^{2} (26.50 lb/sq ft)

== See also ==
Related development

- Avia B-135

Aircraft of comparable role, configuration, and era

- Fokker D.XXI
