= DAR 4 =

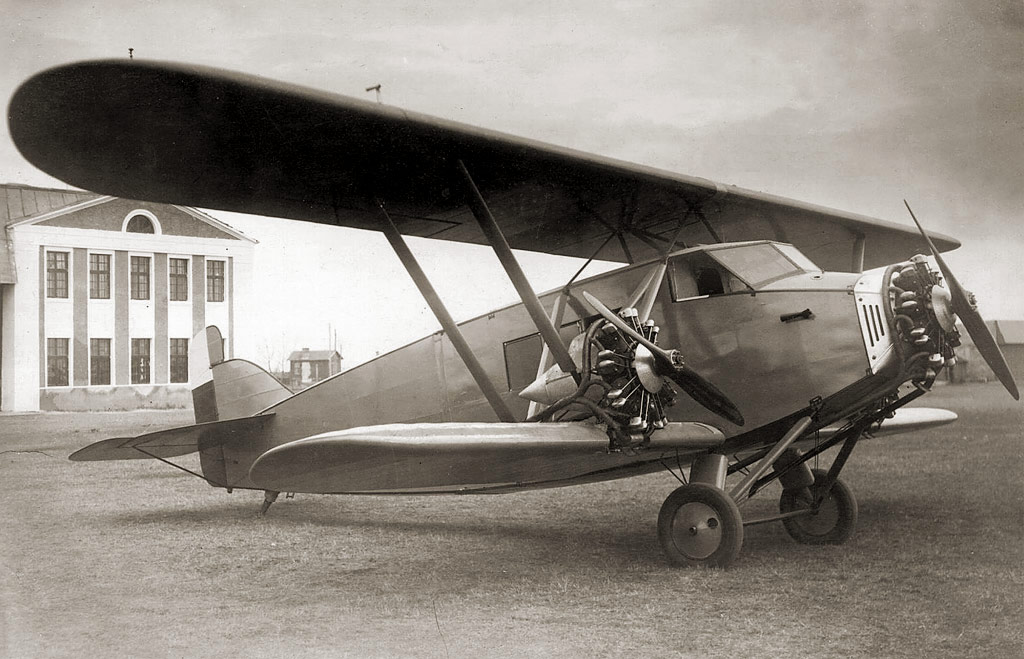

General information
- Type: Airliner
- Manufacturer: DAR
- Number built: 1

History
- First flight: 1930

The DAR 4 was a prototype airliner built in Bulgaria in 1930.

== Design and development ==
The DAR 4 was a conventional biplane design, with unstaggered wings of unequal span braced with Warren trusses. The fuselage offered fully enclosed accommodation for the two pilots and four passengers. A curious feature of the design was that the top wing was not attached directly to the top of the fuselage as is common in cabin biplanes, but was mounted above it with cabane struts. Power was provided by three radial engines; one in the nose, and one mounted on each lower wing where the struts met. Performance was disappointing, and in particular, the narrow track of the undercarriage created difficulties. After the single prototype, no further examples were built.

== Specifications ==
General characteristics

- Crew: Two pilots
- Capacity: 4 passengers
- Length: 10.00 m (32 ft 10 in)
- Wingspan: 14.00 m (45 ft 11 in)
- Wing area: 44.1 m^{2} (475 sq ft)
- Empty weight: 1,830 kg (4,030 lb)
- Gross weight: 2,670 kg (5,890 lb)
- Powerplant: 3 × Walter Mars I , 108 kW (145 hp) each

Performance

- Maximum speed: 195 km/h (121 mph, 105 kn)
- Range: 750 km (466 mi, 405 nmi)
- Service ceiling: 4,500 m (14,760 ft)
