= DAR 1 =

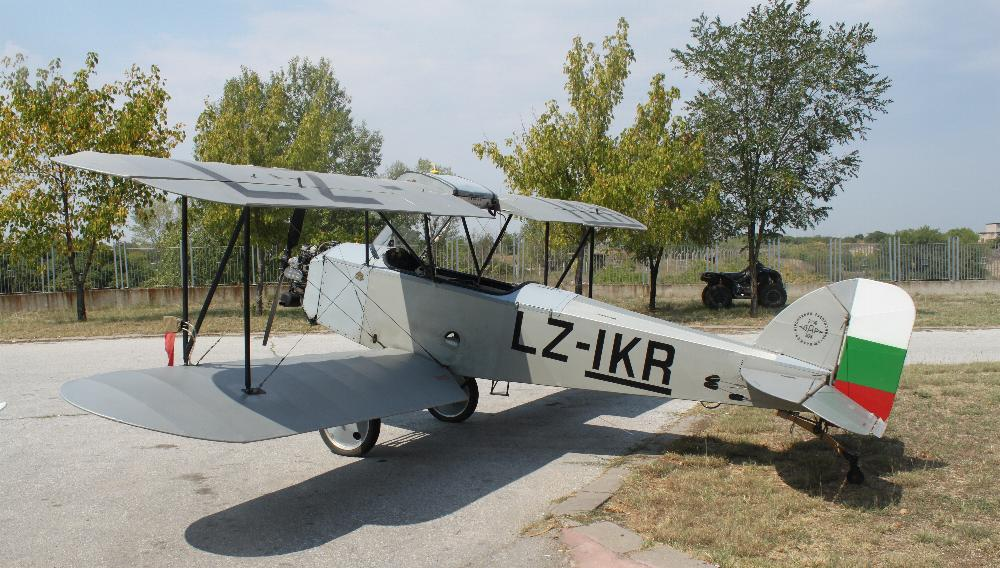

General information
- Type: Civil training aircraft
- National origin: Bulgaria
- Manufacturer: DAR
- Designer: Hermann Winter
- Number built: 20

History
- First flight: 1926

The DAR 1 Peperuda (butterfly) was a 1920s Bulgarian two-seat touring or trainer biplane, designed by Hermann Winter and built by the DAR – Darzhavna Aeroplanna Rabotilnitsa – State Aircraft Workshops.

== Design and development ==
The aircraft was a conventional two-seat single-bay biplane with a fixed tailskid landing gear, powered by a 60 hp (45 kW) Walter NZ radial engine. Further development resulted in the DAR 1A, which was powered by an 85 hp (63 kW) Walter Vega engine, eight DAR 1As being produced.

After the maiden flight and successful flight tests the DAR 1 was put into production in 1926. Production DAR 1A aircraft were delivered from 1928.

== Operational history ==
The twelve DAR 1 and eight DAR 1A aircraft were used by the Bulgarian Air Force at the Kazanlak Air School, for primary training and the Yato fighter squadron for continuation training, from 1926 to the early 1940s. Some DAR 1A aircraft were also used by the Civil Air Service as glider tugs.

== Variants ==
DAR 1
Initial production variant with a 60 hp (45 kW) Walter NZ 60 radial engine, 12 built.
DAR 1A
Variant powered by an 85 hp (63 kW) Walter Vega engine, eight built plus some upgraded from DAR 1s.

== Operators ==
Bulgaria

- Bulgarian Air Force

Kazanlak Air School
Yato Fighter Squadron

- Bulgarian Civil Air Service

== Specifications (DAR 1) ==
Data from Balkan Birds, p. 23.

General characteristics

- Crew: two
- Length: 6.25 m (20 ft 6 in)
- Wingspan: 9.30 m (30 ft 6 in)
- Empty weight: 405 kg (893 lb)
- Gross weight: 640 kg (1,411 lb)
- Powerplant: 1 × Walter NZ 60 radial piston engine, 45 kW (60 hp)

Performance

- Maximum speed: 135 km/h (84 mph, 73 kn)

== See also ==
Related lists

- List of Interwar military aircraft
