= Avia B-135 =

Cantilever monoplane fighter aircraft

B-135
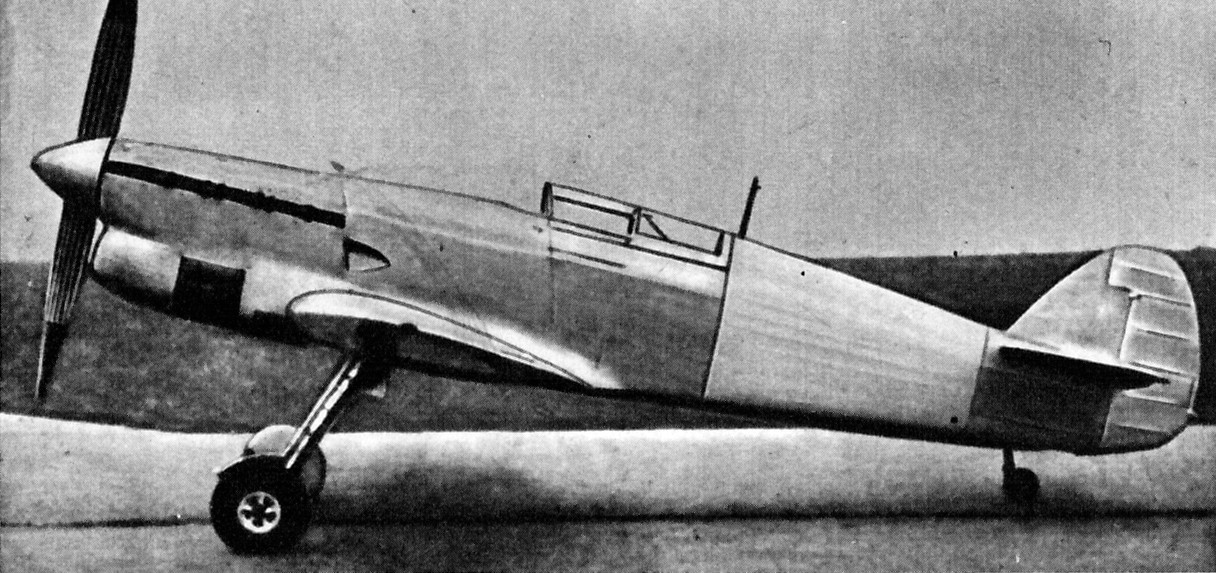

General information
- Type: Fighter
- Manufacturer: Avia
- Designer: František Novotný
- Primary user: Bulgarian Air Force
- Number built: 12

History
- First flight: 28 September 1938

The Avia B.135 was a Czechoslovak cantilever monoplane fighter aircraft. It was the production version of the Avia B.35 developed shortly before the war, based on the B.35/3 prototype (with a retracting main undercarriage) but featuring a new all-metal wing.

== History ==
The B.135/1 prototype attracted the attention of Bulgarian Air Force officers visiting the Avia plant, and a production contract for 12 aircraft and 62 engines was signed, as well as a license to allow an additional 50 airframes to be constructed by DAR as the DAR 11 Lyastovitsa (Bulgarian: "Лястовица"; "Swallow"). However, the DAR facilities proved to be incapable of producing the aircraft, and only the 12 Czech-built examples were ever made. Plans for further production were stopped by the RLM, which also interrupted engine deliveries after 35 units, and the Bulgarian Air Force was encouraged to purchase the Messerschmitt Bf 109 instead.

== Operational history ==
In service, the B.135s had continual engine problems and were soon relegated to training roles. Four aircraft did, however, see combat on 30 March 1944 when they intercepted USAAF bomber formations encroaching on Bulgarian airspace after attacking Ploieşti. Some (Bulgarian) sources credit Lieutenant Yordan Ferdinandov with a B-24 Liberator kill that morning. According to Bílý, all four Avias, led by Captain Atanasov, took part in the possible shooting down of a four-engined bomber that day. The downed aircraft crashed in the area of Tran and Breznik, according to the log of Lieutenant Yordan Ferdinandov.

== Operators ==
Czechoslovakia

- Czechoslovak Air Force

Bulgaria

- Bulgarian Air Force

== Specifications (B.135) ==
General characteristics

- Crew: one
- Length: 8.5 m (27 ft 11 in)
- Wingspan: 10.85 m (35 ft 7 in)
- Height: 1.6 m (5 ft 3 in)
- Wing area: 17 m^{2} (180 sq ft)
- Empty weight: 2,063 kg (4,548 lb)
- Max takeoff weight: 2,547 kg (5,615 lb)
- Powerplant: 1 × Avia (Hispano-Suiza) 12Ycrs V-12 liquid-cooled piston engine, 641 kW (860 hp)
- Propellers: 2-bladed wooden fixed pitch propeller

Performance

- Maximum speed: 535 km/h (332 mph, 289 kn) at 4,000 m (13,000 ft)
- Cruise speed: 460 km/h (290 mph, 250 kn)
- Range: 550 km (340 mi, 300 nmi)
- Service ceiling: 8,500 m (27,900 ft)
- Rate of climb: 13.5 m/s (2,660 ft/min)

Armament

- Guns:
- 1 × 20 mm (0.79 in) MG FF cannon
- 2 × 7.92 mm (0.312 in) vz. 30 (Česká zbrojovka Strakonice) machine guns

== See also ==
Aircraft of comparable role, configuration, and era

- Bloch MB.151
- Dewoitine D.520
- Hawker Hurricane
- Morane-Saulnier M.S.406
- Rogožarski IK-3

Related lists

- List of aircraft of World War II

== Bibliography ==
- Bernád, Dénes (July–August 2001). "Balkan Birds: Thirty-Five Years of Bulgarian Aircraft Production, Part One". Air Enthusiast (94): 18–30. ISSN 0143-5450.
- Kučera, P.; Bílý, M.; Bernád, D. (2003). Avia B-35/B-135 (in Czech/English). Praha, Czech Republic: MBI. ISBN 80-86524-03-5.
- Green, W. (2010). Aircraft of the Third Reich, Vol I. (1st ed.). London: Aerospace Publishing Limited. ISBN 978-1-900732-06-2.
- Green, W (1960). War Planes of the Second World War, Fighters, Vol I. London: Macdonald & Co. (Publishers) Ltd.
- Taylor, Michael J. H. Jane's Encyclopedia of Aviation. London: Studio Editions, 1989.
- World Aircraft Information Files. London: Bright Star Publishing. (pages=File 889 Sheet 85)
