= Albatros C.III =

1915 multi-role military aircraft

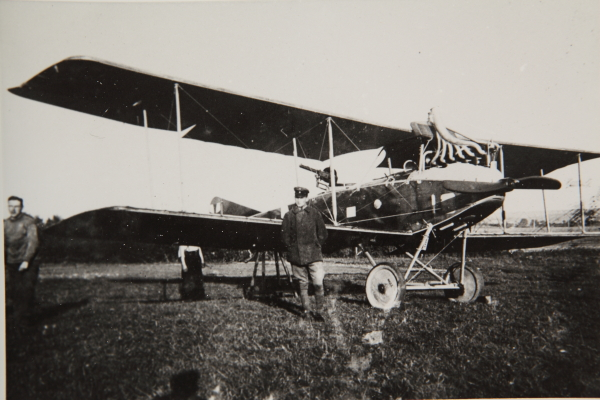

General information
- Type: General purpose
- Manufacturer: Albatros Flugzeugwerke; DAR
- Primary users: Luftstreitkräfte Polish Air Force; Bulgarian Air Force; Ottoman Air Force

History
- Introduction date: 1915

The Albatros C.III was a twin-seat general-purpose biplane designed and produced by the German aircraft manufacturer Albatros Flugzeugwerke. It was produced in greater numbers than any other C-type aircraft by Albatros as well as being the company's most-produced twin-seat aircraft.

The C.III was developed during 1915 as a refined and slightly smaller derivative of the successful Albatros C.I. The two aircraft shared similar construction and numerous features, the most distinct visual difference being its redesigned empennage, being both more rounded and lower than that of the C.I. As a result, the C.III was more responsive and agile, both being beneficial traits in aerial combat. Typically, both the observer and pilot were provisioned with machine guns, although the gun synchronizer for the pilot's forward-firing guns often malfunctioned and resulted in propeller damage. Up to 90 kg (200 lb) of bombs could also be carried, although the lack of a bombsight greatly hindered their effective use on the battlefield. For coordination with ground forces, a radio set could optionally be installed.

The Luftstreitkräfte first deployed the C.III on the Western Front during December 1915; it quickly deployed the type in a variety of roles beyond aerial reconnaissance, including as a light bomber and a bomber escort. The aircraft was produced by numerous manufacturers, enabling it to become available in quantity rather quickly. By mid-1917, the C.III was mainly being used as a trainer aircraft, a task which it was well-suited to on account of its favourable flying characteristics, natural stability, and availability. It remained in Luftstreitkräfte service through to the Armistice of 11 November 1918. Various other nations acquired their own C.IIIs, leading to its use by the Polish Air Force, Bulgarian Air Force, and Ottoman Air Force amongst others. Small batches were also produced during the 1920s.

== Design ==
The C.III has its origins in the Albatros C.I, being directly derived from it and being a slightly more compact aircraft. The most prominent visual difference between the two aircraft was the revised vertical stabilizer; the C.III possessed a lower and rounded tail in place of the large triangular tail of the C.I, which, in combination with its reduced weight, provided greater agility to the newer aircraft. Specifically, the revised empennage of the C.III gave more sensitive and immediate longitudinal control in comparison to the docile C.I, an aspect that proved valuable when performing evasive combat maneuvers. The rudder was noticeably more rounded than that of the C.I.

The fuselage of the C.III was, akin to the C.I and B.II, was primarily composed of plywood. This construction proved to be fairly capable of absorbing damage, which made it somewhat difficult to shoot down in combat. The wings were covered with fabric and had a wooden structure, aside from the steel tubing used for the flight control surfaces. The C.III could be outfitted with various power plants, such as the 110 kW (150 hp) Benz Bz. III or 120 kW (160 hp) Mercedes D.III inline engine and, like numerous other twin-seaters used during the conflict (such as the British Royal Aircraft Factory R.E.8) the cylinder head and exhaust manifold protruded above the front fuselage, somewhat limiting the pilot's forward visibility.

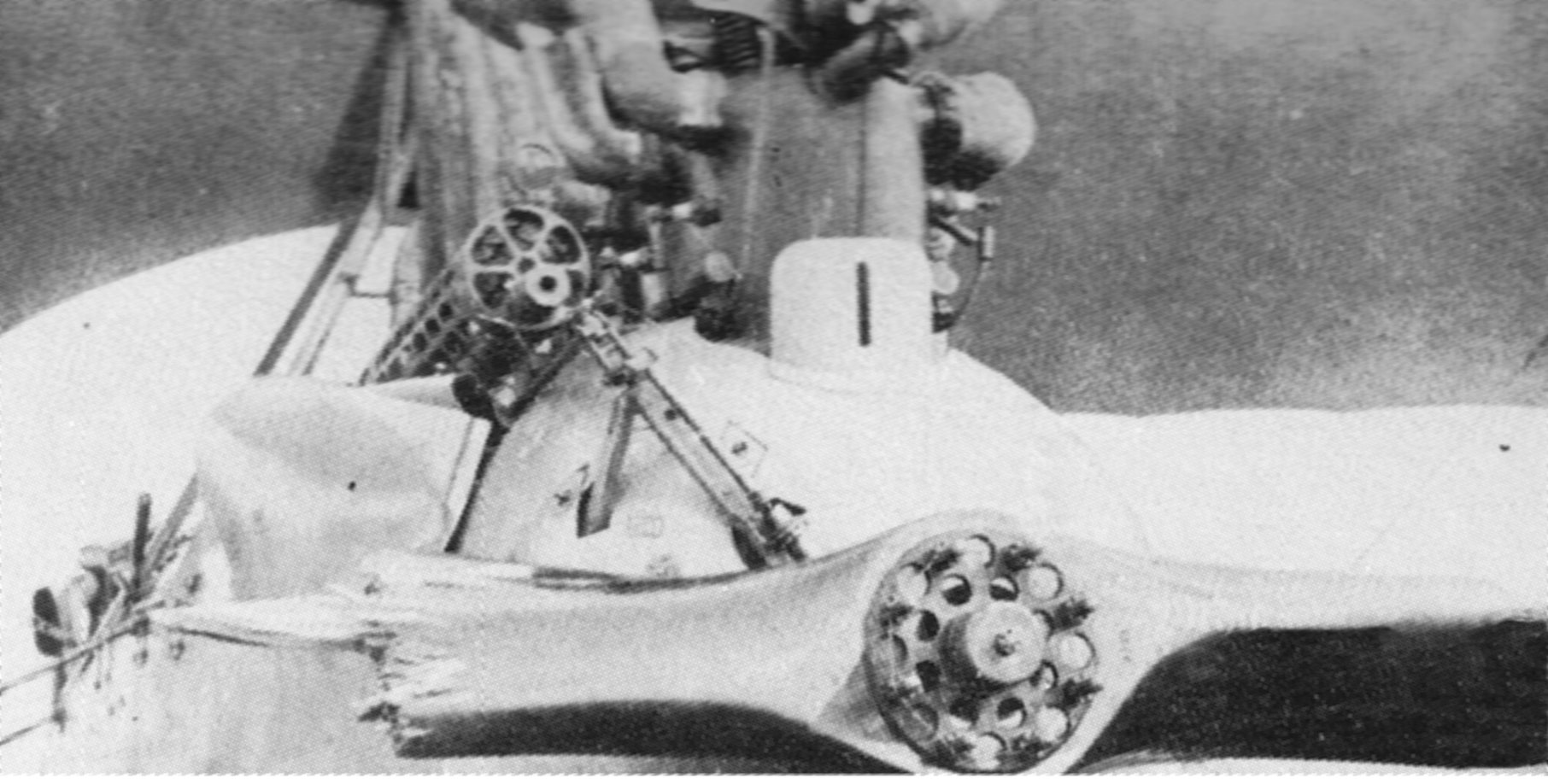
A C.III with a damaged propeller blade due to a gun synchronizer fault

The observer, who occupied the rear cockpit, was armed with a single 7.92 mm (0.312 in) Parabellum MG14 machine gun. After it was recognised that the addition of more weaponry would not unduly impact performance, the C.III was routinely fitted with a single forward-firing 7.92 mm (0.312 in) LMG 08/15 machine gun. The forward-firing machine gun was fitted with a gun synchronizer, however, this device often proved to be less effective than desired as multiple instances of pilots accidentally destroying their own propeller were recorded. For the artillery spotting role, the C.III could be equipped with a radio set. The C.III could also carry a bomb load of up to 90 kg (200 lb) across four vertical tubes in the fuselage or upon external racks. The aiming of these bombs was not easy due to the lack of an accurate sighting device, limiting the aircraft's use as a bomber to barely more than harassment.

German authorities enthusiastically received the C.III; cumulative orders for 2,271 aircraft were placed for the type. In order to fulfil this vast demand, arrangements to produce the type were granted to numerous aircraft manufacturers across the Central Powers, including Luft-Fahrzeug-Gesellschaft, Linke-Hoffman Werke, Deutsche Flugzeug-Werke, and Albatros' Austro-Hungarian subsidiary Ostdeutsche Albatros Werke (OAW).

== Operational history ==
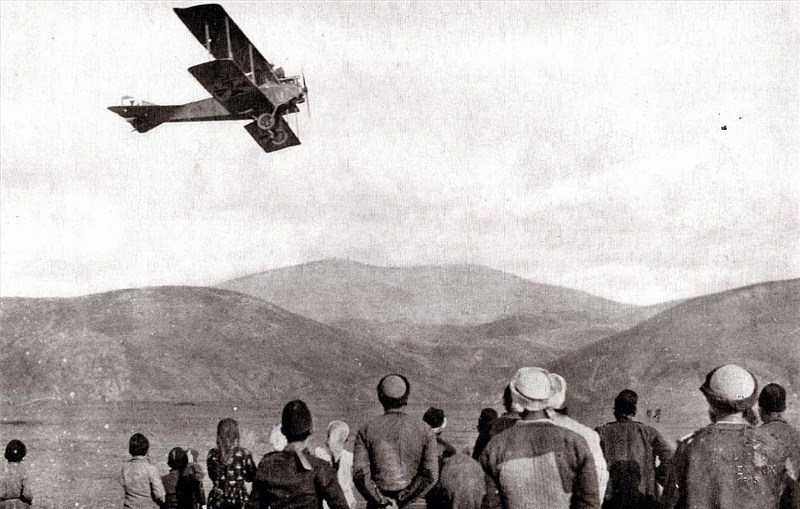
A C.III in flight over the Balkans in March 1918

The first of the Luftstreitkräftes C.IIIs arrived at the Western Front during December 1915. It was promptly used in a wide variety of roles, including observation, aerial reconnaissance, light bombing and bomber escort. Despite these varied mission types, the C.III was most commonly used to perform reconnaissance. The operational peak for the type was reached during August 1916, at which point 354 aircraft were believed to be operational at the front.

By mid-1917, the C.III had mostly been withdrawn from frontline service with the Luftstreitkräfte, although deliveries of the type were still underway by this point; the aircraft having been relegated to secondary duties, mostly to training units. As such, it remained in service until the Armistice of 11 November 1918 that ended the conflict.

During August 1916, at least eighteen C.IIIs were delivered to Bulgaria. These were all destroyed in 1920 in accordance with the Treaty of Neuilly-sur-Seine. According to other sources, 26 Albatros C.III were delivered to Bulgaria, including eight trainers.

In the aftermath of the First World War, the Polish Air Force operated around 15 C.III for a time. These saw active combat during the Polish-Soviet War.

Between 1926 and 1927, two Mercedes D.III engined copies were built from saved parts and components of the destroyed aircraft by Bulgarian state aircraft workshops DAR as the DAR 2 for use as trainers. According to the military historian Dimitar Nedialkov, twelve DAR 2s were built (at least nine are confirmed by a photograph). Three C.IIIs were built in 1927-1928 at Lithuanian Karo Aviacijos dirbtuvės (Military Aviation Workshop) in Kaunas.

== Variants ==
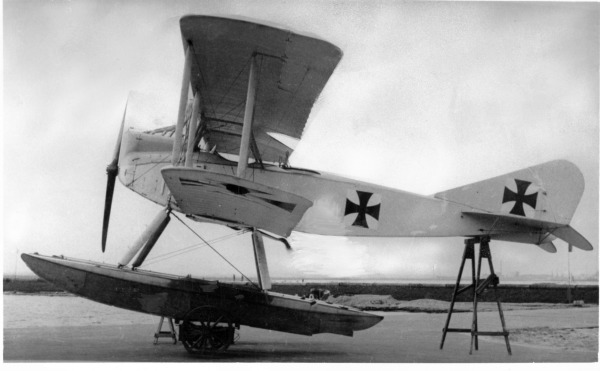
The W.2 derived directly from the C.III

Data from Gray

C.VI
(L 16) about 300 mm (11.8 in) shorter and 20 kg (44 lb), with strengthened engine bearers to take a 180 hp (134 kW) Argus As III six-cylinder inline. Some 4% faster. Limited production.

W.2
Seaplane variant with twin floats, modified Mercedes D.II installation, revised cabane strut and a much larger fin. Parabellum MG14 machine gun in observer's cockpit. Only one produced, delivered in June 1916.

== Operators ==
Bulgaria

- Bulgarian Air Force (including DAR-2)

Finland

- Finnish Air Force

German Empire

- Luftstreitkräfte
- Marine Flieger-Abteilung

Latvia

- Latvian Air Force

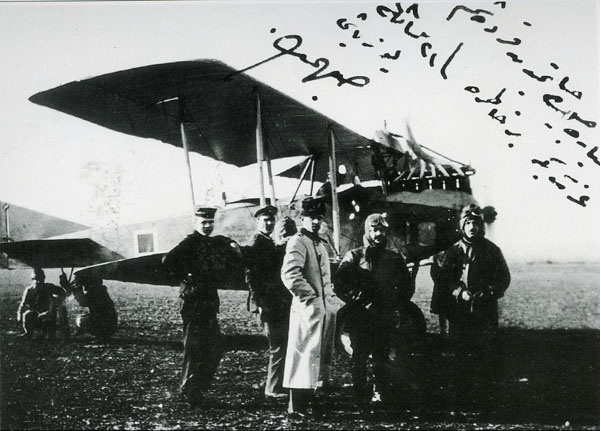
A Turkish C.III

Lithuania

- Lithuanian Air Force (12 bought and 3 built)

Poland

- Polish Air Force (15 used)

Turkey

- Ottoman Air Force (No AK 8 to AK 41)

Austria-Hungary

- Austro-Hungarian Air Force

== Specifications (C.III) ==
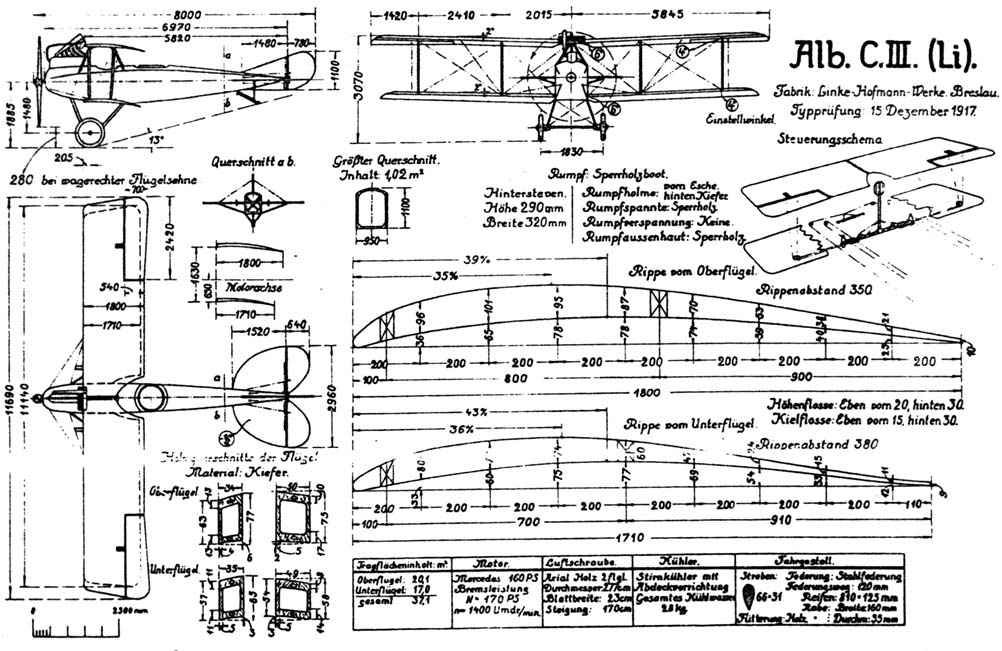
Albatros C.III German World War 1 reconnaissance and training biplane drawing

Data from German Aircraft of the First World War

General characteristics

- Crew: 2
- Length: 7.9 m (25 ft 11 in)
- Wingspan: 11.7 m (38 ft 5 in)
- Height: 3.2 m (10 ft 6 in)
- Wing area: 36.91 m^{2} (397.3 sq ft)
- Empty weight: 830 kg (1,830 lb)
- Gross weight: 1,343 kg (2,961 lb)
- Powerplant: 1 × Argus As.III six-cylinder water-cooled in-line piston engine, 130 kW (180 hp)
- Propellers: 2-bladed propeller

Performance

- Maximum speed: 145 km/h (90 mph, 78 kn)
- Endurance: four hours and 30 minutes
- Service ceiling: 3,350 m (10,990 ft)
- Time to altitude: 3,000 m (9,800 ft) in 35 minutes

Armament

- Guns: 1 × 7.92 mm (0.312 in) Parabellum MG14 machine gun in observer's cockpit and 1 × fixed forward-firing 7.92 mm (0.312 in) LMG 08/15 in the nose.
- Bombs: up to 200 lb (91 kg) of bombs

== See also ==
Related development

- Albatros C.I
- Albatros C.V

Aircraft of comparable role, configuration, and era

- Aviatik C.I
- LVG C.II
- Royal Aircraft Factory R.E.8
- Rumpler C.I

Related lists

- List of military aircraft of Germany
