= DAR 9 Siniger =

General information
- Type: Sport Trainer
- National origin: Bulgaria
- Manufacturer: Darzhavna Aeroplanna Rabotilnitsa (DAR)
- Number built: 42

History
- Introduction date: 1940
- Developed from: Focke-Wulf Fw 44 Stieglitz

The DAR-9 Siniger, was a trainer produced in Bulgaria during World War II.

== Design and development ==
To provide the Bulgarian Air Force with a modern trainer, DAR took out a licence to build the Focke-Wulf Fw 44J. The first series, powered by a Siemens-Halske Sh 14 radial engine, was built at the DAR factory, but subsequent series were built at the DSF (Derzhavna Samoletna Fabrika)

Surviving aircraft in 1948 were re-engined with Walter Minor 6.III inline engines due to difficulty in procuring spares and the poor condition of the Siemens-Halske engines.

DAR 9 production consisted of the series 1, which was built at the DAR factory and which carried the construction numbers 88 to 93 and Series 2 to Series 5, built at the DSF factory and which carried construction numbers 95 to 130.

== Operational history ==
The DAR 9s were used for training at the Kazanlak Air School until at least 1949. Nine surplus DAR 9s were transferred to the Yugoslavian Air Force in 1947, withdrawn from service by 1958. One DAR 9 is preserved at the Technicki Muzej, Zagreb, Croatia.

== Variants ==
DAR 9
Initial designation of the Sh-14-powered aircraft.
DAR 9A
Aircraft re-engined with Walter Minor 6.III engines were redesignated DAR 9A.

== Operators ==
Bulgaria

- Bulgarian Air Force

Kazanlak Air School
Yugoslavia

- Yugoslavian Air Force

== Specifications (DAR 9) ==
General characteristics

- Crew: two
- Length: 7.3 m (23 ft 11 in)
- Wingspan: 9 m (29 ft 6 in)
- Wing area: 20 m^{2} (220 sq ft)
- Empty weight: 560 kg (1,235 lb)
- Gross weight: 900 kg (1,984 lb)
- Powerplant: 1 × Siemens Sh 14A , 120 kW (160 hp)

Performance

- Maximum speed: 185 km/h (115 mph, 100 kn)
- Range: 520 km (320 mi, 280 nmi)
- Service ceiling: 4,400 m (14,400 ft)

== Bibliography ==
- Bernád, Dénes (July–August 2001). "Balkan Birds: Thirty-Five Years of Bulgarian Aircraft Production, Part One". Air Enthusiast (94): 18–30. ISSN 0143-5450.
- Insignia Issue 9 August 1998 pp26–31
- Wings of Fame Vol.13
- Gunston, Bill (1993). World Encyclopedia of Aircraft Manufacturers. Annapolis: Naval Institute Press. p. 89.
- World Aircraft Information Files. London: Bright Star Publishing. pp. File 891 Sheet 56.
