= DAR 6 =

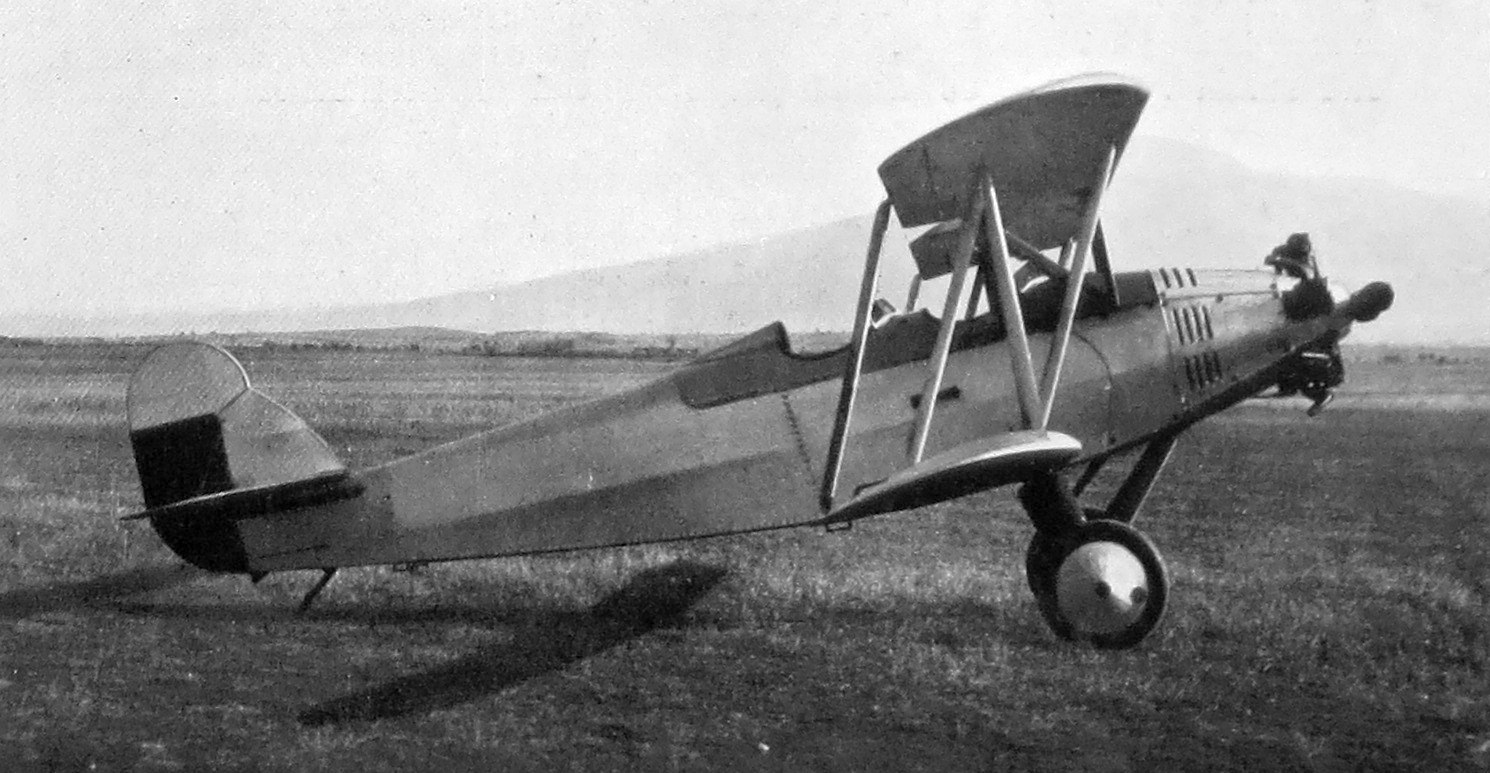
- DAR 6 with engine Walter Vega

General information
- Type: Training biplane
- Manufacturer: DAR
- Designer: Zevtan Lazarov
- Primary user: Bulgarian Air Force

History
- First flight: 1930s

The DAR 6 was a 1930s Bulgarian two-seat basic or advanced biplane training aircraft.

== Design and development ==
The DAR 6 was designed by Zevtan Lazarov. It was constructed by the Bulgarian State Aircraft Workshops (DAR).

The aircraft was a conventional biplane with a fixed tailskid landing gear. It was powered by a radial engine.

Three versions were initially developed:

- Basic training version, powered by an 85 hp (63 kW) Walter Vega engine;
- Advanced training version, powered by a 145 hp (108 kW) Walter Mars I engine;
- 1937 Model DAR 6a. This variant offered faired struts and redesigned divided landing gear. It was powered by a 150 hp (112 kW) Walter Mars I engine.

== Operators ==
Bulgaria

- Bulgarian Air Force

== Specifications (DAR 6) ==
Data from The Illustrated Encyclopedia of Aircraft, (Part Work 1982–1985), Orbis Publishing, Page 1295

General characteristics

- Crew: two, pilot and student
- Length: 6.85 m (22 ft 5.75 in)
- Wingspan: 9.05 m (29 ft 8.25 in)
- Height: 2.85 m (9 ft 4.25 in)
- Wing area: 19.30 m^{2} (207.75 sq ft)
- Empty weight: 510 kg (1,124 lb)
- Gross weight: 770 kg (1,697 lb)
- Powerplant: 1 × Walter Mars I radial piston engine , 108 kW (145 hp)

Performance

- Maximum speed: 180 km/h (112 mph, 97 kn)
- Range: 715 km (444 mi, 386 nmi)

== Bibliography ==
- Bernád, Dénes (July–August 2001). "Balkan Birds: Thirty-Five Years of Bulgarian Aircraft Production, Part One". Air Enthusiast (94): 18–30. ISSN 0143-5450.
- The Illustrated Encyclopedia of Aircraft, (Part Work 1982–1985), Orbis Publishing, Page 1295
