= DAR 10 =

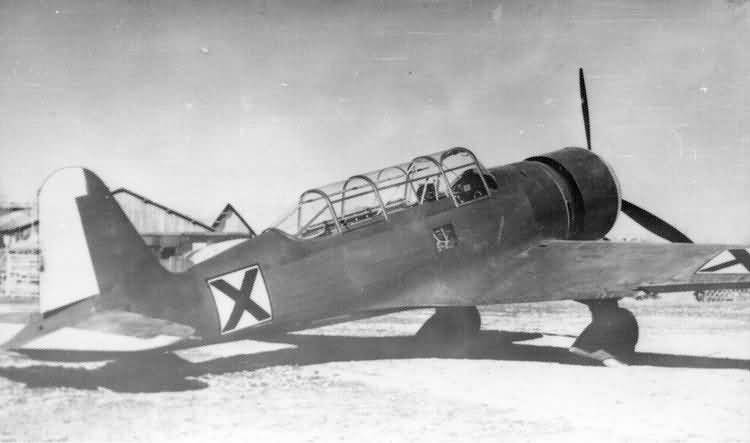

General information
- Type: Light bomber and reconnaissance
- Manufacturer: Darzhavna Aeroplanna Rabotilnitsa
- Status: Prototype
- Primary user: Bulgarian Air Force
- Number built: 2

History
- First flight: July 1941

The DAR 10 (ДАР 10) was a Bulgarian light bomber and reconnaissance aircraft. DAR-10 was designed for horizontal and dive bombing, reconnaissance, and ground attack.

== Design and development ==
The DAR 10 was designed by Zvetan Lazarov in 1938 in the DAR (Darzhavna Aeroplanna Rabotilnitsa, meaning literally 'State Airplane Workshop') factory in Bozhurishte, near the capital Sofia.

The DAR 10 was a single-engine two-seat (pilot and gunner) low-wing cantilever monoplane aircraft of conventional layout. Its two seats were in tandem under enclosed glazing. Its tailwheel undercarriage was fixed, and the mainwheels were spatted. The wings had a wooden structure, covered with plywood. Flaps were not used.

The fuselage was comparatively wide and deep, to accommodate the nose-mounted radial engine. It was constructed of steel-tube framework and wood formers, covered with fabric.

Three-bladed steel propellers were used.

Two prototypes were built, powered by different engines:

- DAR 10A Bekas (Bulgarian: "snipe"), powered by an Alfa Romeo 128 R.C.21 nine-cylinder radial engine rated at 950 hp (709 kW). This was the first DAR 10 to fly, on 2 July 1941. It was designed to carry four machine guns (two fixed forward-firing and two in rear gunner position). It could carry five 100-kg bombs, mounted under the wings. There was also the possibility of a fixed 20 mm forward-firing cannon installation in the forward fuselage.

This aircraft crashed in October 1942. In spite of good flight reviews, the type was not chosen for production. The high-wing KB-11 Fazan was selected for production instead.

- DAR 10F (the "F" to indicate its Fiat engine), powered by a Fiat A 74 R.C.38 14-cylinder radial engine rated at 870 hp (649 kW). This aircraft first flew in March 1945. It was slightly heavier and longer than the DAR-10A. Its top speed was 454 km/h (282 mph). Thanks to a stronger construction and dive brakes, it could serve also as a dive bomber. It could be equipped with two fixed fuselage-mounted 20 mm cannon firing forward, two fixed wing-mounted machine guns, and two machine guns for the gunner. It could carry one 500 kg (1,100 lb) bomb or one 250 kg (551 lb) and four 100 kg (110 lb). The bombs were mounted under the fuselage and wings.

The DAR-10 was not selected for production. Some sources suggest that it was passed over in favor of the German Junkers Ju 87 Stuka dive bomber, while the improved DAR-10F was not selected as World War II had ended and Bulgaria had access to ample supplies of modern Soviet aircraft such as the Ilyushin Il-2 and Il-10.

== Variants ==
DAR-10A
First prototype, powered by an Alfa Romeo radial engine.
DAR-10F
Second prototype, powered by a Fiat radial engine.

== Operators ==
Bulgaria

- Bulgarian Air Force

== Specifications (DAR-10F) ==
Data from Letadla 39–45: Državna Aeroplanna Rabotilnica DAR-10F

General characteristics

- Crew: 2
- Length: 9.85 m (32 ft 4 in)
- Wingspan: 12.65 m (41 ft 6 in)
- Height: 3.00 m (9 ft 10 in)
- Wing area: 22.90 m^{2} (246.5 sq ft)
- Empty weight: 2,032 kg (4,480 lb)
- Gross weight: 2,900 kg (6,393 lb)
- Max takeoff weight: 3,423 kg (7,546 lb) (overload)
- Powerplant: 1 × Fiat A.74 RC-38 14-cylinder air-cooled radial engine, 706 kW (947 hp)

Performance

- Maximum speed: 454 km/h (282 mph, 245 kn) at 5,000 m (16,000 ft)
- Cruise speed: 365 km/h (227 mph, 197 kn)
- Range: 1,400 km (870 mi, 760 nmi)
- Service ceiling: 9,000 m (30,000 ft)
- Time to altitude: 6.7 min to 3,000 m (9,800 ft)

Armament

- Guns:
  - 2× 20 mm MG FF cannon in wings,
  - 1× 7.9 mm MG 15 machine gun in rear cockpit,
  - provision for 2× 7.9 mm MG 17 machine guns in underwing pods
- Bombs:
  - 1× 500 kg (1,100 lb) bomb under fuselage, or
  - 1× 250 kg (550 lb) bomb under fuselage and 4× 50 kg (110 lb) under wings

== See also ==
Aircraft of comparable role, configuration, and era

- PZL.23 Karaś
- Neman R-10
- Junkers Ju 87
- Mitsubishi Ki-30

Related lists

- List of bomber aircraft

== Bibliography ==
- Bernád, Dénes (July–August 2001). "Balkan Birds: Thirty-Five Years of Bulgarian Aircraft Production, Part One". Air Enthusiast. No. 94. pp. 18–30. ISSN 0143-5450.
- Nĕmeček, Václav (1982). "Letadla 39–45: Državna Aeroplnna Rabotilnica DAR-10F". Letectví + Kosmonautika (in Czech). Vol. LVIII, no. 1. p. 31.
- Noël, Jean; Passingham, Malcolm (July 1991). "La production aéronautique bulgare (Deuxième partie)". Le Fana de l'Aviation (in French). No. 260. pp. 46–53.
