= Light bomber =

Bomber class made for attacking ground targets with small bomb loads over short distances

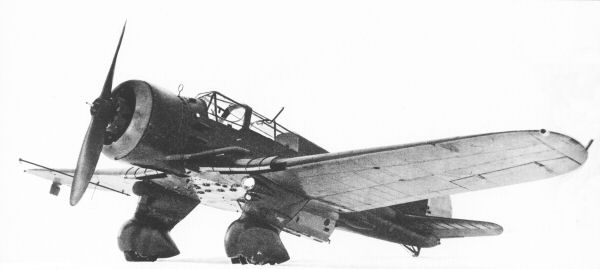
Circa 1937. The single-engine PZL.23 Karaś was the main light bomber used by Polish forces at the beginning of World War II.

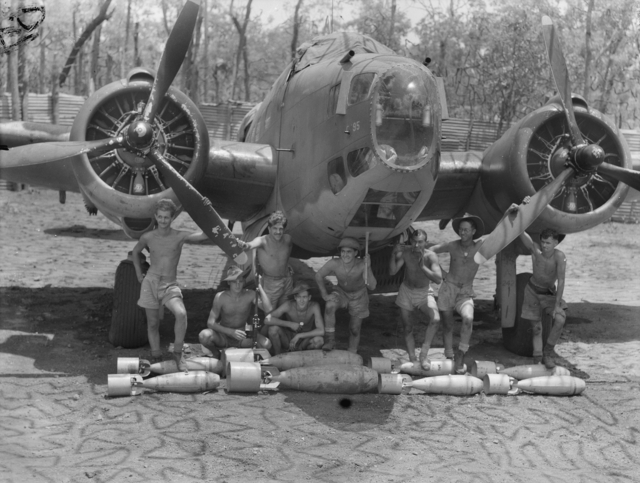
1943. A twin-engine Lockheed Hudson of No. 2 Squadron RAAF. Its crew and ground staff pose for the photographer, prior to loading the Hudson with its bomb load in the foreground.

A light bomber is a relatively small and fast type of military bomber aircraft that was primarily employed before the 1950s. Such aircraft would typically not carry more than one ton of ordnance.

The earliest light bombers were intended to drop their bombs in level flight over a target. During World War I some air forces began to distinguish between light bombers and the earliest purpose-built attack aircraft which carried out ground attack, close air support, anti-shipping and similar missions. After World War I, attack aircraft were typically identifiable by their ability to carry multiple fixed machine guns, automatic cannons and rockets in addition to bombs. Light bombers have often served as attack aircraft and vice versa.

Purpose-built light bombers disappeared from military aviation by the end of World War II, as advancements in propulsion and aeronautical design enabled newer attack/strike aircraft, fighter-bombers, and multirole aircraft types to deliver equal or greater bomb loads while also having superior performance, range and defensive capabilities. Modern aircraft carrying out similar missions include light attack aircraft, strike fighters, and counter-insurgency aircraft.

== History ==
=== Before 1914 ===
The first aircraft purposely designed for bombing missions were the Italian Caproni Ca 30 and British Bristol T.B.8, both built in 1913. The T.B.8 was a single engine biplane built by the Bristol Aeroplane Company. It was fitted with a prismatic bombsight in the front cockpit and a cylindrical bomb carrier in the lower forward fuselage capable of carrying 12 x 10 lb (12 x 4.5 kg) bombs, which could be dropped individually or all together. The T.B.8 was purchased for use both by the Royal Naval Air Service (RNAS) and the Royal Flying Corps (RFC).

=== World War I ===
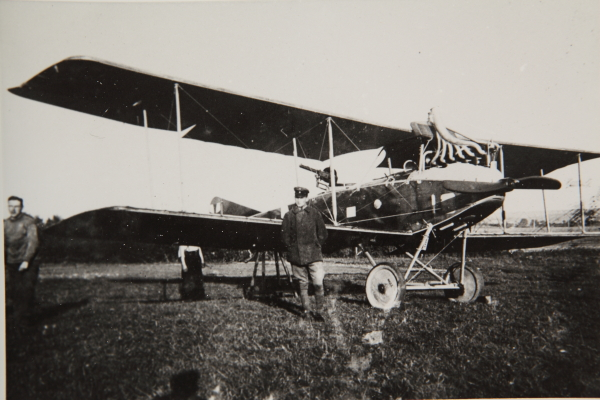
An Albatros C.III of the German Luftstreitkräfte, circa 1916. While it was designed as an "armed reconnaissance" type, the C.III was also a light bomber of World War I.

The Eastbourne RNAS Squadron, operating the T.B.3, carried out the first bombing attack of World War I: on 25 November 1914, under the command of Charles Rumney Samson, the squadron attacked coastal gun batteries operated by German Empire forces, at Middelkerke, Belgium.

Most bombers used on World War I battlefields were in fact light bombers: typically single-engine biplanes with a bomb load of 50–400 kg. Two of the most famous were the Airco DH.4 designed by Geoffrey de Havilland, and the Breguet 14 designed by Louis Breguet. The same type often also served as reconnaissance aircraft; examples include the Albatros C.III, Avro 504, DFW C.V, Ansaldo SVA, LVG C.II, Royal Aircraft Factory R.E.8, Rumpler C.I and Voisin III. The Royal Aircraft Factory B.E.2 was even modified as a pioneering night fighter in attempts to shoot down German Zeppelins.

=== 1918–1939 ===
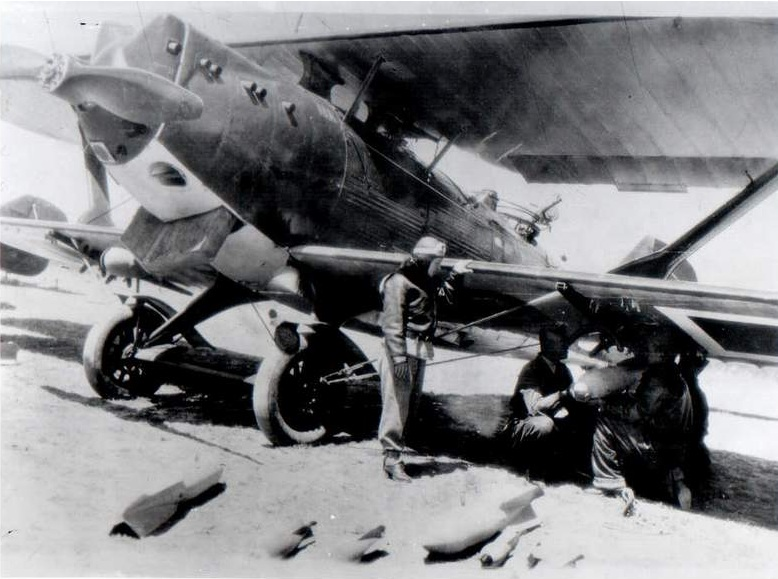
1937. Turkish air force pilot Sabiha Gökçen inspects her Breguet 19 as it is loaded with bombs.

By the early 1930s many air forces were seeking to replace their older biplane aircraft (for example, the RAF's Hawker Hart and VVS's Polikarpov R-5) with more modern and higher performance monoplane designs. Specialised light bomber designs were single-engine or twin-engine aircraft with a bomb load of about 500–1,000 kg. Typical single-engine light bombers of this era included the Fairey Battle, Kawasaki Ki-32 (later known by the Allied reporting name "Mary"), Mitsubishi Ki-30 ("Ann"), Mitsubishi Ki-51 ("Sonia"), PZL.23 Karaś, and Sukhoi Su-2. Contemporaneous twin-engine light bombers included the Bristol Blenheim, Douglas B-23 Dragon, Kawasaki Ki-48 ("Lily"), Martin Maryland (also known as the A-22), Lockheed Hudson, Tupolev SB, and Mitsubishi G3M ("Nell"). While the Mitsubishi G3M was classified by the Imperial Japanese Navy as a medium bomber, it was a land-based day bomber with bomb loads as small as 800 kg (1,800 lb) and had a secondary role as a torpedo bomber. Many of these aircraft were also used in other non-offensive roles, such as reconnaissance and maritime patrol.

A sub-type of light bomber also emerged in the 1930s, the fast bomber (German Schnellbomber), which prioritised speed as a self-defense measure; even the bomb load was minimised towards this design goal. Early examples were the Bristol Blenheim and Dornier Do 17 (both introduced in 1937). A weakness of the fast bomber design concept was that improvements in the speed of bombers were, in most cases, quickly matched in subsequent fighter designs (which would additionally eclipse the load-carrying ability of light bomber aircraft within a few years).

=== World War II ===
During the early stages of World War II, the above-mentioned designs of the late 1930s often saw considerable action. In some cases, they became the basis of newer, faster light bombers, such as the Martin Baltimore (U.S. designation A-23/A-30 developed from the Maryland), as well as medium bombers with more powerful engines and heavier payloads.

Twin-engine light bombers were successful when converted into airborne radar-equipped night fighters during World War II; examples include the Bristol Blenheim, Douglas A-20 Havoc (as the P-70), and Dornier Do 17. Light bombers were selected as a basis for night fighters during this time because early airborne radar systems, used to find and track targets in the dark, were bulky and often required a dedicated operator in the crew; most smaller day fighters of that era were unsuited to such extra weight and personnel. Conversely, the Petlyakov Pe-3, which had been designed as a night fighter, was often used a light bomber.

Many other aircraft which originally had been designed as fighters or other mission-specific bombers but fit the size, performance and payload requirements for the light bomber role would also be adapted to perform such missions during World War II. Most dive bombers, such as the Junkers Ju 87 Stuka and Vultee Vengeance were light bombers by definition, as these aircraft typically carried bomb loads of one ton or less. Likewise, many torpedo bombers were light bombers according to their size and warload and it was common for these aircraft to also be used for level bombing missions. The Bristol Beaufort, Nakajima B5N and Grumman TBF Avenger, while designed as torpedo bombers, saw some action purely in the light bomber role. Types designed before the war as heavy fighters were also frequently adapted as light bombers, including the Messerschmitt Bf 110, Potez 633, Fokker G.I, Kawasaki Ki-45, Bristol Beaufighter, and Lockheed P-38 Lightning.

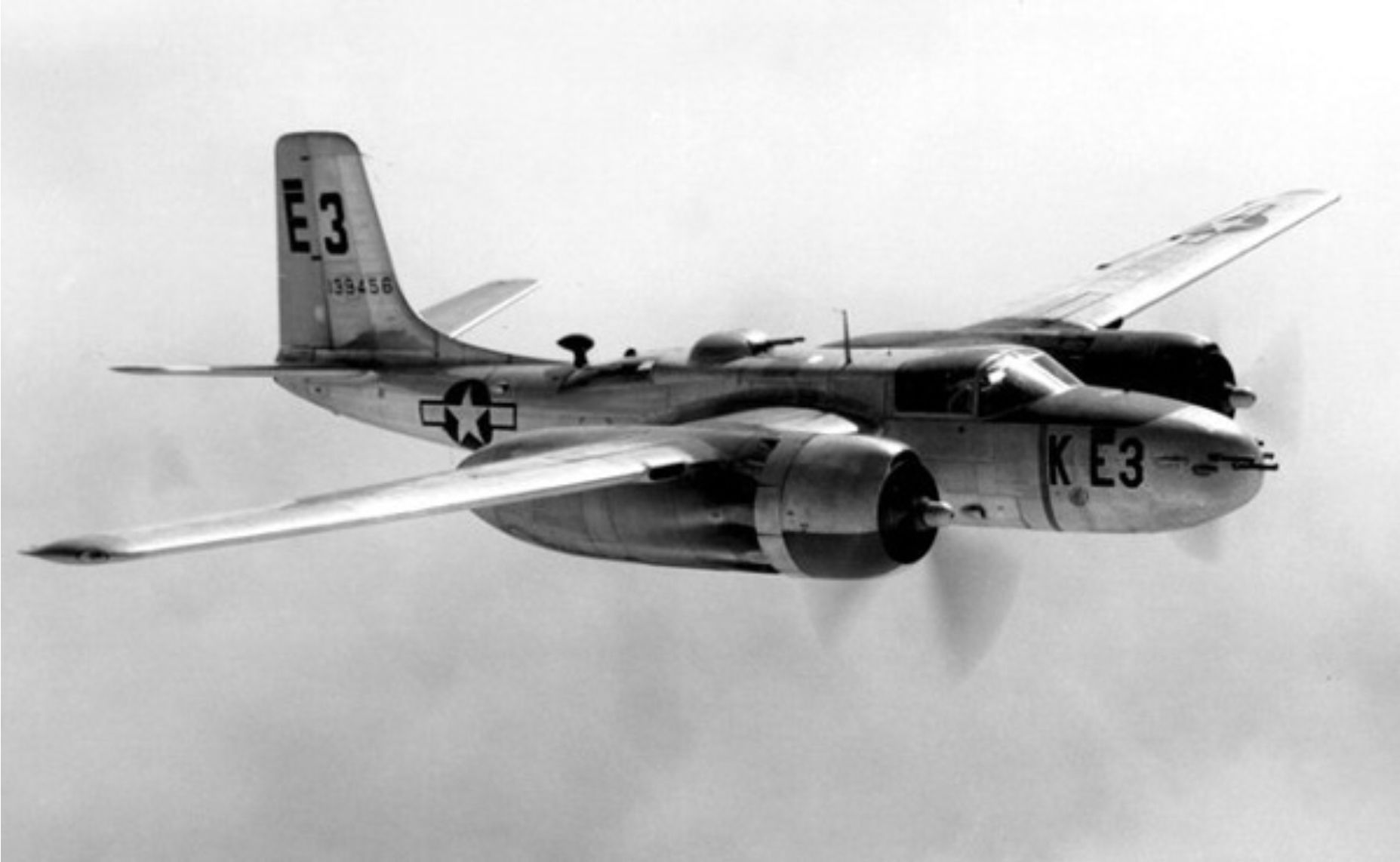
Douglas A-26 Invader light bomber. Introduced at the end of World War II, it would go on to serve in Korea and Indochina as the B-26 (and also replaced USAAF's Martin Marauder medium bomber of that designation).

Light attack aircraft such as the Breda Ba.65, Ilyushin Il-2 Šturmovík, Northrop A-17, and Vultee V-11 initially differed little in armament and operational role from light bombers. As World War II progressed, specialised attack designs became increasingly focused on low altitude strafing of surface targets, armed with automatic cannons, heavy machine guns and newly developed rockets; the A-20 and B-25 Mitchell (type-classed as a medium bomber) each had variants with 8 or more forward-firing machine guns for ground strafing missions. Later variants of the Ju 87 Stuka dive bomber were adapted to the role of ground attack against tanks armed with 37 mm cannon, and the Curtiss SB2C Helldiver (a U.S. Navy dive bomber adopted later in World War II when that design role was beginning to disappear) also was assigned to ground attack sorties using its cannon, bombs and rockets.

The light bomber, as a discrete aircraft type, began to be superseded as World War II opened. The growth of engine power from the 1,000 hp to the 2,000 hp class during the war produced single-engine fighters with greater performance, offensive and defensive capabilities than the light bombers of only a few years earlier. This gave rise to the fighter-bomber type, notably the Fw 190 F and G models, Hawker Typhoon and Republic P-47 Thunderbolt. Multirole twin-engine designs capable of hauling bomb loads greater than 2,000 lbs such as the Lockheed P-38 Lightning, Junkers Ju 88 and de Havilland Mosquito also supplanted earlier 1930s-era light bomber designs during the war.

One of the last light bombers to be introduced in World War II, the U.S. Douglas A-26 Invader, replaced the earlier A-20 Havoc type and also was designated by the USAAF as a replacement for its Martin B-26 Marauder (which had the same engines and a similar bomb load as the Invader) medium bomber.

=== Post-World War II ===
The substantial increases in performance, load-carrying ability, and multirole versatility of new combat aircraft designs (including the advent of jet aircraft) by the end of World War II signaled the end of the dedicated light bomber type. Attack aircraft, strike fighters, counter-insurgency aircraft and combat UAVs are types which today carry out technologically enhanced equivalents of the former light bomber role.

== See also ==
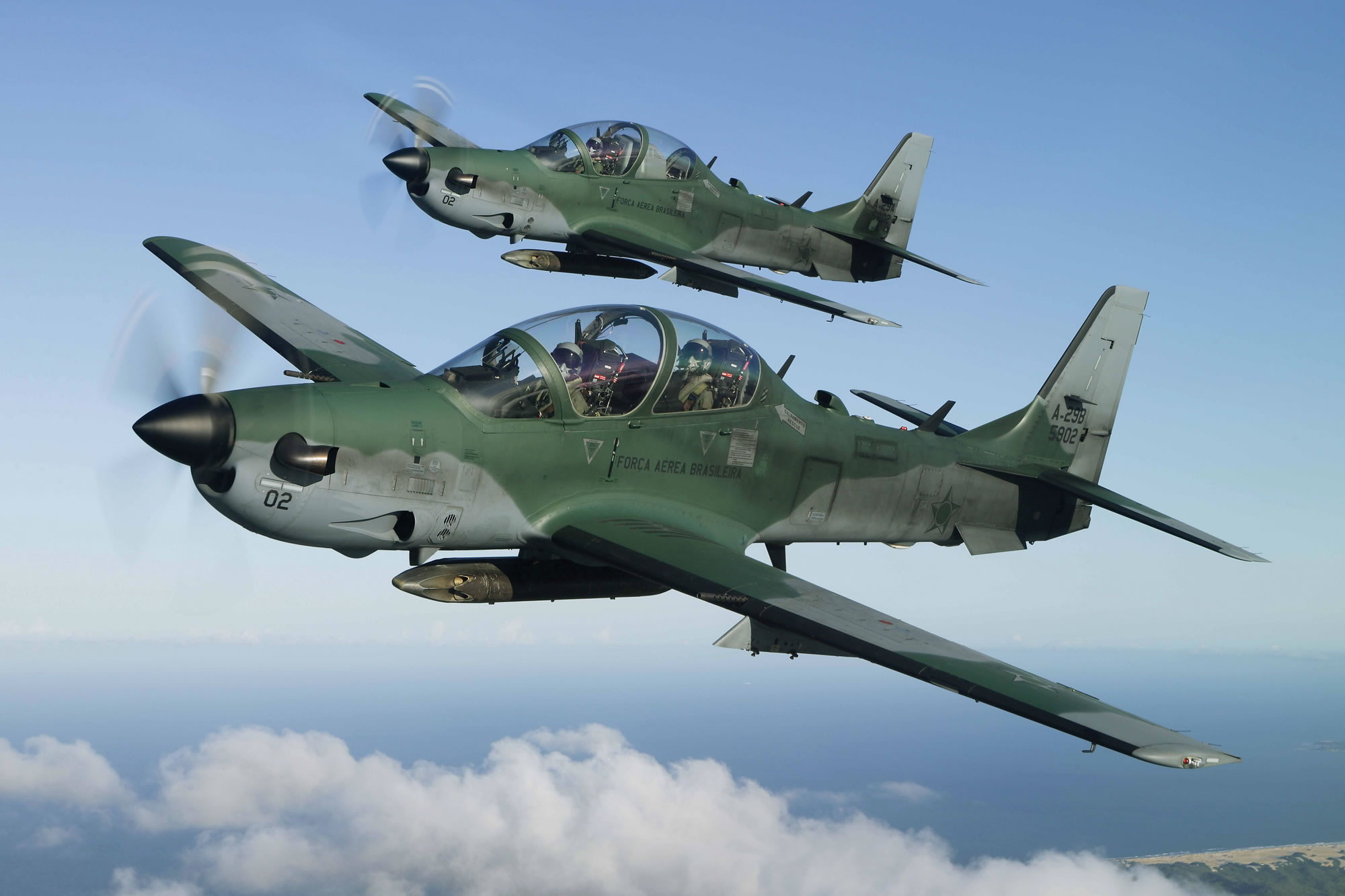
Brazilian Air Force Embraer A-29 Super Tucanos in flight over the Amazon Rainforest.

- Attack aircraft
- Strike fighter
- Fighter-bomber
- Medium bomber
- Heavy bomber
- Strategic bomber
- Strategic bombing
- Tactical bombing
- Counter-insurgency aircraft
