= StreetScooter C16 =

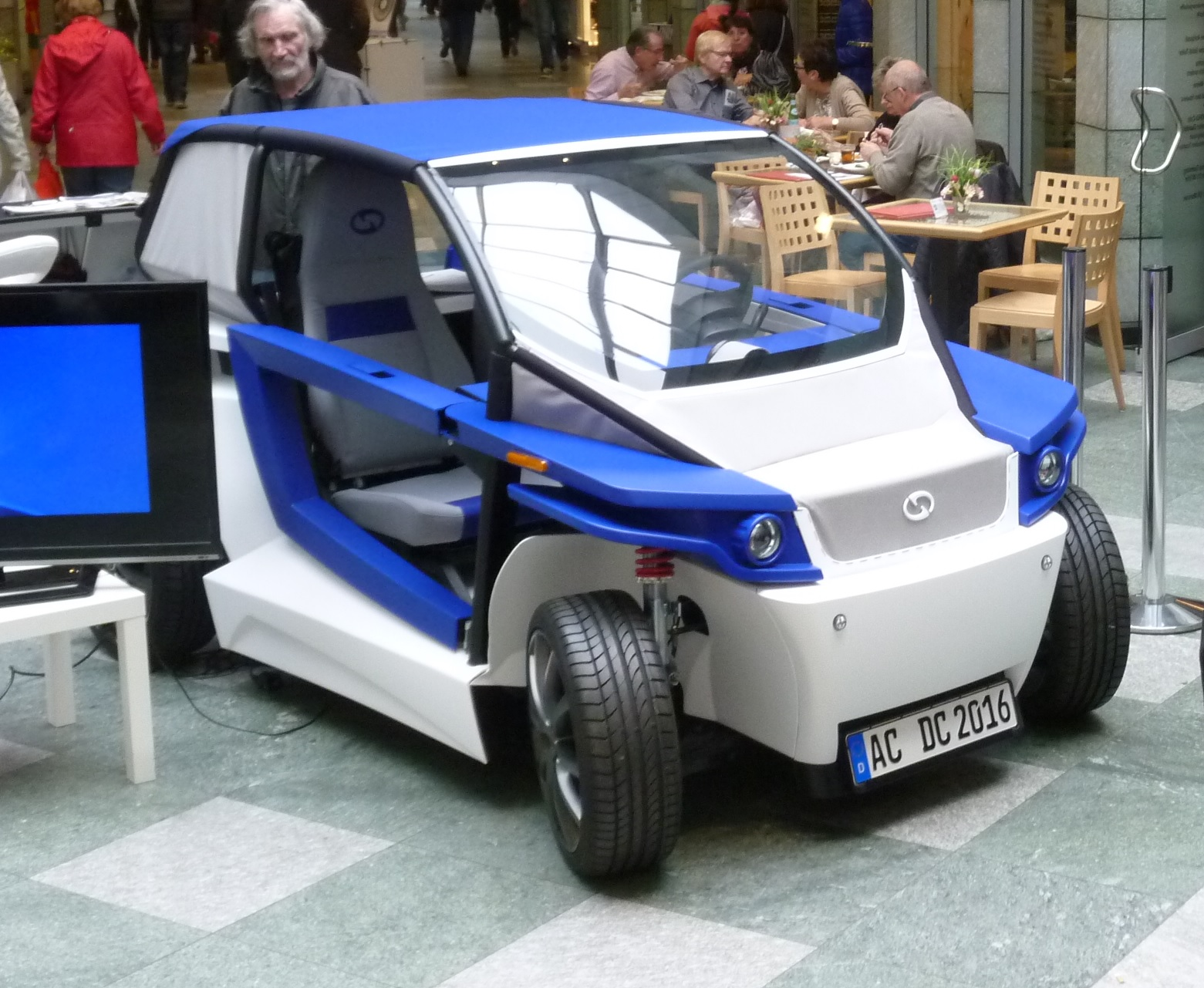
StreetScooter C16

The StreetScooter C16 was an electric car shown in 2014 by the electric vehicle manufacturer StreetScooter (otherwise known for making electric commercial vehicles).

It basically was put into production as the E.GO Life from 2019 to 2024.

== Makeup ==
The 2-seater city car had a metal frame, however all of its exterior plastic parts were 3D-printed on the Objet1000 printer by Stratasys using ABS polymer. The production vehicle was meant to weigh about 450 kg without the battery, have a minimum range of 100 km, reach a top speed of 100 km/h and have a price tag of under 10,000 EUR.

== Release ==
The vehicle was shown at the EuroMold in Frankfurt in 2014.
