= E.GO Life =

e.GO Life
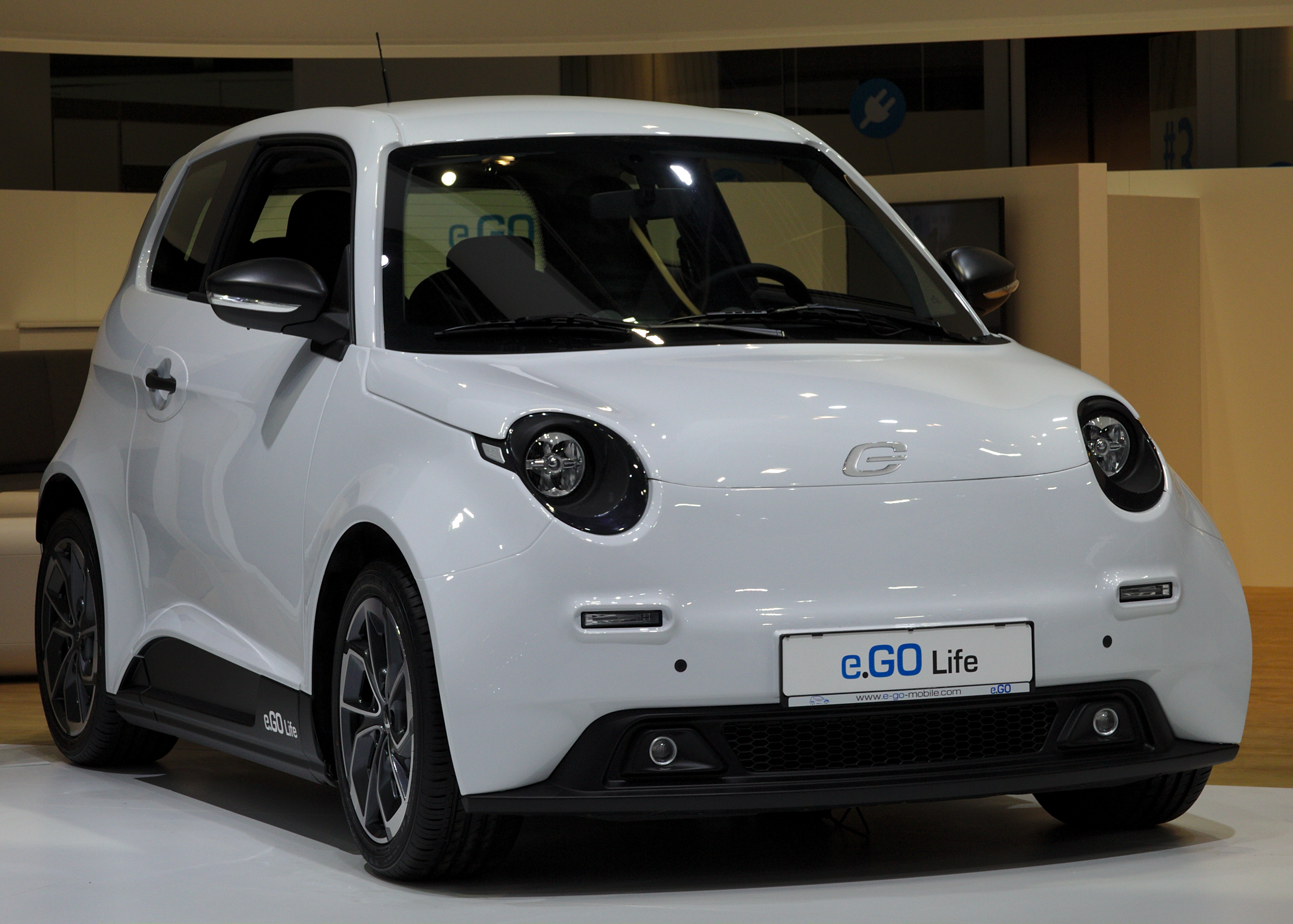
- e.GO Life at the 2019 Geneva Motor Show

Overview
- Manufacturer: e.GO
- Production: March 2019–2024
- Assembly: Germany: Aachen; Bulgaria: Lovech

Body and chassis
- Class: City car (A)
- Body style: 3-door hatchback

Powertrain
- Electric motor: 20–60 kW electric motor

Dimensions
- Wheelbase: 2,200 mm (86.6 in)
- Length: 3,348 mm (131.8 in)
- Width: 1,748 mm (68.8 in)
- Height: 1,581 mm (62.2 in)
- Curb weight: 880–950 kg (1,940–2,094 lb)

The e.GO Life is an electrically powered, four-seater microcar from Next.e.GO Mobile SE in Aachen, which had been in production since April 2019, It has a battery capacity of 21,5 kWh with a range of 140 km (WLTP), but offers no fast charging for road trips. The aluminium space frame chassis and thermoplastic outer skin makes it not only very durable but also sustainable. The production for the e.GO Life started in 2019 and the first cars were delivered to customers in May 2019. After a relaunch, it was discontinued by 2024.

== History ==
Until June 2021, the manufacturer's managing director was Günther Schuh, who was already involved in the founding of StreetScooter GmbH. The development of the e.GO vehicle models takes place on the campus of the RWTH Aachen, where Schuh is a professor for production systematics. The e.GO Life was originally planned as a light electric vehicle, but the concept was further developed into a class M1 passenger car. The final look of the vehicle, for which Italian designer Paolo Spada is responsible, was presented in March 2017 at CeBIT in Hanover.

In April 2017 it was announced that the production plant was to be built in the east of Aachen, on the former Philips site, and that construction work had already begun. On September 16, 2017, the company announced that there were already 1,200 pre-orders and that the e.GO Life should come onto the market in three performance variants from summer 2018 after discussion with customers. Production was originally scheduled to start in May 2018 and delivery in October 2018. In July 2018, the first factory was opened.

The production model of the vehicle was presented to the public for the first time at the Geneva Motor Show in March 2019.

The e.GO Life has been available for pre-order since May 18, 2017. Initially, 1,000 First Edition vehicles were to be produced in 2019; For technical and legal reasons, these vehicles should be throttled to 53 kW and delivered without regenerative braking.

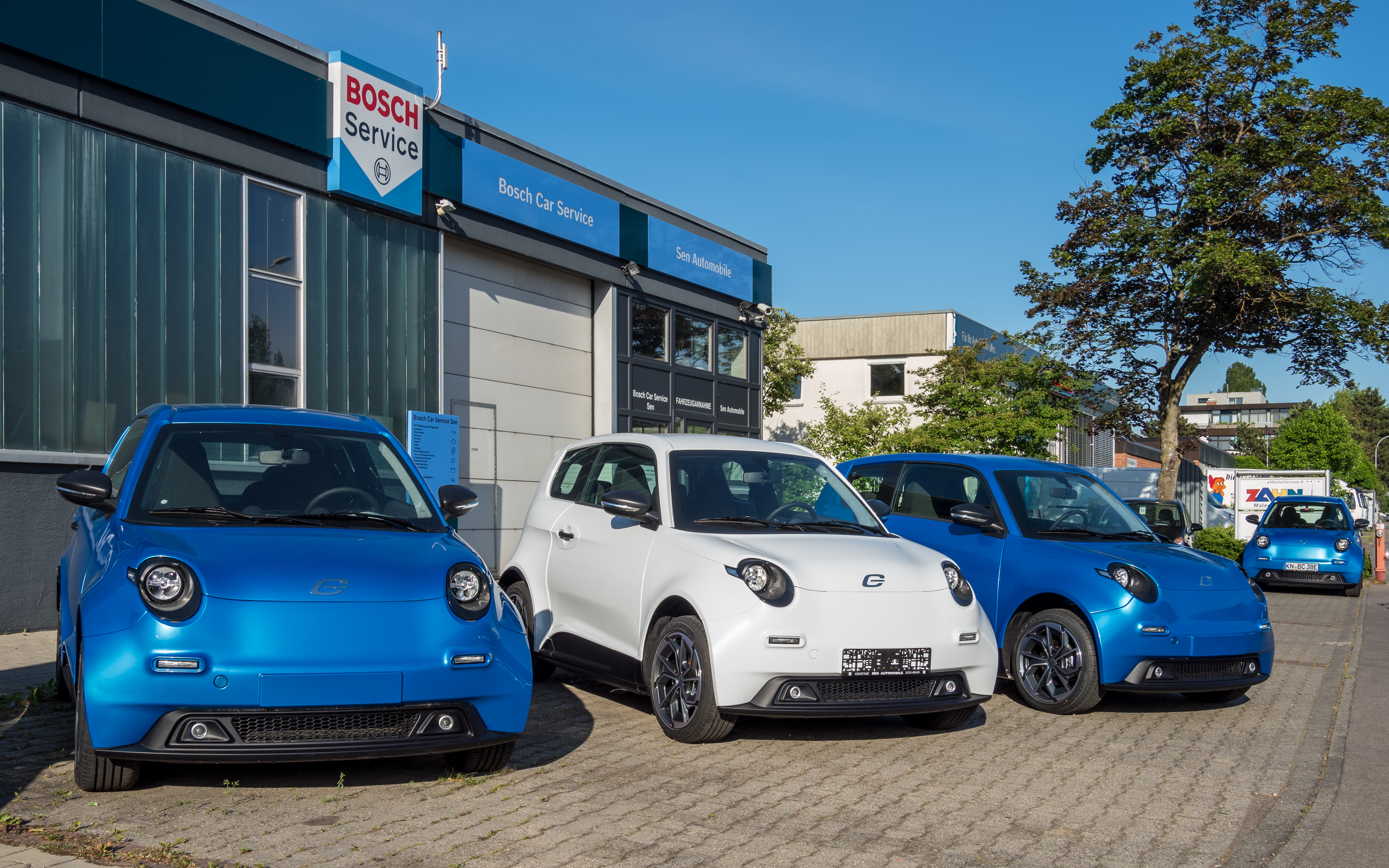
e.GO Life offers in Konstanz (2020)

Series production started in March 2019. On April 26, 2019, all the necessary homologation tests for a European small series approval of the e.GO Life First Edition were completed with the last test being passed. The first production vehicles were then delivered on May 8, 2019. On July 1, 2019, the Federal Office of Economics and Export Control (BAFA) put the e.GO Life on the list of eligible vehicles. A total of 126 funding applications for an e.Go Life were submitted by December 1, 2019.

In 2019, 540 vehicles were sold. The e.GO Life should be offered in three performance levels from 2020. As of 2019, the list price of the basic model with 20 kW (27 hp) should be 17,900 euros. However, in November 2019 it was announced that the prices of the 2020 models will increase compared to the prices announced in 2019 due to special editions and the higher environmental bonus.

== Overview ==
The e.GO Life is designed as a city car and second car. The vehicle is rear-wheel drive and is a 2+2 seater. The weight of the e.GO Life 20 is 1,150 kg (2,540 lb) with the battery. The car has a space frame. The rolling chassis of the car is made of aluminum profiles and sheets, reinforced with steel in some places and clad with colored plastic panels. The front wheels are individually suspended on MacPherson struts and control arms, and a rigid De Dion axle designed as a U-shaped drawbar axle is installed at the rear. Disc brakes are installed on all wheels.

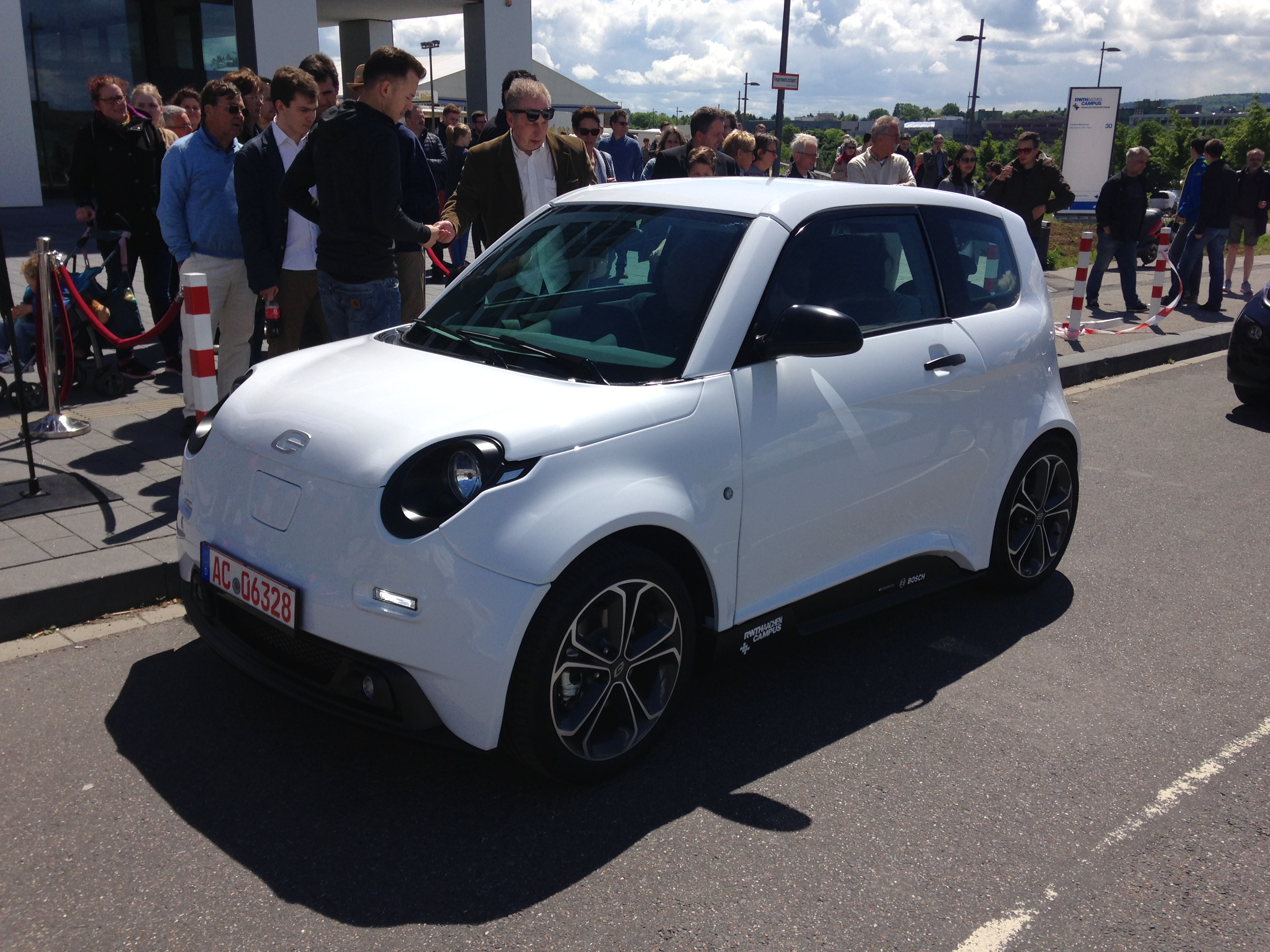
Front view

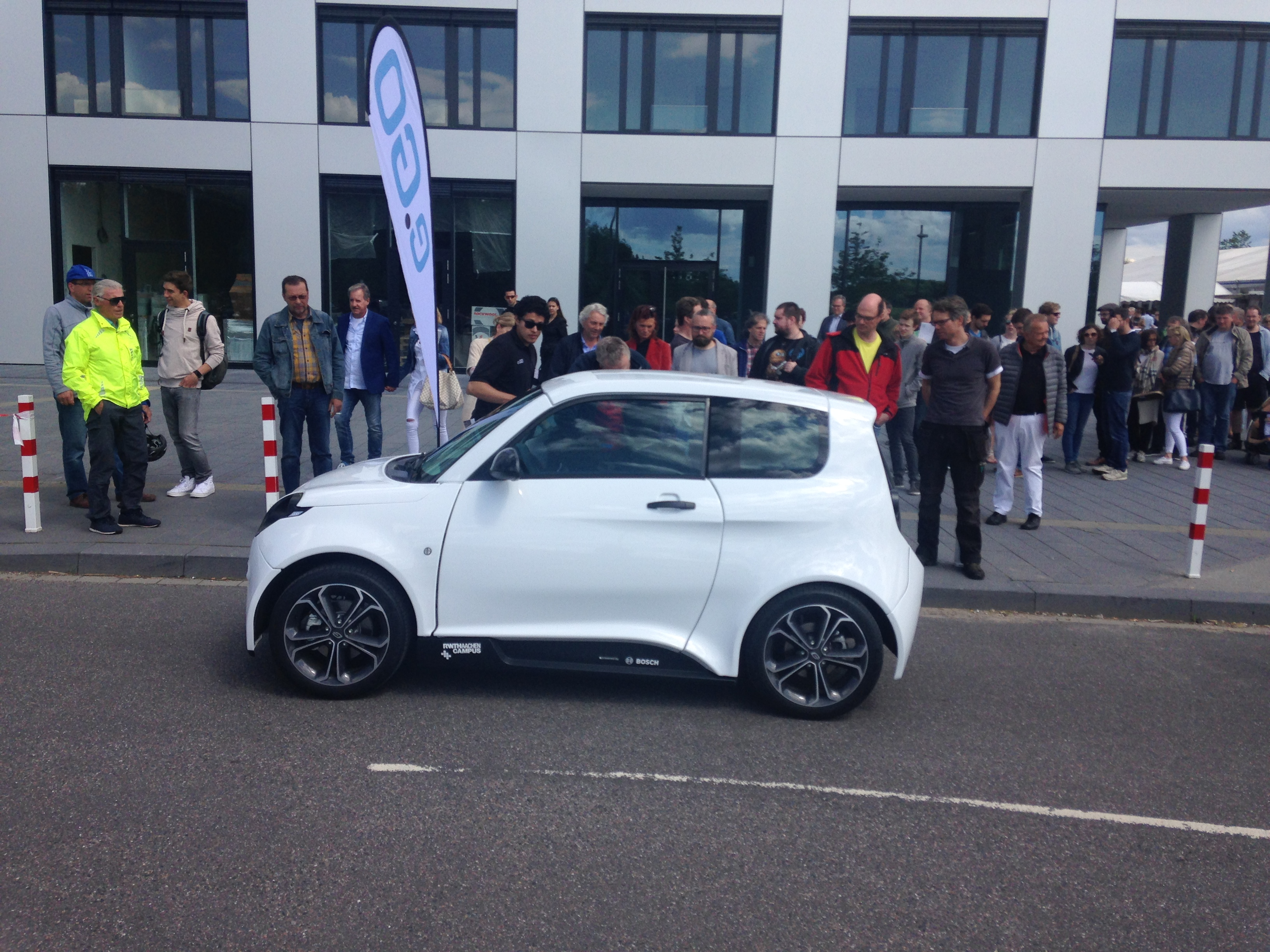
Side view

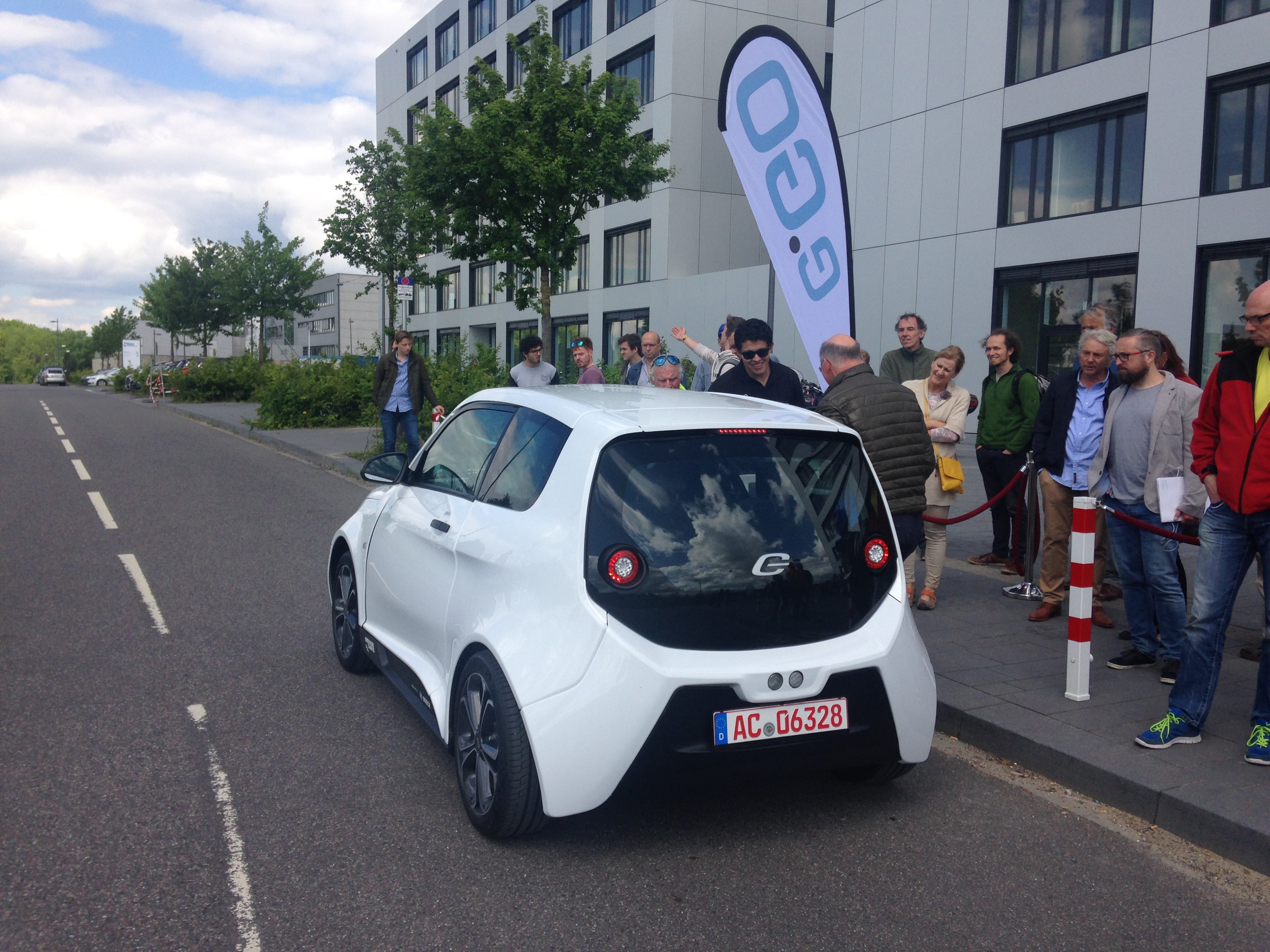
Rear view

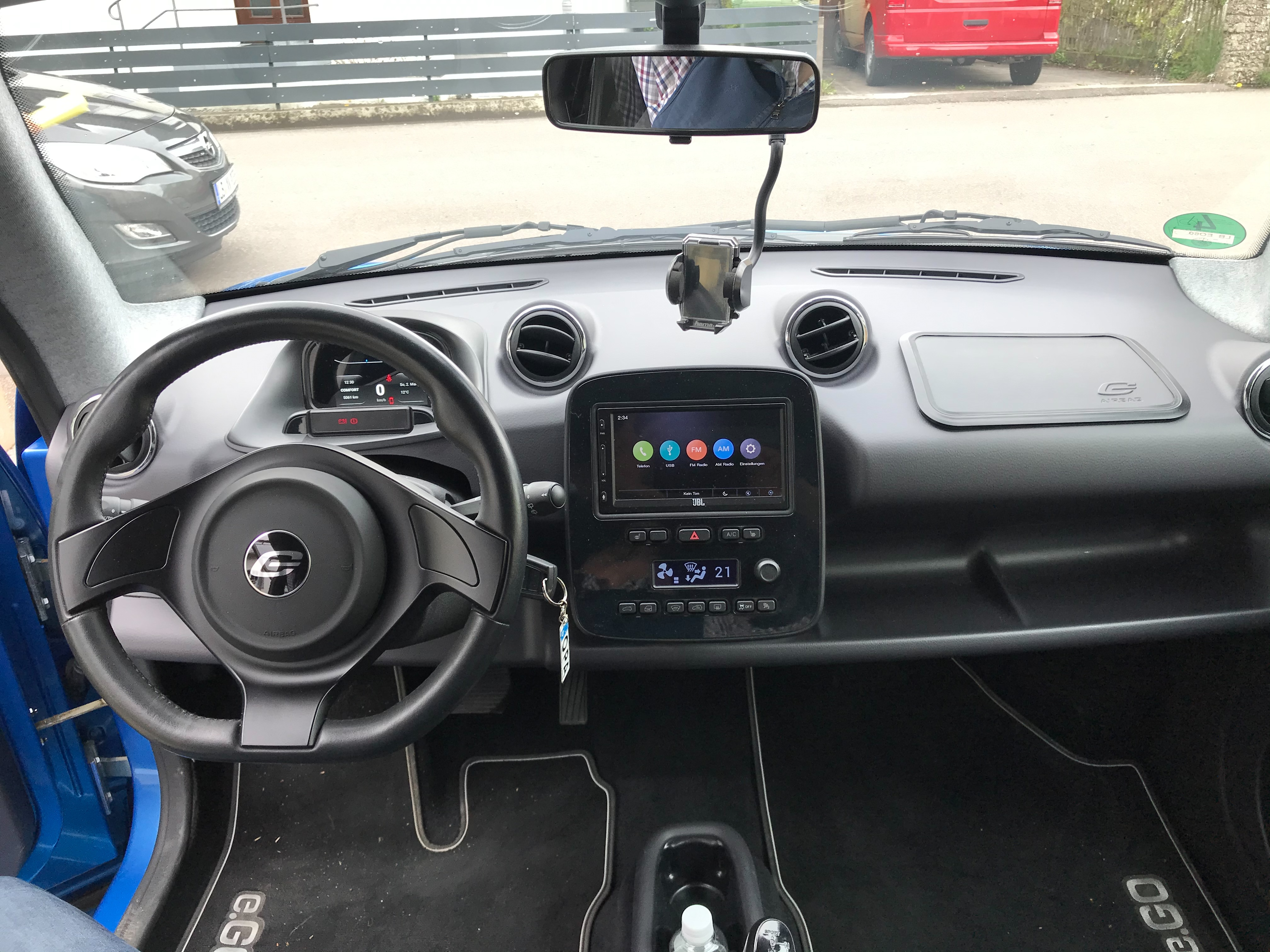
Interior

== Other models ==
=== e.GO Life Sport ===
A performance-enhanced concept vehicle of the vehicle was presented with the Concept Sport.

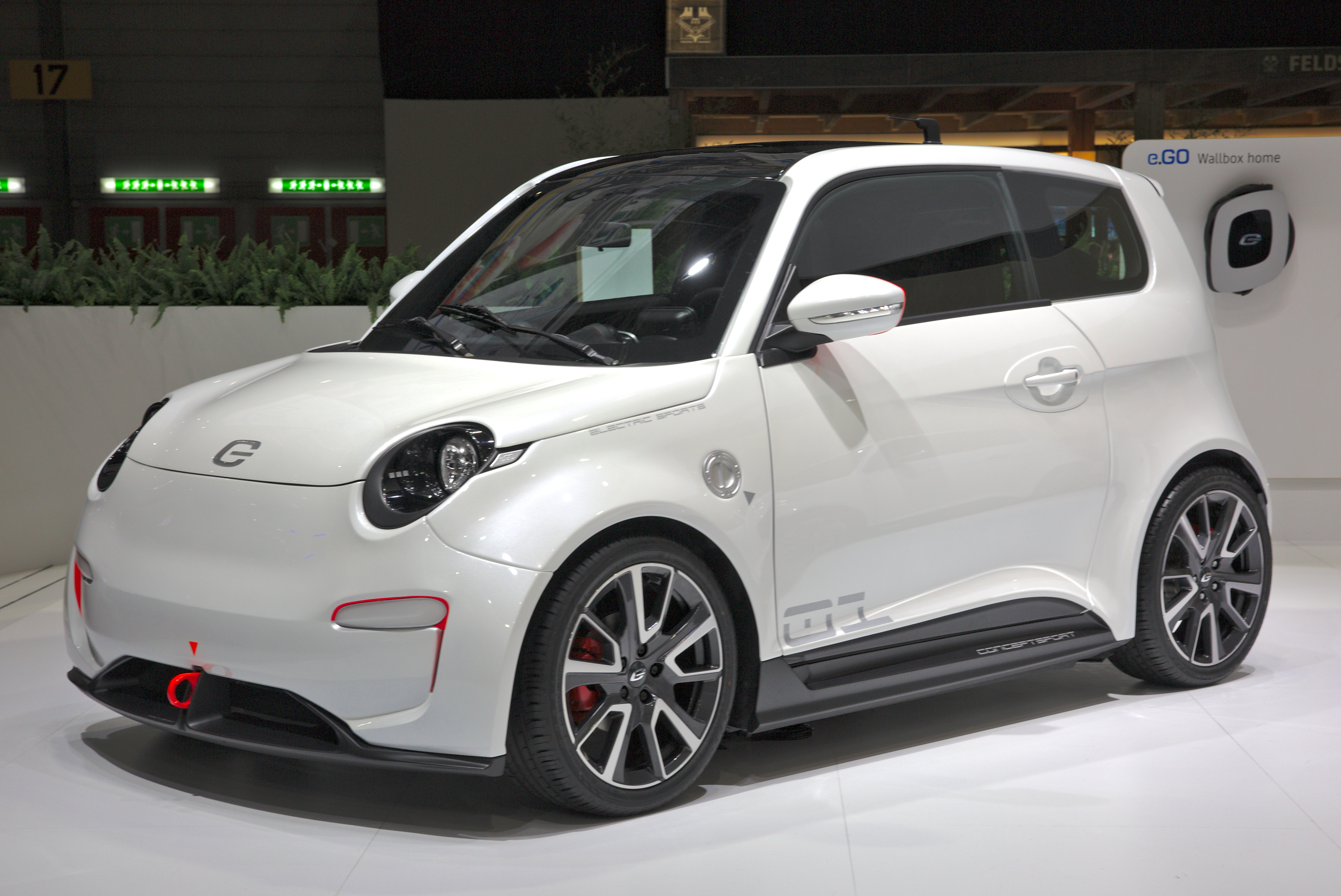
e.GO Life Concept Sport at the 2019 Geneva Motor Show

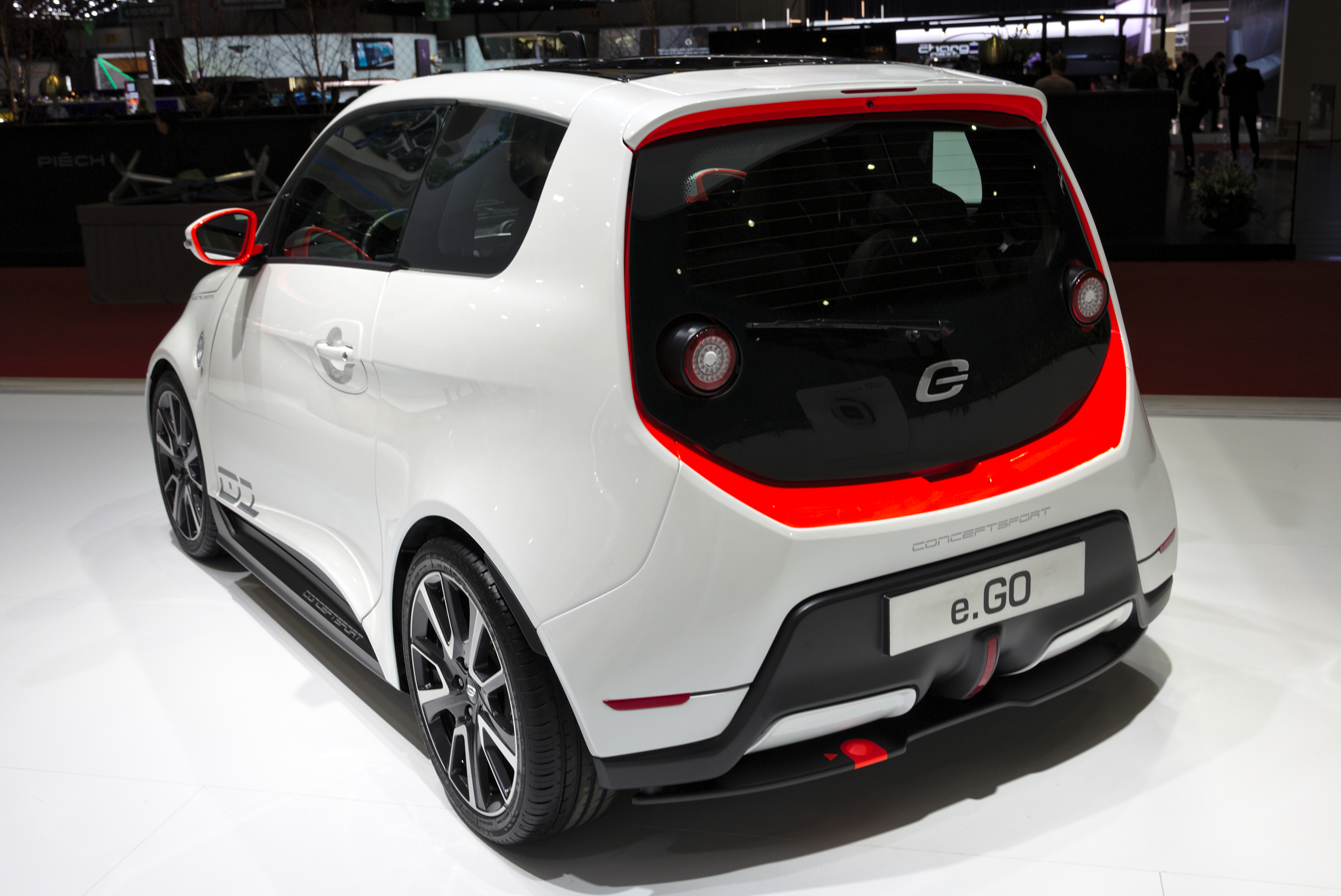
Rear view

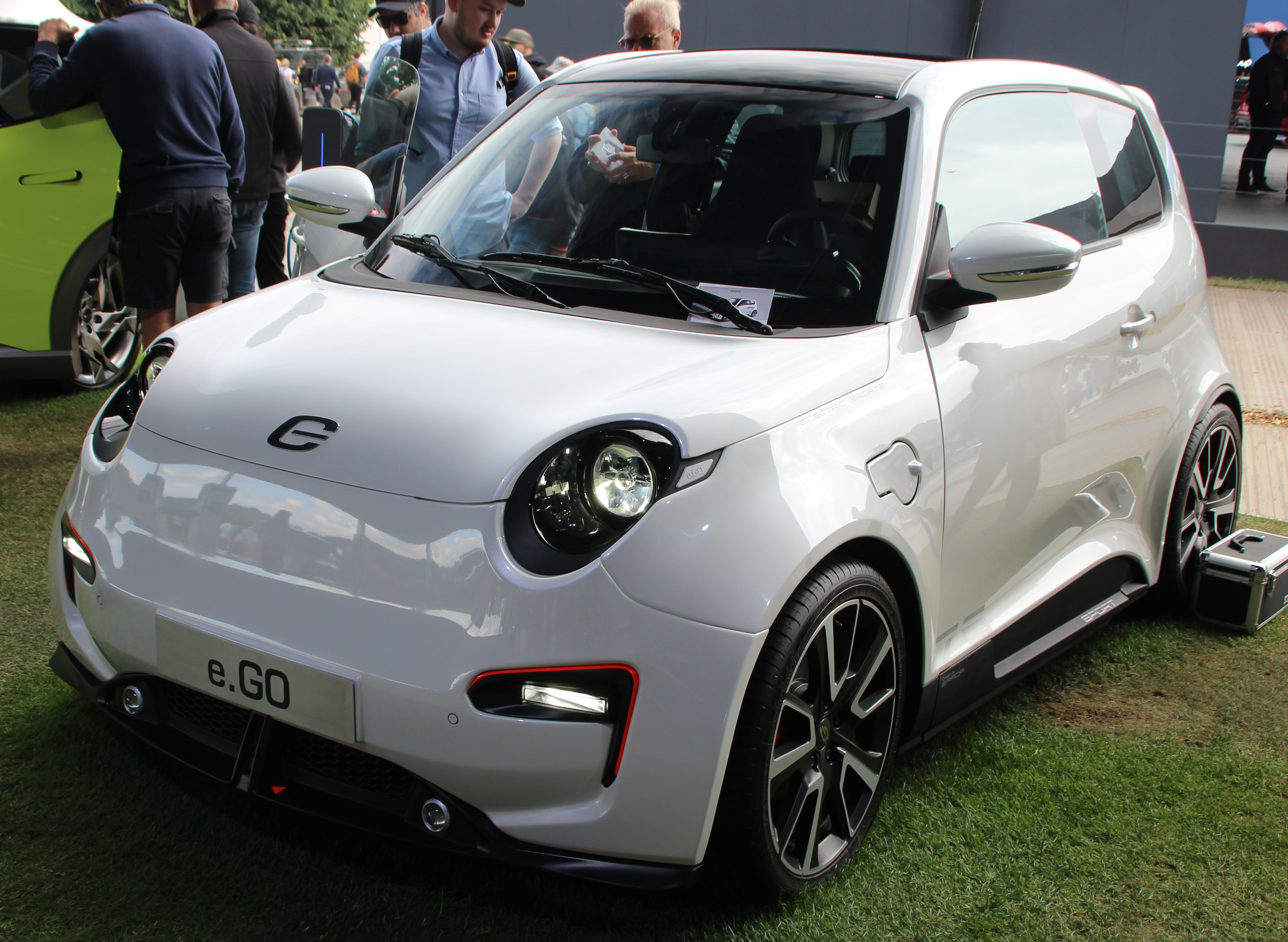
e.GO Life Sport at the 2022 Goodwood FOS

=== e.wave X ===
The presentation of the e.GO Life Concept Cross study was cancelled due to the COVID-19 pandemic. In May 2022, the significantly revised electric car e.wave X was presented.

Sales of the e.wave X began on October 17, 2022, after it was unveiled at the 2022 Paris Motor Show.

It has a battery capacity of 30.4 kWh, an electric range (WLTP) of 157 mi (253 km), a maximum power of 86 kW (115 hp) and a maximum speed of 84 mph (135 km/h).

== Technology ==
=== Engine and battery ===
The e.GO Life should initially have a 48-volt drive system from the automotive supplier Robert Bosch GmbH. However, following customer requests, a high-voltage system was rescheduled. Bosch supplies the electric motor, the control unit, the charger, the display and the battery. After-sales service is to be provided by the Bosch Car Service outlets.

=== Charging capacity ===
The e.GO Life can be charged at the household socket with a normal Schuko plug. The maximum charging power is 2.3 kW (230 V, 10 A). In order to be able to charge the battery faster, the e.GO Life is equipped with a type 2 plug. At launch, however, the maximum charging power of the battery was limited to 3.7 kW (230 V, 16 A, single-phase). This means that enough energy can be charged in one hour for approx. 24 km of additional driving distance with standard consumption.

e.GO offers the "wallbox home" wall charging station for at home at a price of 549 euros (as of November 2018) to charge the battery with a type 2 plug (a 5-meter cable is included). The "wallbox" charging station has a maximum charging capacity of 11 kW (according to the manufacturer "for future vehicle generations of the e.GO family").

== Technical specifications ==
The manufacturer information as of September 16, 2017, March 2019, January 2020 and June 2020:

	e.GO Life First Edition	e.GO Life 20	e.GO Life 40+	e.GO Life 60
Period	March 2019 – January 2020	2020–2024	May 2020–2024	January 2020–2024
Maximum power	53 kW (72 PS)	20 kW (27 PS)	41 kW	57 kW (77 PS)
Continuous power	25 kW	20 kW	24 kW	29 kW
Acceleration, 0–50 km/h	3,5 s	7,7 s	4,7 s	4,3 s
Acceleration, 0–100 km/h		35,0 s	12,0 s	?
Top speed	132 km/h	112 km/h	120 km/h	130 km/h
Electricity consumption per 100 km (combined according to WLTP)	24,2 kWh	14,5 kWh	15,5 kWh	15,5 kWh
Battery capacity	21,5 kWh	14,5 kWh	17,5 kWh	21,5 kWh
Range (WLTP combined)	89 km	100 km	113 km	139 km
Range (WLTP City)		104 km	124 km	206 km
Charging time AC 2.3 kW 100% (Schuko) Charging time AC 3,6 kW 100% (Type 2) Charging time DC up to 80% (CCS)	9,6 h 6,0 h –	5,4 h 3,8 h –	7,3 h 4,5 h –	9,6 h 6,0 h –
Curb weight	1.231 kg	1.150 kg	1.170 kg	1.231 kg
Price (incl. VAT) (as of November 2020)	€24.650	unknown	€22.701	€25.041

== Sales ==
According to the Federal Motor Transport Authority, the first e.GO brand vehicle was registered in May 2019. In the period from May to November 2019, a total of 103 e.GO Life First Edition vehicles were registered in Germany. In 2019 as a whole, 171 vehicles of the brand were newly registered. In 2020, 477 e.GO Life were newly registered. In 2021 there were 123 models.

Year	Number
2019	171
2020	477
2021	123
Registration figures in Germany, source: Federal Motor Transport Authority

By the end of 2020, 546 applications for the "Life First Edition" and 129 applications for the "Life First Edition Mj. 2020" were submitted.
