= B-ON Max =

Electric van produced by B-ON

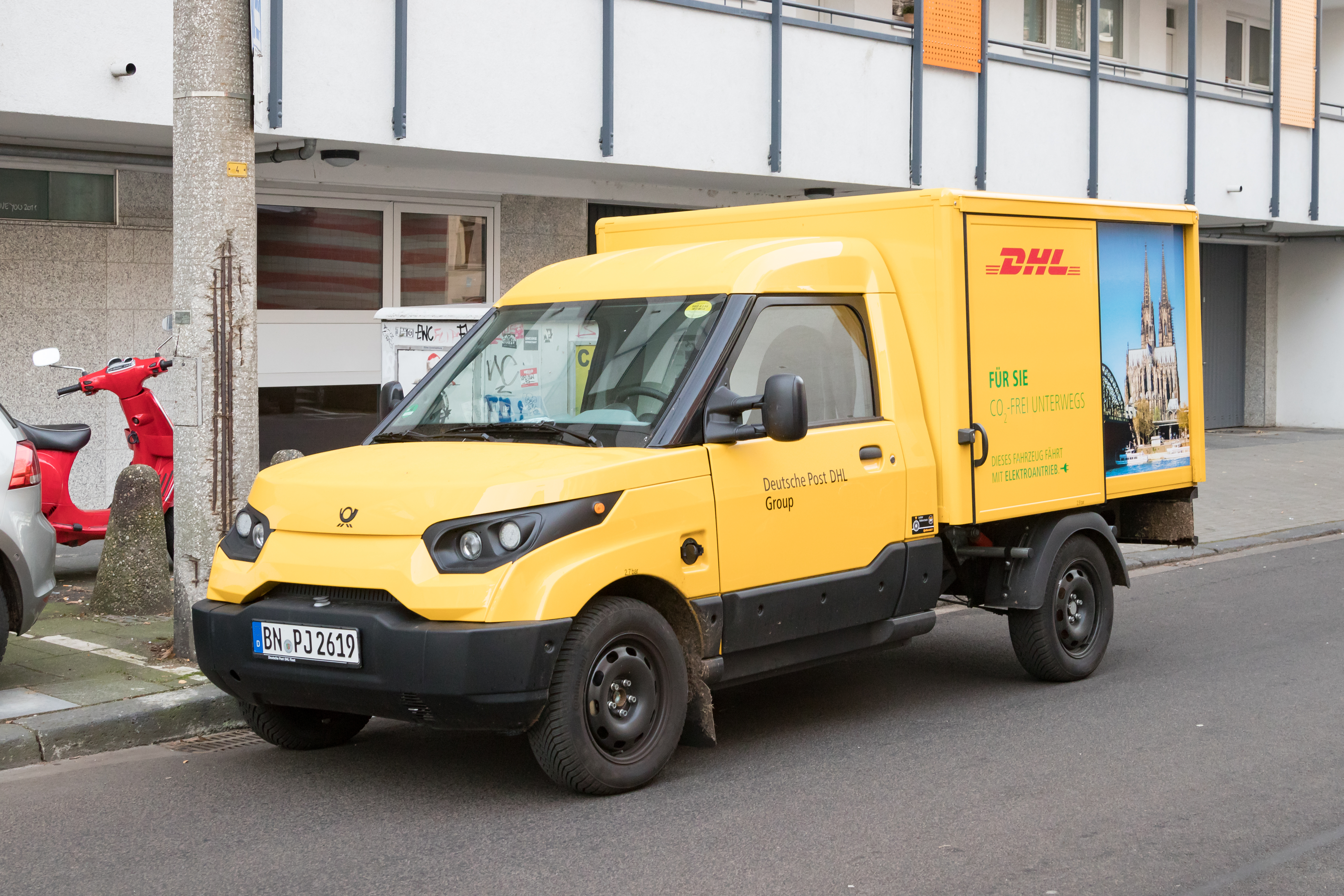

Overview
- Manufacturer: B-ON (Note: StreetScooter (2014–2022))
- Also called: StreetScooter Work (2014-2022)
- Production: 2014-present
- Assembly: Aachen, Germany; Düren, Germany; Moreno Valley, California, U.S.

Body and chassis
- Class: Light duty truck
- Body style: 2-door panel van; 2-door pickup truck
- Layout: FF

Powertrain
- Electric motor: permanent-magnet synchronous, 64 hp (48 kW)
- Transmission: single-speed reduction gear
- Electric range: 101–205 km (63–127 mi) (EPA)

Dimensions
- Wheelbase: 2,800 mm (110 in) (Work/Max); 3,800 mm (150 in) (Work L/Giga)
- Length: 4,710 mm (185 in) (Work/Max); 5,780 mm (228 in) (Work L/Giga)
- Width: 2,090 mm (82 in)
- Height: 2,040 mm (80 in) (Work/Max); 2,350 mm (93 in) (Work L/Giga)
- Curb weight: 2,180 kg (4,806 lb) (Work/Max); 2,600 kg (5,732 lb) (Work L/Giga)

The B-ON Max is a line of battery electric delivery vans and pickup trucks produced by B-ON. It was previously produced under the German brand StreetScooter as the StreetScooter Work from 2014 to 2022 and has been produced under the B-ON brand since 2022.

== History ==
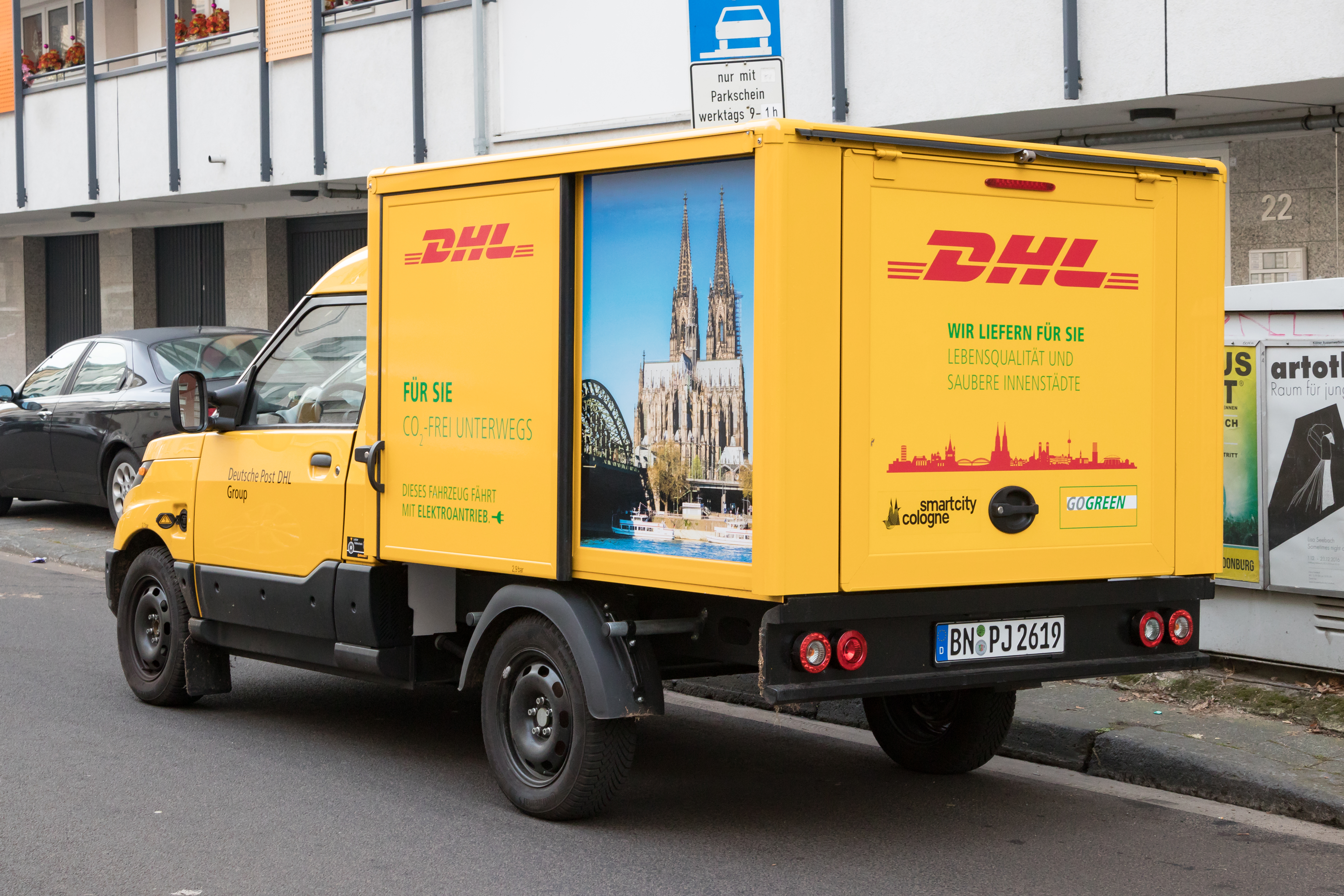
Rear view of StreetScooter Work

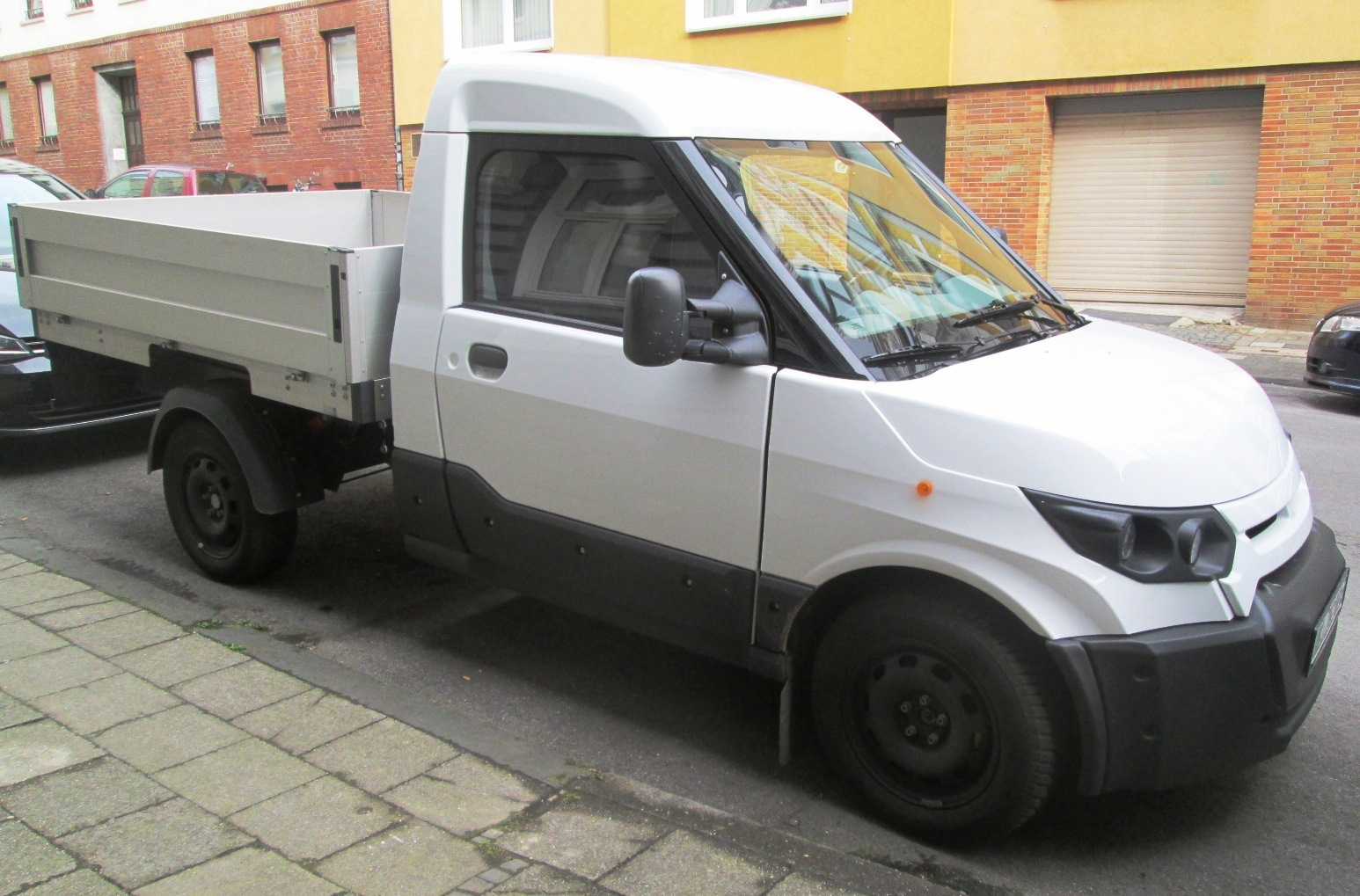
StreetScooter Work Pickup

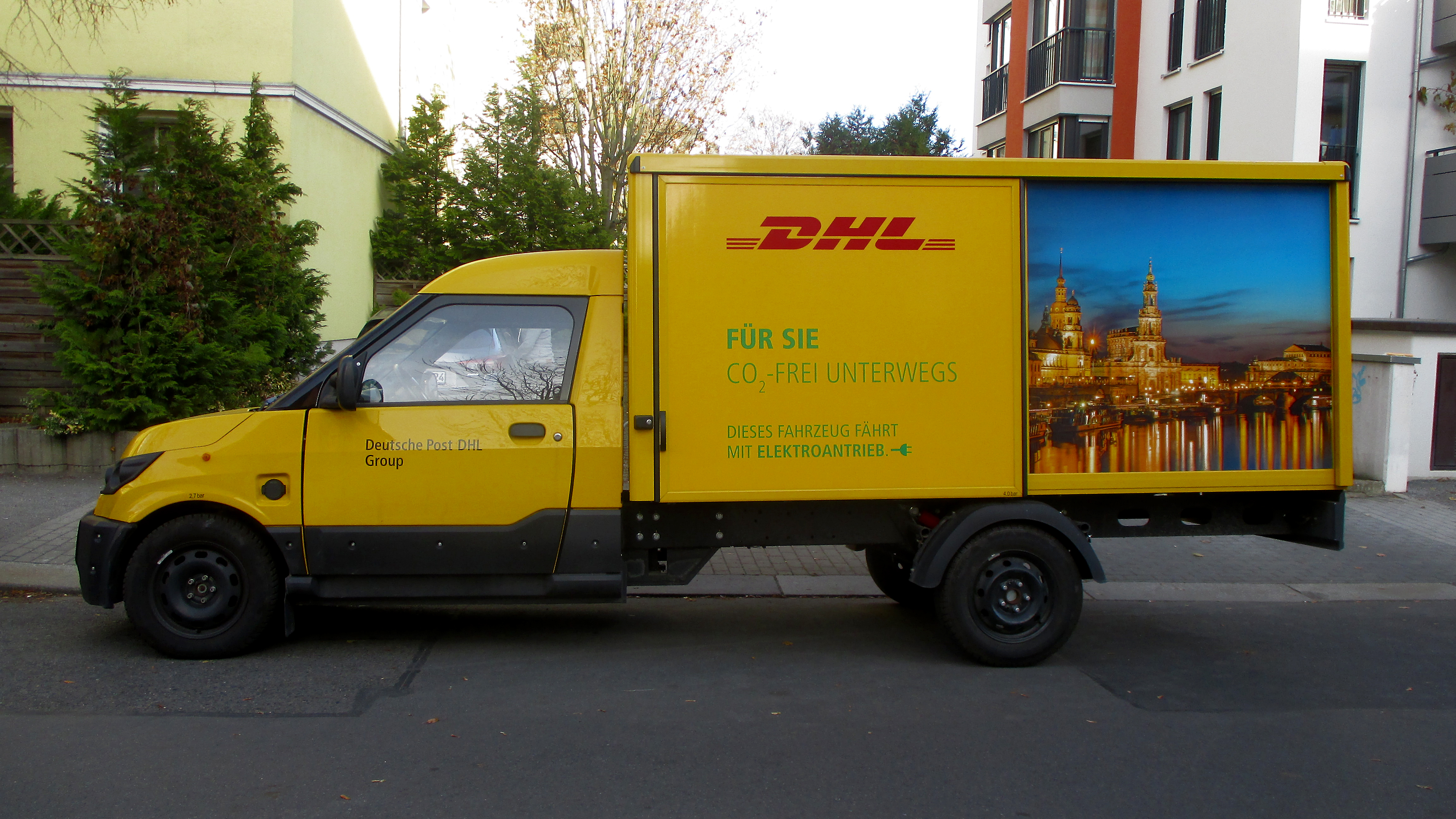
StreetScooter Work L

In the spring of 2014, the German startup StreetScooter presented its flagship project in the form of a compact electric van. The Work model took the form of a van with a two-box, two-door and two-seat body with the transport part arranged in three different ways depending on the customer's preferences: box with the commercial nickname Box, open with sides called Pickup or as a chassis without a factory superstructure called Pure.

The characteristic features of the StreetScooter Work's appearance were the aggressively stylized headlights, which were mostly made of plastic filling with lenses embedded in it. In addition, the bodywork is finished with dark plastic overlays on the bumpers, wheel arches and sills, which are easy to replace in the event of abrasion or damage.

The passenger compartment was finished with gray-toned materials. In front of the driver there is a color digital display showing, among other things, speed and range data. In addition, the vehicle is equipped with a multimedia system with Bluetooth smartphone connectivity.

=== Work L/Giga ===
In September 2016, during the IAA Commercial Vehicles car show in Frankfurt, an elongated variant called StreetScooter Work L, now called the B-ON Giga, was presented, which went on sale in all three ways of building the transport compartment. It gained a significantly extended wheelbase, which translated into a 1.7-meter longer body. The car made it possible to transport up to 150 parcels of regular dimensions in the transport compartment, with a load capacity of 1,000 kilograms. To cope with the higher gross weight and larger body, the Work L has a more powerful electric motor and a larger lithium-ion battery, enabling it to travel up to 100 kilometers more on a single charge.

=== 2019 update ===
In October 2019, the Work and Work L underwent extensive restyling, which brought visual changes to the appearance of the front fascia. There were lower-set, rounder headlight housings, as well as an additional air intake located in the center of the bumper with space for the company logo or Deutsche Post logo in the case of a fleet for this buyer. The upgrade also brought more standard equipment, including automatic air conditioning, heated seats and connectivity to the eCall emergency system. The vehicle is also equipped with a more modern multimedia system that provides connectivity with Apple CarPlay and Android Auto interfaces. StreetScooter has additionally introduced a larger transport compartment with greater load capacity.

=== Change of name ===
In January 2022, Detusche Post sold StreetScooter to a new owner. Luxembourg's Odin Automotive continued to produce the Work/Work L models until May 2022 under the StreetScooter name, and then rebranded the vehicle with the new name of the manufacturer. After it was renamed B-ON, the delivery van received new logos and the name B-ON Max for the shorter variant and B-ON Giga for the elongated variant.

== Specifications ==
The Max and Giga models share the same technical parameters. All are equipped with an electric motor driving the front axle with a power of 66 HP, a maximum torque of 200 Nm and a top speed limited to 85 km/h (53 mph). The manufacturer made it possible to choose between batteries with a capacity of 20 or 40 kWh, offering respectively a maximum range on a single charge of approx. 101 or 205 kilometers.

== Sales ==
The Max was built with fleet buyers in mind. The main one was the German logistics and postal company Deutsche Post together with the parent courier company DHL, to which most of the produced copies were delivered after the acquisition of the StreetScooter, delivering 11,000 copies from 2016 to 2020. In February 2023, B-ON announced that it had reached an agreement with the American company Karma Automotive under the production for the needs of the local market at the Moreno Valley plant in California.
