= E.GO Mobile =

German electric vehicle startup

Next.e.GO Mobile SE
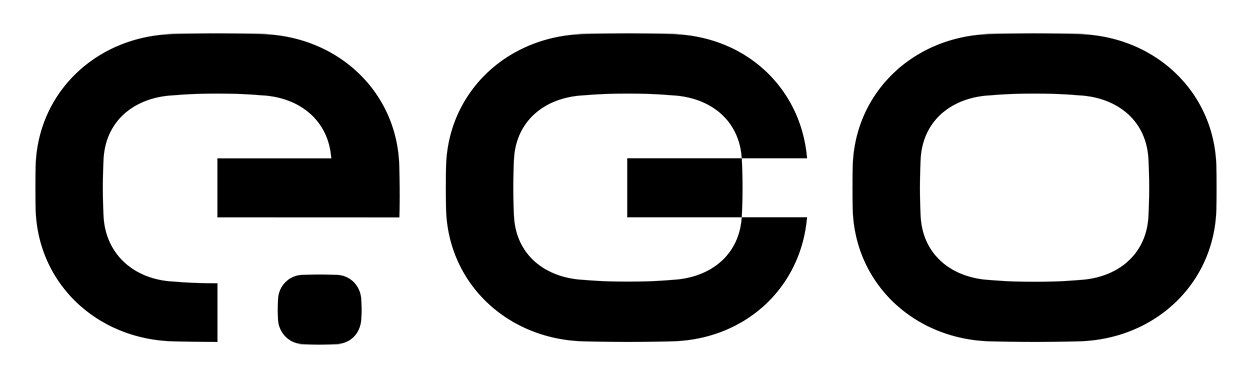
- Type: Public company
- Industry: Automotive
- Predecessor: e.GO Mobile AG
- Founded: 19 March 2015
- Founder: Prof. Günther Schuh
- Defunct: 29 May 2024
- Fate: Bankruptcy
- Headquarters: Aachen, Germany,
- Key people: Ali Vezvaei Chairman of the Administrative Board; Martin Klein (CEO); Prof. Dr. Ulrich Hermann (Member of the Administrative Board); Theodor Determann (CFO); Dr. Stefan Rudolf (CTO); Ariane Martini (CHRO)
- Number of employees: 400
- Website: www.e-go-mobile.com

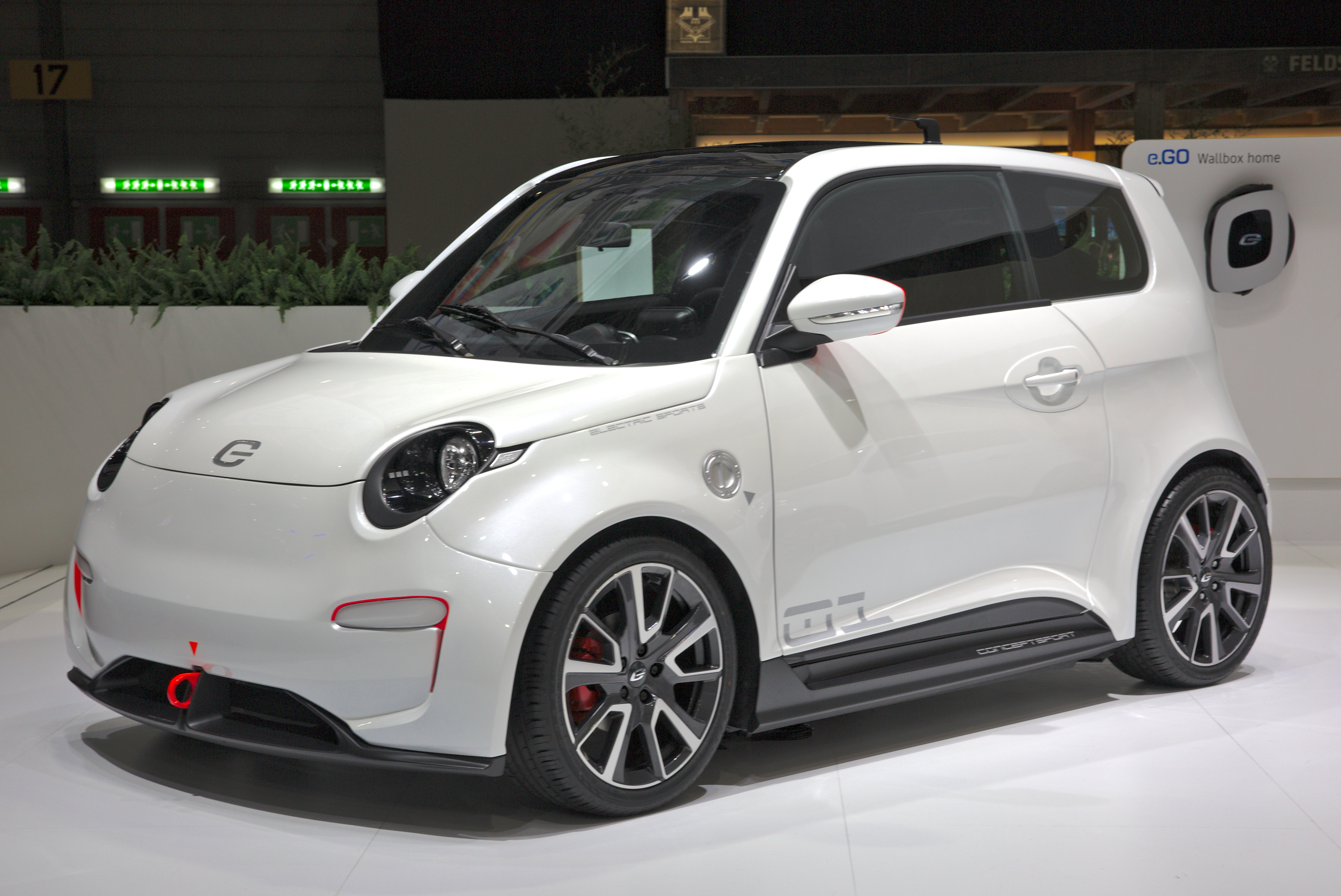
e.GO Life "sport concept" at the 2019 Geneva Motor Show

Next.e.GO Mobile SE was a German manufacturer of electric vehicles and sustainable mobility systems based in Aachen. It was founded in 2015 as e.GO Mobile AG by RWTH Aachen-professor Günther Schuh. Schuh co-founded the electric van company StreetScooter in 2010, which was acquired by Deutsche Post AG in 2014. The company has announced a merger with Athena SPACs and intends to go public on the NYSE. Next.e.GO Mobile SE filed for insolvency in March 2024 and ceased operations and was liquidated in May 2024.

== History ==
In March 2017 the first prototype of the electric four-seater city e.GO Life was presented to the public at the expo CeBIT in Hannover. Since May 2017 reservations for the e.GO Life were possible and reached a volume of 3.200 pre-orders in April 2018. The factory for the e.GO Life was opened in July 2018 with an expected output of 10.000-30.000 vehicles per year. The delivery of the first cars started in May 2019 where Armin Laschet, Minister-President of the state of North Rhine-Westphalia, Prof. Ulrich Rüdiger, rector of RWTH Aachen University, and Marcel Philipp, lord mayor of the city of Aachen, were among the first to receive an e.GO Life. Since then and up until Q1 2020 over 500 e.GO Life First Edition were delivered to customers.

Due to supply chain and financing problems caused by the COVID-19 pandemic, the e.GO Mobile AG had to file for a self-administered insolvency in April 2020. This process was successfully completed in September 2020 as nd Industrial Investment B.V. joined as a majority shareholder in the newly founded next.e.GO Mobile SE. On September 1, 2020, Next.e.GO Mobile SE took over the entire business of e.GO Mobile AG including all subsidiaries. The restart of the production is expected in early 2021.

In December 2020 Enterprise Greece, the Greek state investment and trade promotion agency, and Next.e.GO Mobile SE have reached initial agreement on establishing an electric vehicle production facility in Greece. This second production facility serves as a next step in the internationalisation plans of e.GO and the full project is expected to be finished within 24 months.

On July 10, 2021, the Bulgarian Minister of Economy Kiril Petkov and e.GO Mobile SE CEO Ulrich Hermann have signed an investment agreement for a Bulgarian production line. The electrical car plant will be built with technical expert support from the RWTH Aachen University. Planned capacity is to exceed 30 000 units per year of the e.GO Life 70, e.GO Life Sport and the e.Go Life Cross models. Local partner of the project is Kiril Domuschiev, the owner of the factory location in Lovech, the Balkan factory. According to Minister Petkov three other countries in the region were contenders for the manufacturing location, offering greater stimulus to the German company, but what the factors, which lead to Bulgaria winning the investment were the record time of the negotiations and Bulgaria's ever-growing car manufacturing supply sector. The negotiations were started and concluded in the span of five weeks. Most of the components for the electric vehicles will be sourced in the country, with major subcontractors being the Bulgarian divisions of ETEM (aluminium bodywork), Robert Bosch GmbH (software) and Yazaki (electrical wiring).

=== Final bankruptcy and liquidation ===
In March 2024 the company filed for bankruptcy again. On 29 May 2024, it was announced that the company would be liquidated. According to the insolvency administrator, business operations will be discontinued and the company is to be liquidated. The liquidation was unavoidable “because, despite intensive efforts, no buyer could be found to take over the financing until the new e.wave X model was ready for production,” the insolvency administrator explained in a letter to German media. When the company filed for insolvency in March 2024, 320 employees were still working for e.GO. Some have since left the company. The remaining 200 employees will be made redundant “in the near future.” As of June 2024, all operations ceased, the entire company and all physical assets at the Aachen plant were put up for auction and all staff and employees were effectively let go.

== Models ==
=== e.GO Life ===
The first generation of the electric four-seater city car, in production since April 2019, has a range of 140 km [WLTP] and a battery capacity of 21,5 kWh. The aluminium space frame chassis and thermoplastic outer skin makes it not only very durable but also sustainable. The production for the e.GO Life started in 2019 and the first cars were delivered to customers in May 2019.

==== e.GO Life Sport ====
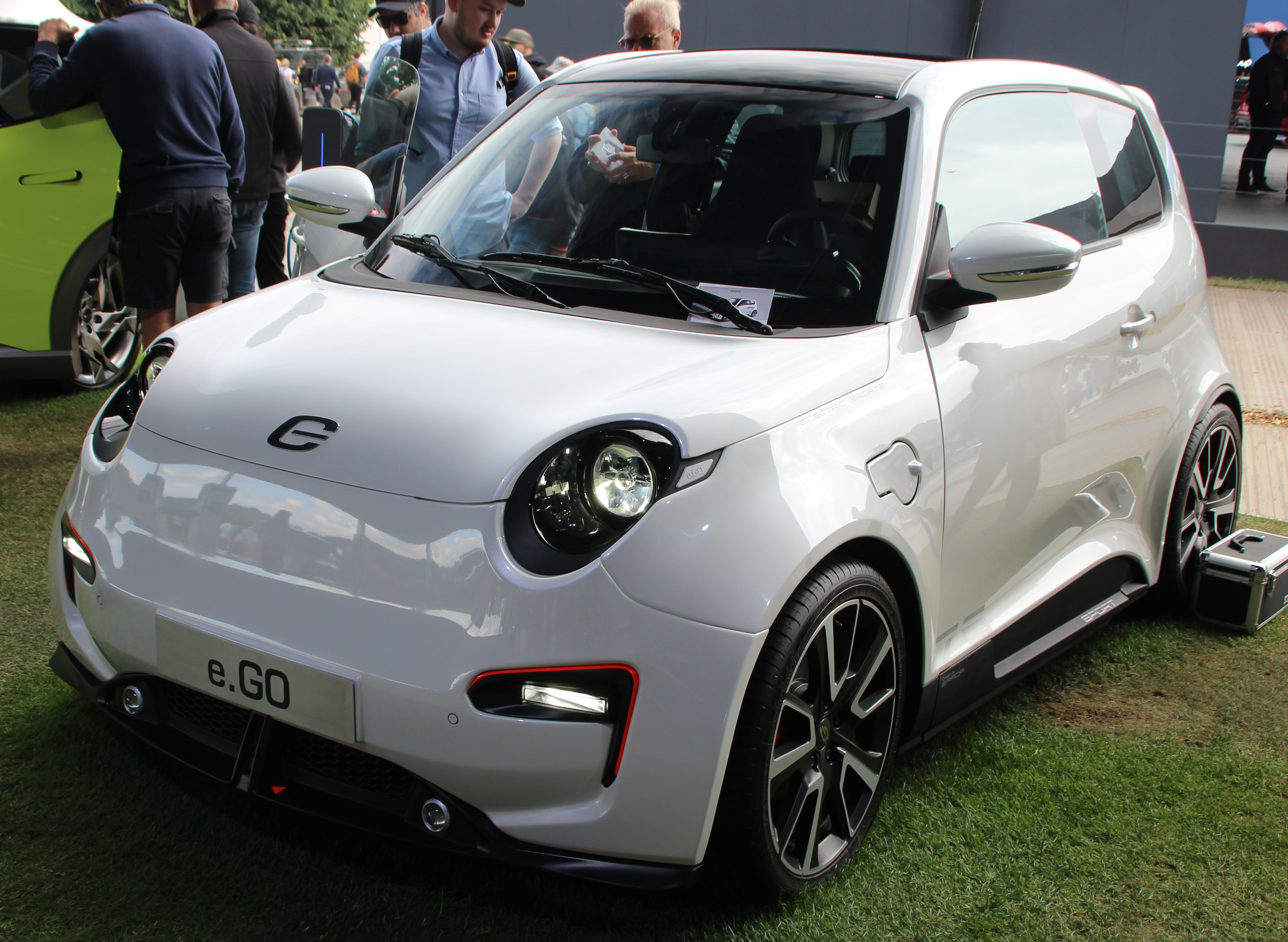
Life Sport

The e.GO Life Sport is the sports version of the e.GO Life and was presented at the 2019 Geneva Motor Show for the first time as a concept car. The derivative of the standard e.GO Life offers a more dynamic design, sportier chassis and higher performance in combination with a high-quality interior and a panorama glass roof. The near-series version of the e.GO Life Sport was planned to be revealed during the 2020 Geneva Motor Show but the motorshow was cancelled due to the COVID-19 pandemic. The replacement press release listed an 80 kW powertrain, a battery size of 30 kWh, 17-inch aluminium rims and sports seats as the specifications for the e.GO Life Sport. The final price and production date were not yet released.

==== e.GO Life Cross ====
Simultaneously to the presentation of the e.GO Life Sport in 2020, the e.GO Life Cross was revealed as the next concept car of e.GO. The e.GO Life Concept Cross is referred to as a CUV – a City Utility Vehicle. The standard e.GO Life serves as a basis but is extended by larger tyres, changes to the chassis and some add-on parts. The concept car is 1.66 metres high, 1.82 metres wide and 3.41 metres long – around seven centimetres more than the standard model. The Life Concept Cross's powertrain will have an output of 72 kW and a larger battery size. The final price and production date were not yet released.

=== e.wave X ===
Launched in May 2022 as a successor to the e.Go Life, sales commenced at the end of the year. The battery is designed to be exchangeable and has a capacity of 30.4 kWh. Despite widespread coverage of the launch of the e.Wave, production never started and the company folded in 2024.

=== e.GO Mover / Lux ===
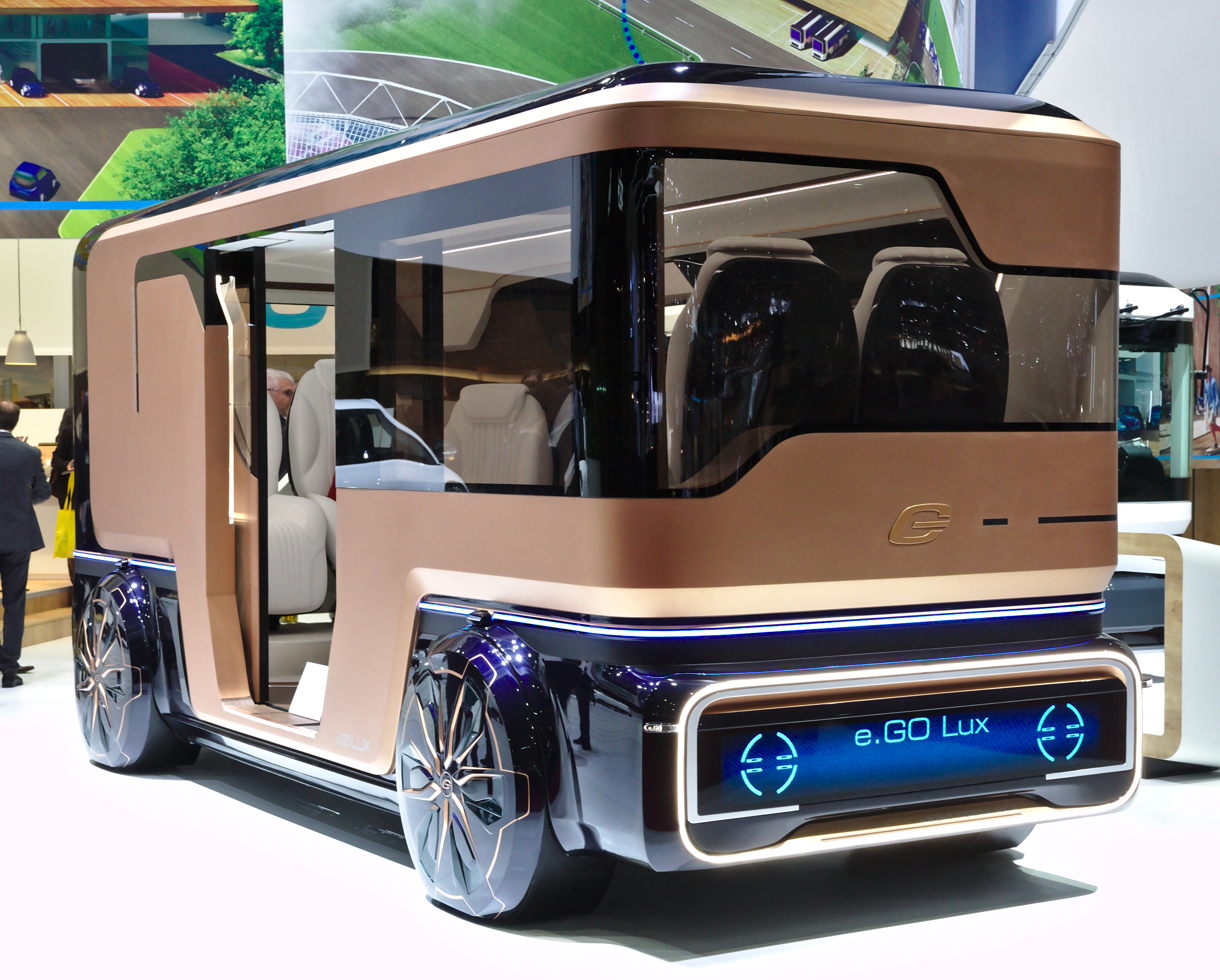
Lux

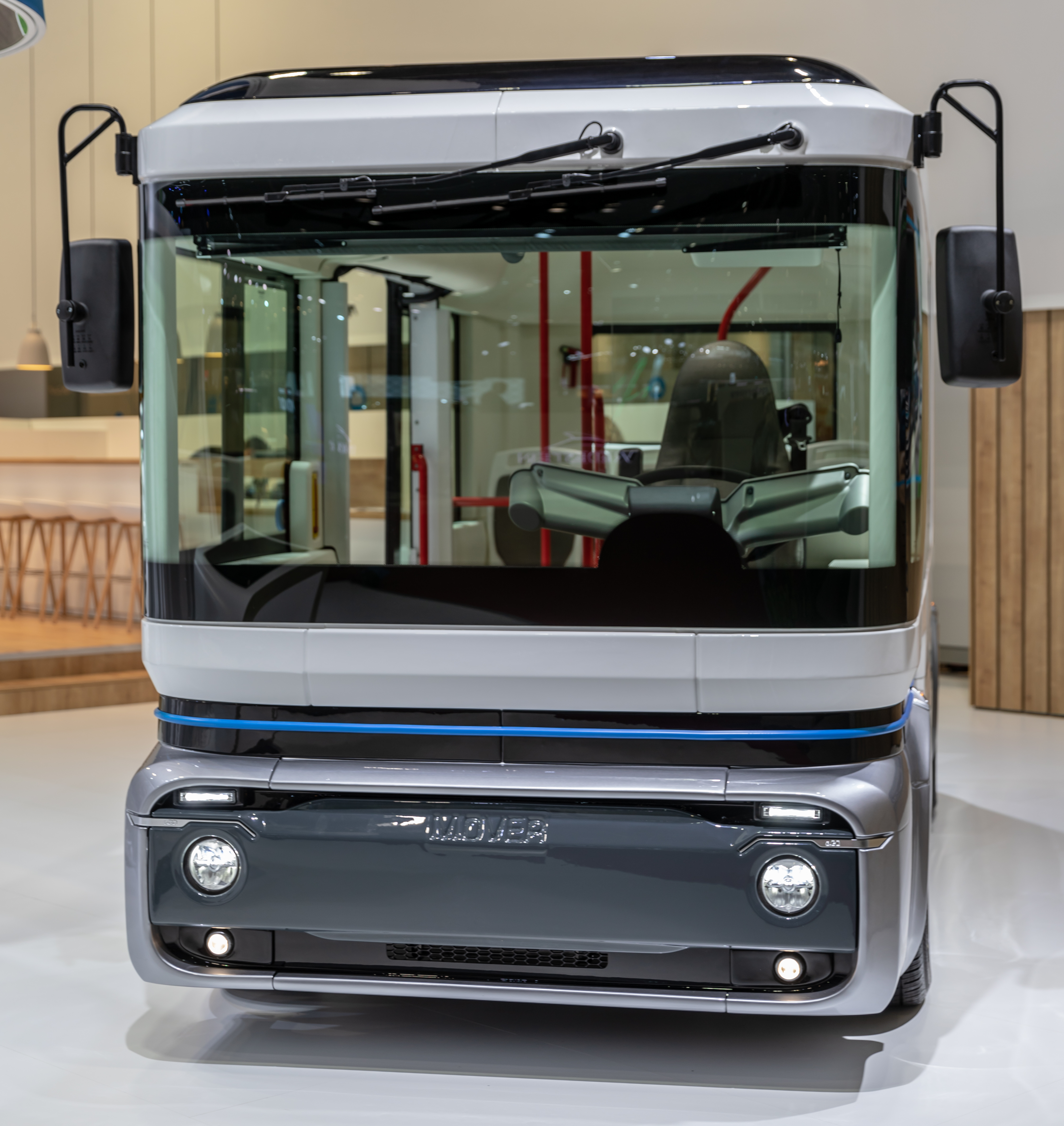
Mover

The electric city bus for up to 15 passengers was developed as a Joint Venture of e.GO MOOVE GmbH, a former subsidiary of Next.e.GO Mobile SE, and ZF Friedrichshafen. The e.GO Mover is able to operate the automated driving levels 0 to 4 and will be produced in Aachen starting 2021. The luxury version of the e.GO Mover is the e.GO LUX which was revealed at the 2019 Geneva Motor Show. The shares of ZF at e.GO MOOVE GmbH were transferred to Miltenyi Biotec B.V. & Co. KG from Bergisch Gladbach at the end of 2020. and subsequently the JV became bankrupt in 2022.
