= Waggonfabrik Talbot =

Rolling stock manufacturer

Coordinates: 50°47′09″N 6°06′39″E

- Industry: Railway rolling stock manufacturing
- Founded: 1838
- Successor: Bombardier Transportation
- Headquarters: Aachen, Germany
- Products: Wagons, coaches later Multiple units, trams, double deck rail vehicles
- Number of employees: 500 (January 2011)
- Website: talbot-services.com

Waggonfabrik Talbot was a rolling stock manufacturer founded in Aachen, Germany, in 1838. The company was an early pioneer of self discharging freight wagons, and in the latter part of the twentieth century a major supplier to the Dutch State Railways (Nederlandse Spoorwegen).

In the 1990s the company developed the Talent passenger train, and was acquired by Bombardier Transportation. In 2011 the company became part of Bombardier GmbH., and manufactured passenger rolling stock. Following the purchase, it was also referred to as Bombardier Talbot.

Bombardier announced the closure of the factory in 2012. The factory was acquired by management and local investors and operates as the independent company Talbot Services, providing rail vehicle maintenance and overhaul services since 2013. It has also branched out into other activities, such as the assembly of the StreetScooter.

== History ==
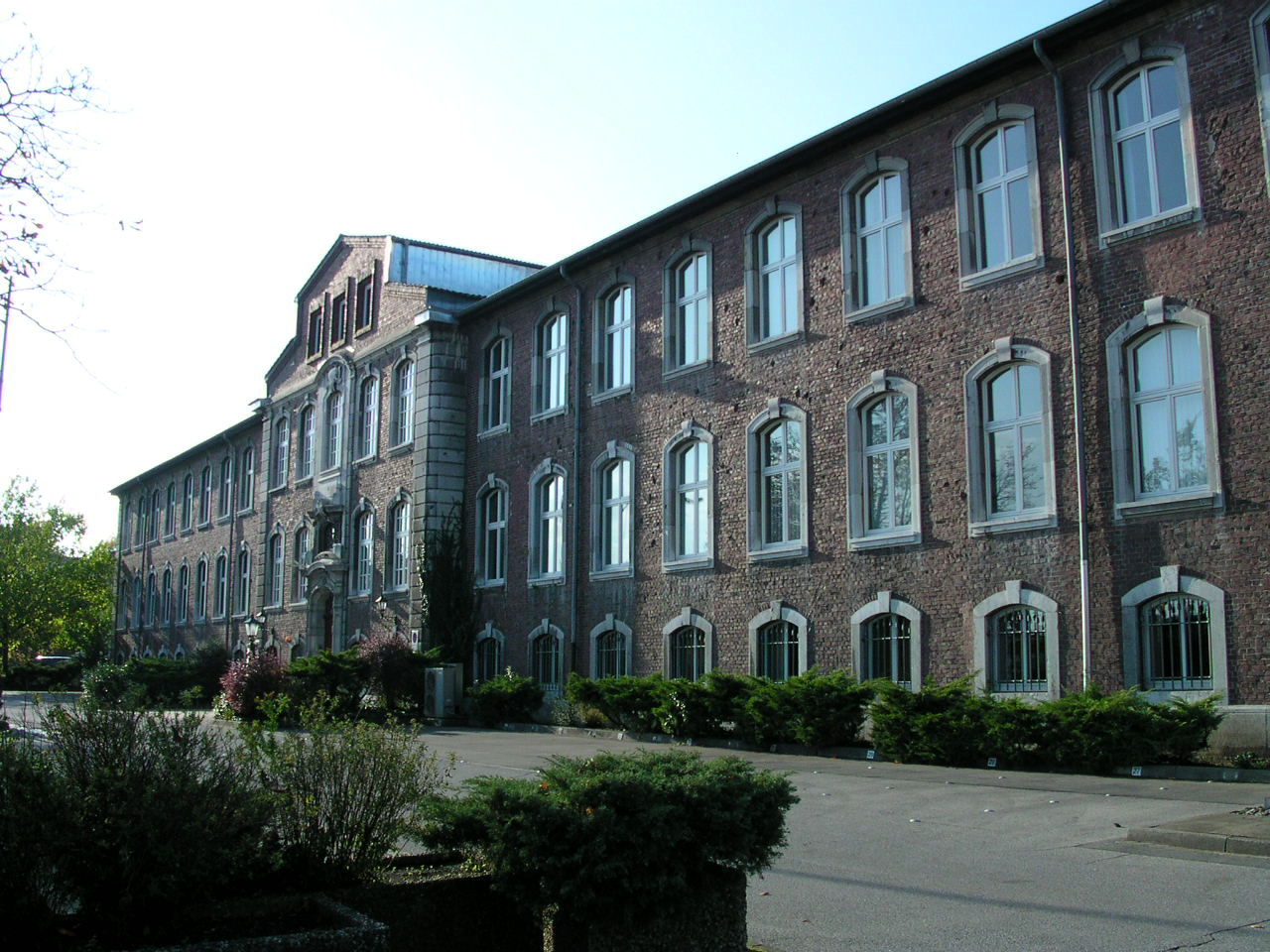
Talbot building on Jülicher Straße

In 1838, Pierre Pauwels and Hugo Talbot founded the Eisenbahn-Waggon-Fabrik Pauwels & Talbot Aachen (Pauwels & Talbot railway wagon factory) near the Adalbert gate (Adalbertsot) on Adalbertsteinweg. The company was founded to supply wagons to the Rheinische Eisenbahn-Gesellschaft (Rhenish Railway Company), and was one of the earliest wagon factories in Germany.

Belgian and English industrial knowledge played a role in the early wagonworks, in particular English wagon technology, and Belgian engineers acting as technology transferists; Pauwels, a Belgian stagecoach and wagon maker, had the experience to oversee a wagon-making business, having already delivered wagons from his Brussels wagonworks to the Leipzig-Dresdner Eisenbahn-Compagnie (Leipzig-Dresden Railway Company), whilst Talbot had the necessary Prussian citizenship to be eligible for the Rhenish Railway contract. New production facilities were opened in the Nordbahnhof area in 1845.

After the initial contract, the company sought orders but was hampered by a dependence on external suppliers, and by disruption due to the revolutions of 1848 in the German states, as well as the distance to the markets; because of transportation difficulties, a factory was built in Heidelberg in 1842.

Several early German railways were supplied with wagons from Aachen, including the Leipzig-Dresdner Eisenbahn-Compagnie (Leipzig–Dresden Railway Company), the München-Augsburger Eisenbahn-Gesellschaft (Munich-Augsburg Railway Company), Köln-Mindener Eisenbahn-Gesellschaft (Cologne-Minden Railway Company), Düsseldorf-Elberfelder Eisenbahn-Gesellschaft (Düsseldorf-Elberfeld Railway Company), Main-Neckar-Bahn (Main-Neckar Railway), Bergisch-Märkische Eisenbahn-Gesellschaft (Bergisch-Märkische Railway Company) and Großherzoglich Badische Staatseisenbahnen (Grand Duchy of Baden State Railway); most of the early lines in Southern Germany got wagons from the plant.

After Hugo Talbot's death in 1850, his sons with Peter Herbrand ran the company; after 1855 it was named as Talbot & Herbrand. A new factory was built on Jülicher Straße in 1860.

In 1891, George Talbot developed a new type of wagon - the Self-discharging wagon, which became a major source of sales. A modern plant along North American lines was added in ''Jülicher Straße in the 1890s, with modern equipment including air hammers, rivetting machines, and electric power for machines. By 1900, the plant employed up to 400 workers.

The factory site expanded in the early 1900s; by 1929, the factory employed 1700, and had a full order book, including a large order for express coaches for the Paris–Versailles line. After the interruption of the 1930s Great Depression, a new factory hall was completed, the Tannhäuserhalle. During World War II, the factory was heavily damaged, being hit by over 3000 incendiary bombs. The company recovered during the 1950s, and by 1957, accounted for half of German exports of rolling stock.

After 1968, the company became the major supplier of rolling stock to the Dutch Railways, Nederlandse Spoorwegen (NS). (Note: The Dutch company Werkspoor, once a major supplier for the Dutch railways, stopped railway vehicle production in 1972.)

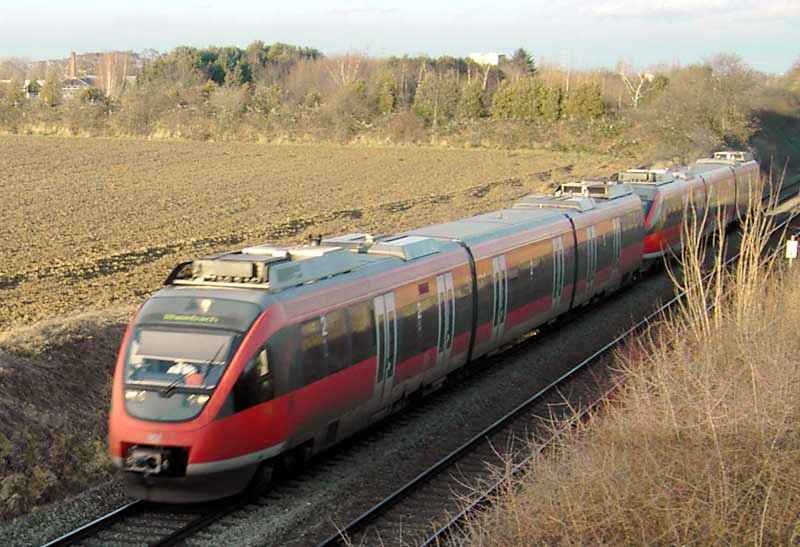
The Talent, a multiple unit passenger train in use in various European countries, was developed by Waggonfabrik Talbot.

In 1994, the Talent multiple unit was developed, and in 1995, the factory was acquired by Bombardier. The Talent subsequently entered service on the rail system of Germany, Austria and Norway.

In late 2012, Bombardier announced the closure of the plant. The plant's remaining contracts were expected to be completed by mid-2013 - lack of orders from the Netherlands contributing to the closure.

In July 2013, the plant began operating as Talbot Services GmbH.. An initial order for the factory was the manufacture of StreetScooter electric road vehicles.

== Talbot Services ==
In October 2012, Bombardier announced that it would close the plant in June 2013. Around 600 employees were affected. The employees who resisted the closure chose a legendary Aachen figure, the defensive blacksmith, as their identification figure.

The new Talbot Services GmbH took over the location and enabled the continued employment of around 240 employees. At times, in addition to rail vehicles the company also manufactured the Work electric vehicle for StreetScooter GmbH. In 2020, Talbot Services received a contract to convert and maintain wagons for Flixtrain trains.

In August 2022, the newly-founded Talbot Holding GmbH took over 100% of the shares of Talbot Services GmbH. Talbot Services employs 465 people (as of June 2023).
