= StreetScooter =

Luton manufacture

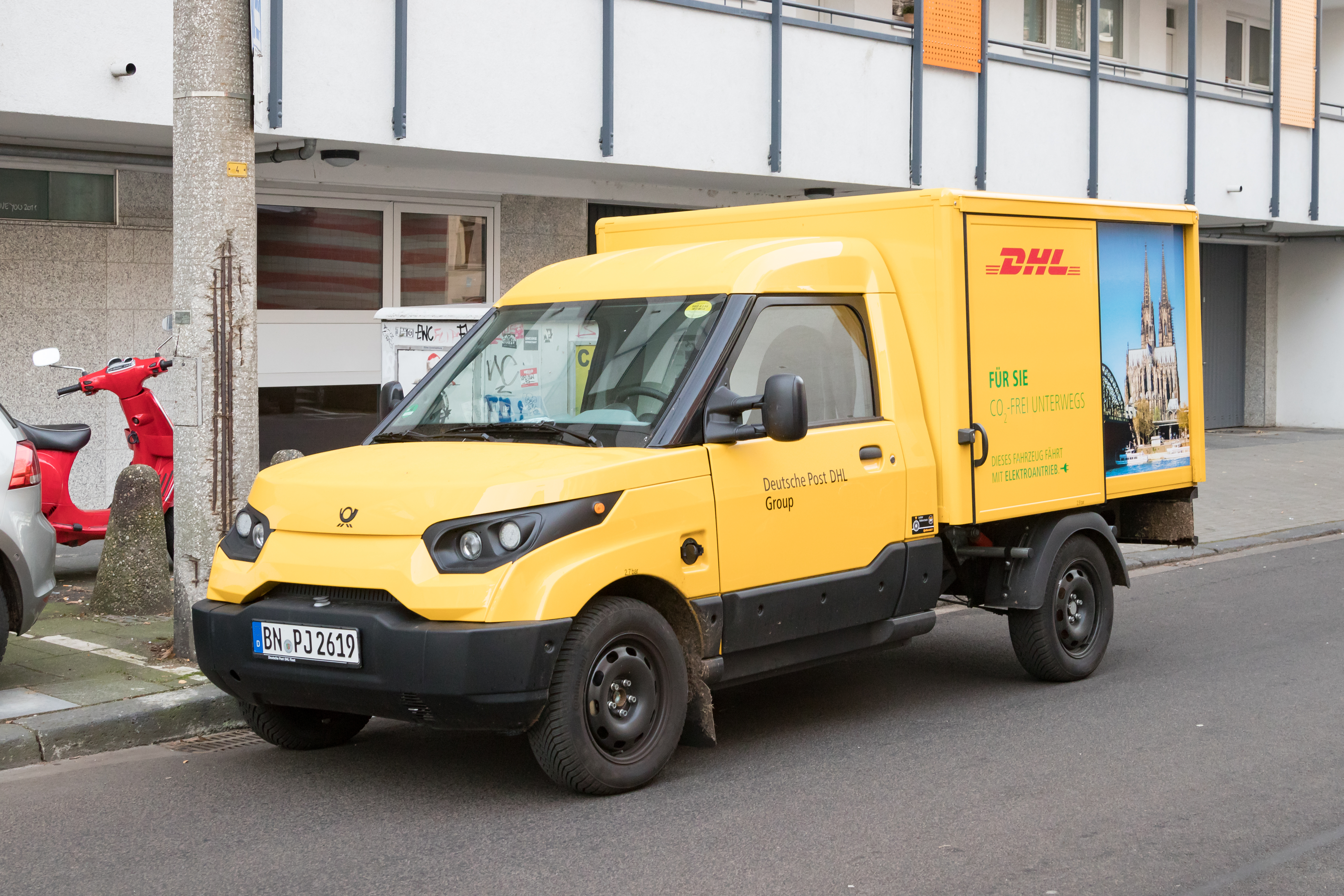
StreetScooter Work as DHL delivery van (2016)

B-ON GmbH (formerly Streetscooter GmbH until 2022) is an electric vehicle manufacturer located in Aachen, Germany. The company has been owned by DHL Group since 2014.

The company has delivered over 17,000 all-electric vans and trucks in Germany alone, with a stated goal of 21,500 van in operation by DHL.

== History ==
=== 2010–2014: Founding, acquisition by Deutsche Post ===
In June 2010, Achim Kampker, together with Günther Schuh, founded Street Scooter GmbH; (in August 2014, it was renamed StreetScooter GmbH). This was a privately organized research initiative at the RWTH Aachen University which later became an independent company in Aachen. Kampker was also the founder and chairman of the European Network for Affordable and Sustainable Electromobility.

One of the experimental designs by the company was the StreetScooter C16, a very small two-seater city car with all its exterior plastic parts 3D-printed, shown at EuroMold in November 2014.

In May 2014, the company announced that the city of Aachen, the Aachen city council and the Aachen savings bank had ordered electric vehicles from the company.

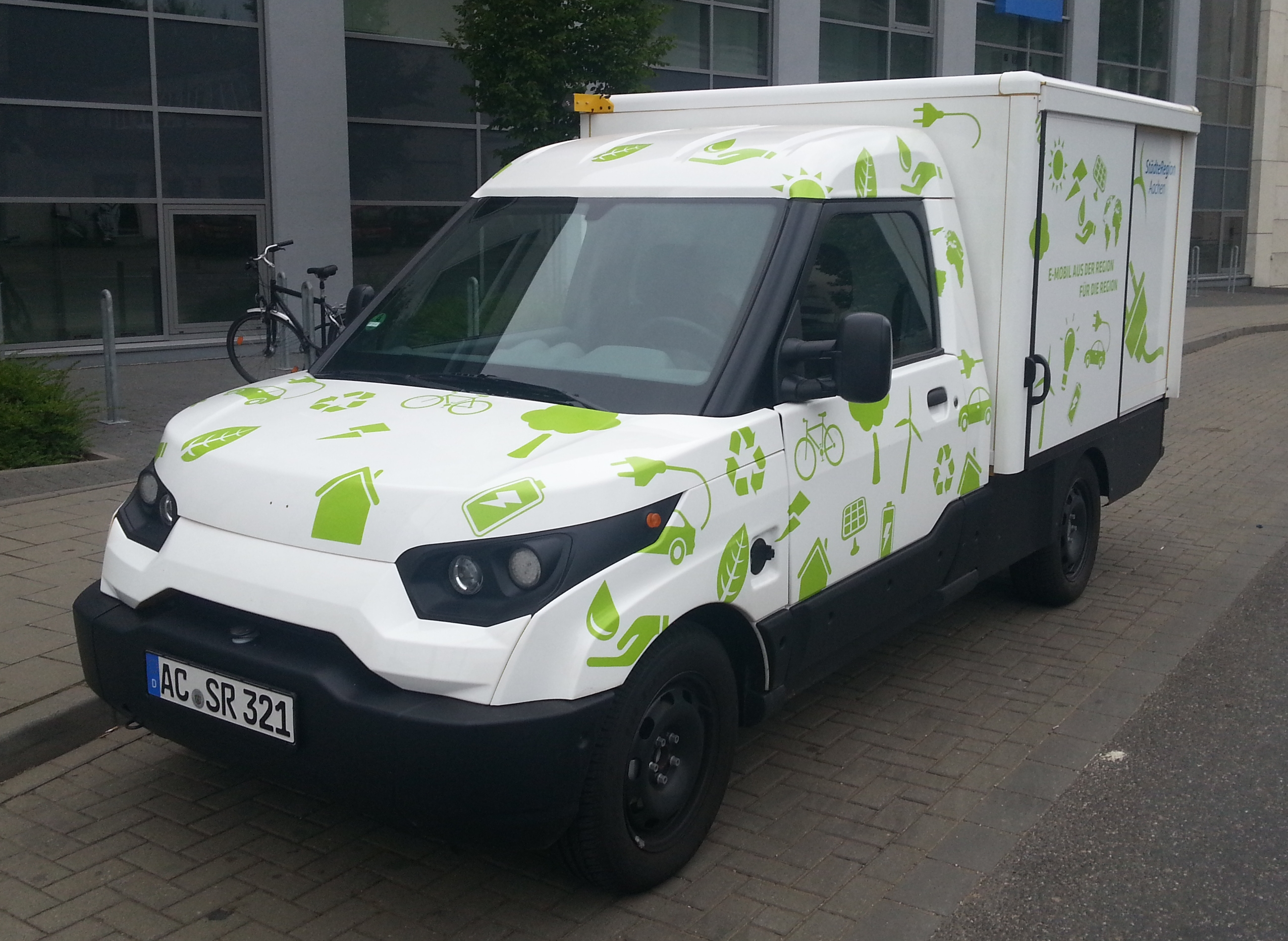
StreetScooter box van used by the Aachen district council (2015 photo)

In December 2014, approximately 70 employees were manufacturing 200 vehicles annually in the premises of the Waggonfabrik Talbot, the former Talbot/Bombardier plant in Aachen. At that time, Deutsche Post DHL Group purchased the StreetScooter company, which became its wholly owned subsidiary.

The company made an announcement in April 2016 of its intention to begin larger scale production of the StreetScooter Work model with 2,000 to be produced by the end of that year. In future, electric vans with a much greater range will be required to achieve the goal of replacing the entire Deutsche Post and DHL Express fleet of approximately 70,000 vehicles with electric StreetScooters.

=== 2015–2018: Mass production ===
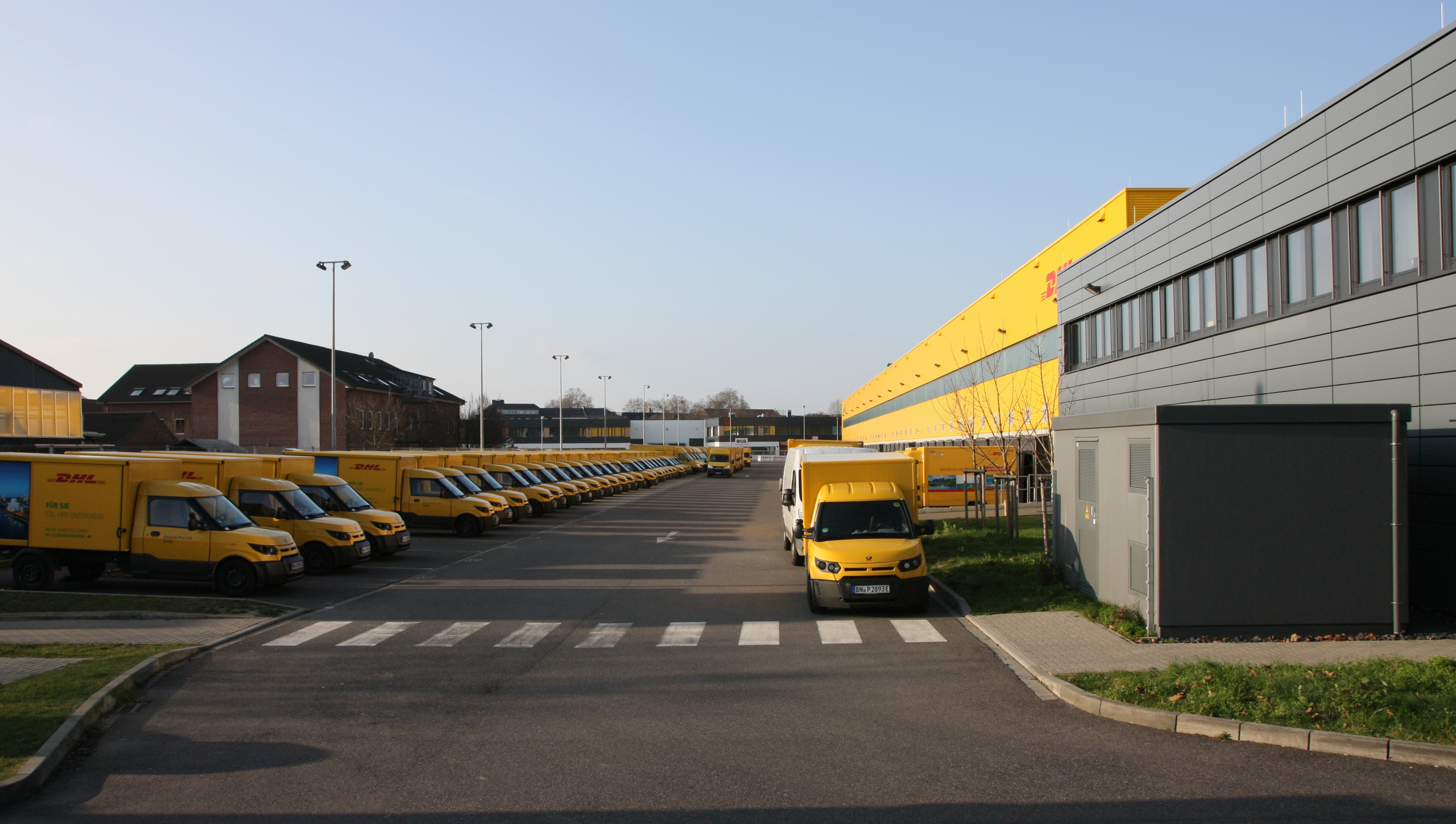
About 10,000 StreetScooters were delivered in Germany from 2015 to the end of 2018, of which about 9,000 went to Deutsche Post/DHL

Deliveries in Germany

In April 2016, Deutsche Post DHL Group announced that StreetScooter GmbH would be scaling up to manufacture approximately 10,000 of the Work vehicles annually, starting in 2017.

Deutsche Post's 2016 annual report indicates that it plans to replace its fleet of delivery vehicles in Germany with the electric StreetScooter products "in the medium term". Electric vans and trucks with a much greater range will be required to achieve the very long-term goal of replacing the Group's entire fleet of approximately 70,000 vehicles with electric StreetScooter vehicles.

Some of the Deutsche Post vans to be replaced by StreetScooters are the Volkswagen Caddy models. StreetScooter showed a larger prototype, the Work L, in September 2016. The company also announced that it was developing a Work Orange model with an "electro-hydraulic three-way dumper" for use by businesses that deal in trash or construction material handling.

In October 2017 Streetscooter announced to build a second factory in Düren with a production capability of up to 10,000 vehicles per year. Operations were expected to begin in the second quarter 2018. In 2018, Deutsche Post was awarded a contract to supply 200 electric trucks to the UK delivery service Milk & More.

=== 2019–: Potential sale, expansion to China ===
As of August 2019, due to rising competition from established car makers, Deutsche Post is exploring selling StreetScooter or partnering with other companies, in order to turn the company to profit.

In September 2019, StreetScooter announced a cooperation with Chinese carmaker Chery. It is planned to produce up to 100,000 vehicles per year by 2021.

=== 2020: uncertain future ===
In March 2020, DHL announced that StreetScooter would be closed instead of being sold, but just one month later announced that production for captive use will continue until at least the end of 2022. The reason for this is the high demand for electric vehicles within the DHL-Group: The current figure of more than 15,000 Streetscooters is expected to rise to around 21,500 by the end of 2022.

In 2021 plans for the sale of Streetscooter to Luxembourg-based Odin Automotive, now B-ON, were reported.

== Models ==
=== Work ===
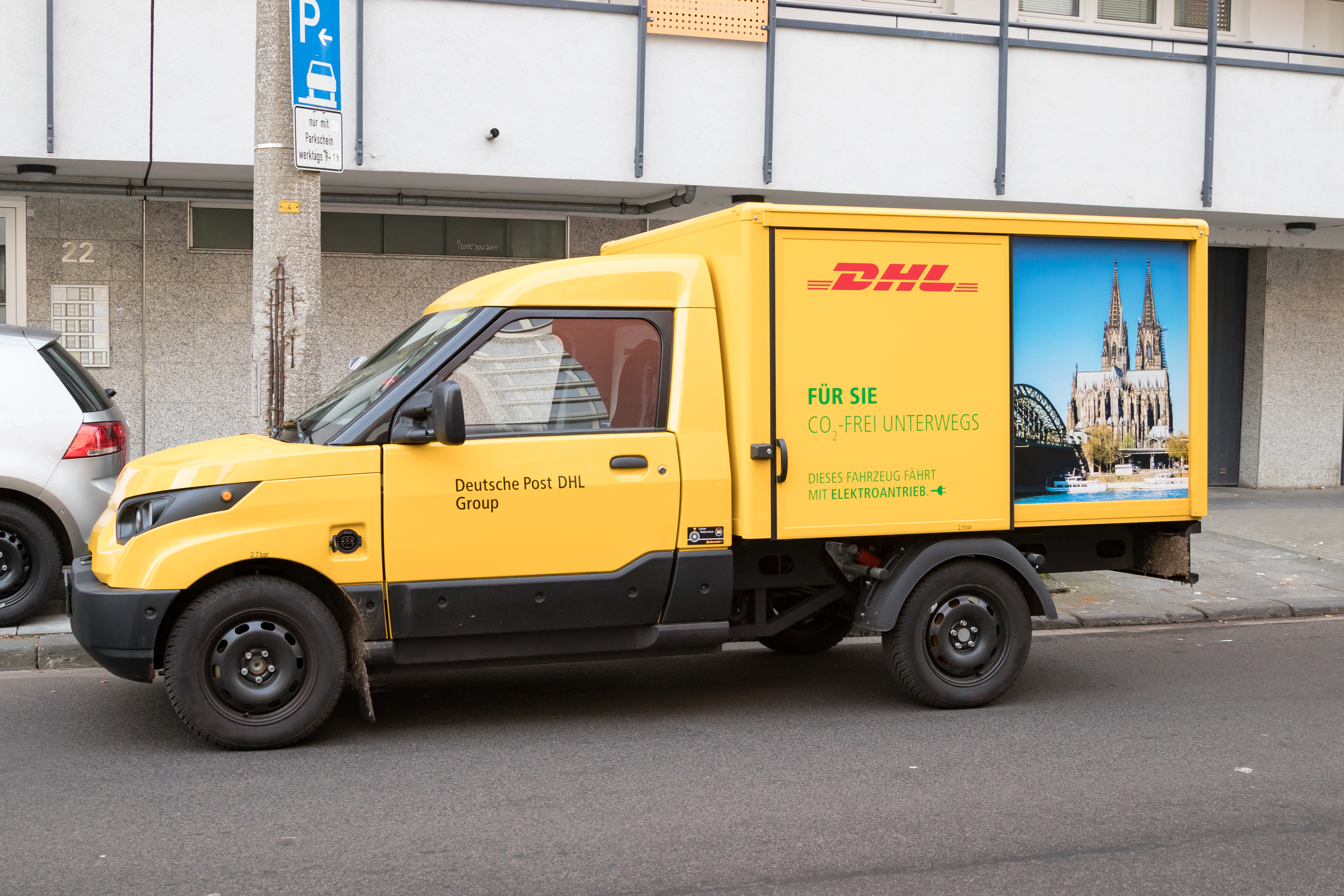
StreetScooter Work

This vehicle is equipped with lithium-ion battery packs and is powered by a permanent-magnet synchronous electric motor, giving 68 kW of peak power (58 kW of continuous power) and 205 Nm of torque. Battery capacity is 40 kWh; a smaller 20 kWh battery pack option was also offered earlier. The van's maximum speed is 120 km/h.

Range (before the need to recharge) with the larger battery pack was estimated at 159 km WLTP, but actual range depends on the weight of the load, vehicle speed and traffic conditions. Conversely, the version equipped with battery half that capacity (20 kWh) was said to have 50 to 80 km of range.

The floor of the cargo hold is 100% flat; there are no wheel wells protruding into it, as it is located entirely above them. The volume of the cargo hold is 4 cubic meters (140 cubic feet) while the load capacity is 1,234-1,266 kg (it was much lower in previous versions). The body structure is made of steel and the exterior panels are made of structural plastics. Aside from the box truck version, the vehicle is also available as a pick-up and as a chassis cab. The price for the larger-battery model is between 38,450 and 42,750 EUR (excl. VAT).

=== Work L ===
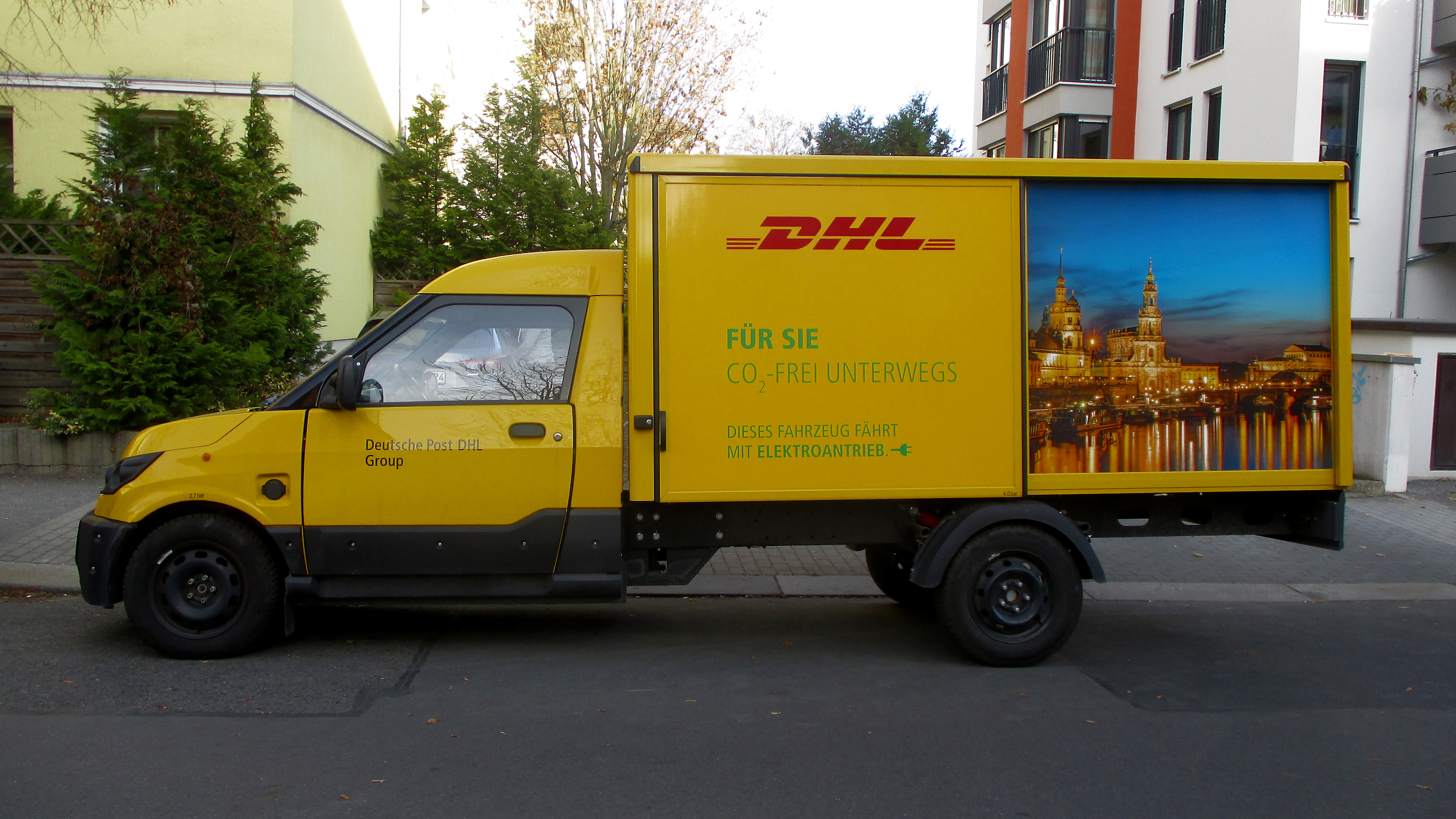
StreetScooter Work L

Shown in September 2016 at the IAA Commercial Vehicles trade fair, the Work L prototype is a longer and slightly higher vehicle with almost double the cargo volume. The current models with a 40 kWh battery reach 120 km/h and have a claimed range of 158 km (WLTP), with 7.7 cubic meters (270 cubic feet) cargo volume and a load of 1,220-1,252 kg. According to the current (2020) price list, the chassis cab model costs 43,350 EUR and the box truck model costs 47,650 EUR (excl. VAT).

=== Work XL ===
StreetScooter Work XL

Introduced in August 2017, the Work XL is based on the Ford Transit, with a cargo volume of 20 cubic meters. This model has a 76 kWh battery, reaches 90 km/h and its range is 205 km (NEDC), carrying a payload of up to 1175 kg. Currently, this largest model of the "Work" series is produced exclusively for Deutsche Post.

=== Smaller models ===
StreetScooter has received a research and development contract for pedelectric bicycles and tricycles, single-seaters or convertibles from Swiss Post. The prototype of the Work S bike can carry loads up to 60 kg, while the Work M trike has a payload of 90 kg.
