= LWS-3 Mewa =

Polish military aircraft

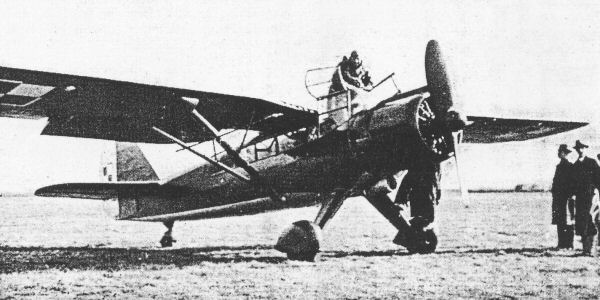
- LWS-3 Mewa prototype

General information
- Type: Reconnaissance
- Manufacturer: LWS
- Primary user: Polish Military Aviation

History
- Manufactured: 1938 – 1939
- First flight: August 1938
- Retired: 1939
- Variant: LWS-7 Mewa II

The LWS-3 Mewa ("Seagull") was a Polish observation and close reconnaissance aircraft, designed in the late-1930s by the LWS factory. It was ordered by the Polish Military Aviation, but did not manage to enter service before the outbreak of World War II.

== Design and development ==
The aircraft was designed as the successor to the obsolete Lublin R-XIII army cooperation plane. First sketches were drawn in 1936 by Zbysław Ciołkosz, the chief designer of the LWS factory (Lubelska Wytwórnia Samolotów). It was similar to the earlier light ambulance plane LWS-2, which itself was inspired by the STOL plane RWD-9 wing design. After Ciołkosz had left LWS in 1937, the project, named LWS-3 Mewa, was modified and further developed at the LWS bureau. In the same year, the Polish Air Force ordered three prototypes. The first prototype LWS-3/I was flown in November 1937. It revealed some handling deficiencies, but otherwise a good performance. Following tests, the design of the aircraft was improved. In 1938, the second prototype LWS-3/II was flown. It had a crank mechanism to lower tailfin and rudder in order to increase angle of the rear machine gun fire, but as it proved impractical, the next prototype LWS-3/III from autumn 1938 again had a classic tailfin design. The third prototype, with some further changes, among others to the engine cover and canopy, was the pattern for serial production. The first prototype was exhibited at the 16th International Paris Aviation Salon in November 1938 (as "PZL Mewa"), where it met with interest.

Official tests were satisfactory, and in 1938 the Polish Air Force ordered 200 aircraft of the production variant LWS-3A Mewa (or "Mewa A"). The production started in early 1939, and first aircraft were to be ready in the summer. In August 1939, about 30 aircraft were almost completed (10 ready, but lacking propellers, 7 in painting and 10 in final assembly).

LWS-3B Mewa variant powered with a Fiat R74 860 hp (640 kW) engine for Bulgaria was being developed as well as a floatplane LWS-3H (hydro) variant for the Polish naval aviation. None were produced due to the war outbreak.

=== LWS-7 Mewa II ===
In 1939, the LWS-7 Mewa II was being developed at the LWS as the development of Mewa. Before the war, only a model for aerodynamics tests was made. Drawings of LWS-7 were evacuated in September 1939 to the Polish embassy in Romania by the LWS director Aleksander Sipowicz. Many publications claim that they were handed over to Bulgarians, but it is not clear (possibly, it concerned the LWS-3B plans, in fact). The Bulgarian-built reconnaissance plane KB-11 Fazan bore some resemblance to Mewa.

== Operational history ==
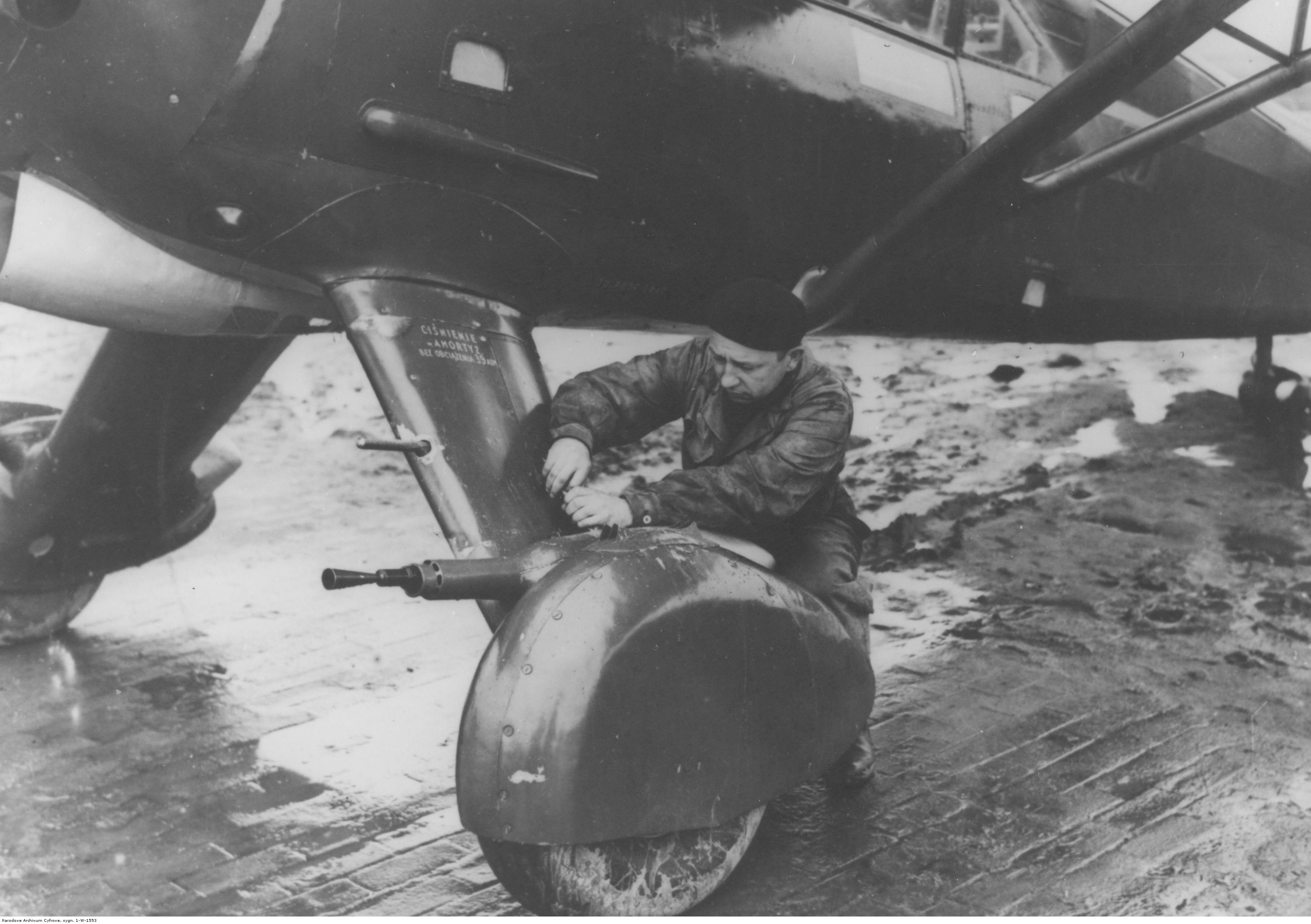
Wz. 36 machine gun in the LWS-3 undergoing maintenance

None of the aircraft entered service in the Polish Air Force before the outbreak of the World War II on September 1, 1939. The problem was with propellers, which had to be delivered from France. The first two aircraft were ready for delivery on September 2, but one of them was damaged on the factory airfield in Lublin by German bombers. The fate of the other one is not clear.

Following that, some of the almost finished aircraft were hidden in Lublin park and in a forest nearby. A couple were modified to use wooden propellers with a fixed pitch. Two such aircraft were evacuated to an airfield near Lwów, and given over to the 26th Observation Escadre on September 12. One of them crashed during a night landing on Medyka airfield near Przemyśl on the same day, the other was burned on September 17, when it could not be evacuated. According to some sources, two other Mewas were assigned to the 23rd Observation Escadre on September 11, but this has not been confirmed. It is not clear whether any of these aircraft were armed. One of the aircraft was also seen during evacuation to Pinsk in mid-September. The rest of uncompleted aircraft were seized by Germans and scrapped.

Contrary to its direct predecessor, RWD-14 Czapla, the Mewa was a modern close reconnaissance plane, comparable with leading foreign aircraft of that period, like Henschel Hs 126 or Westland Lysander. Its advantages were quite short take-off and landing, which enabled it to operate from short or unprepared remote fields.

== Technical description ==
Mixed construction (steel and wood) monoplane, conventional in layout, with braced high wings, canvas and plywood covered. Wings folded rearwards. Conventional fixed landing gear, with a tailwheel. Crew of two, sitting in tandem in a closed cockpit, with large transparent canopy surfaces. The crew had dual controls. Prototypes were armed with two forward-firing 7.92 mm machine guns fixed on the undercarriage covers, but it appeared, that their accuracy was low due to vibration, and (according to J. Cynk) production aircraft were intended to have twin machine guns on fuselage sides. The observer had a 7.92 mm wz.37 machine gun in a rear station, covered by opening canopy. 14-cylinder air-cooled radial engine Gnome-Rhône 14M01 (prototypes) or 14M05 (serial) with 660 hp (490 kW) nominal power and 730 hp (540 kW) maximum power. Three-blade metal propeller (planned) or two-blade wooden propeller (installed on some aircraft). Fuel capacity about 380 L in wings. The aircraft was fitted with radio and cameras.

== Variants ==
LWS-3/I
The first prototype.

LWS-3/II
The second prototype, equipped with a crank mechanism to lower tailfin and rudder in order to increase angle of the rear machine gun fire.

LWS-3/III
The third prototype with a classic tailfin design and some further changes, among others to the engine cover and canopy. Pattern for serial production.

LWS-3A Mewa (Mewa A)
Basic production variant, 200 ordered for Polish Air Force, only 30 completed or almost completed.

LWS-3B Mewa (Mewa B)
Planned variant for Bulgaria powered with a Fiat A.74 860 hp (640 kW) engine.

LWS-3H (hydro)
Planned floatplane variant for the Polish naval aviation.

LWS-7 Mewa II
Planned development of Mewa with new wings, a semi-monocoque fuselage and stronger 916 hp (683 kW) engine PZL Pegaz XX (Bristol Pegasus XX) or a planned 1000 hp (750 kW) PZL Waran.

== Operators ==
Wartime
Poland

- Polish Military Aviation

Planned
Bulgaria

- Bulgarian Air Force ordered 60 aircraft of the LWS-3B variant in April 1939. None were produced due to the war outbreak.

== Specifications (LWS-3A) ==
Data from Polish aircraft 1893-1939

General characteristics

- Crew: 2 (pilot and observer)
- Length: 9.5 m (31 ft 2 in)
- Wingspan: 13.45 m (44 ft 2 in)
- Height: 2.65 m (8 ft 8 in)
- Wing area: 27 m^{2} (290 sq ft)
- Airfoil: IAW-192 (PZL-DJ3)
- Empty weight: 1,748 kg (3,854 lb)
- Gross weight: 2,420 kg (5,335 lb)
- Powerplant: 1 × Gnome-Rhône 14M-05 14-cylinder air-cooled radial piston engine, 540 kW (730 hp) at 3,500 m (11,500 ft) at 3,135 rpm

660 hp (490 kW) at 3,650 m (11,980 ft) at 2,850 rpm

- Propellers: 2-bladed adjustable-pitch wooden propeller

Performance

- Maximum speed: 360 km/h (220 mph, 190 kn) at 3,600 m (11,800 ft)

300 km/h (190 mph; 160 kn) at sea level

- Cruise speed: 310 km/h (190 mph, 170 kn) at 3,600 m (11,800 ft)
- Range: 700 km (430 mi, 380 nmi)
- Service ceiling: 8,500 m (27,900 ft)
- Rate of climb: 10 m/s (2,000 ft/min)
- Time to altitude: 1,000 m (3,300 ft) in 1 minute 40 seconds

3,600 m (11,800 ft) in 5 minutes 30 seconds

- Wing loading: 89.6 kg/m^{2} (18.4 lb/sq ft)
- Power/mass: 0.225 kW/kg (0.137 hp/lb)

Armament

- Guns: 3 machine guns

- 2× fixed, forward-firing 7.92 mm PWU karabin lotniczy uniwersalny wz. 36,
- 1× movable, rearward-firing 7.92 mm PWU karabin lotniczy obserwatora wz. 37

== See also ==
Related development

- LWS-2
- LWS-7 Mewa II

Aircraft of comparable role, configuration, and era

- Henschel Hs 126
- IAR 39
- Kaproni Bulgarski KB-11 Fazan
- Levente II
- Weiss WM-21 Solyom
- Westland Lysander
