= List of attack aircraft =

List of military ground attack aircraft

The ground attack aircraft listed here are military aircraft used to attack targets on the ground with greater speed and a smaller radar cross section than strategic bombers. Historically, attack aircraft were used for their higher precision compared to strategic bombers when delivering unguided munitions. Modern attack aircraft may be expected to function in high threat environments where enemy air defences preclude the use of strategic bombers. There are bound to be some overlap in the role and design between categories and some multirole combat aircraft appear in more than one list. Fighters, fighter-bombers, and even trainers have also often been used in the role of attack aircraft. Trainer aircraft have particularly been re-perpoused as attack aircraft when they were obsolete in their original role, or as a cheaper alternative where air defences are minimal.

The use of the term attack aircraft is primarily an American term, as other countries have described identical aircraft variously as light bombers, fighter-bomber, army cooperation aircraft and close support aircraft. In the US Air Force the naming convention for ground attack aircraft is a prefix "A-", followed by a number, e.g. A-10, bomber aircraft are prefixed with “B-”, e.g. B-52, and fighter aircraft with “F-”, e.g. F-35.

This list is limited to fixed-wing aircraft that have been built, and does not include abandoned concepts or fictional aircraft. Dates after each entry are of first flight.

Type	Country	Class	Date	Status	No.	Notes
AEG DJ.I	German Empire		1918	Prototype	1+	
AEG J.I	German Empire		1917	Retired	609	
Aermacchi MB-326	Italy		1957	Operational	650	
Aermacchi MB-339	Italy		1976	Operational	213+	
Aermacchi M-345	Italy		2016	Operational	4	
Aermacchi SF.260	Italy		1964	Operational	860+	
Aero A.100	Czechoslovakia		1933	Retired	44	
Aero A.101	Czechoslovakia		1934	Retired	50+	
Aero L-29 Delfín	Czechoslovakia		1959	Operational	3,500	
Aero L-39 Albatros	Czechoslovakia		1968	Operational	592	
Aero L-59 Super Albatros	Czechoslovakia		1986	Operational	71	
Aero L-159 Alca	Czech Republic		1997	Operational	72	
Aero L-39CW	Czech Republic		2015	Prototype	1	
Aero L-39 Skyfox	Czech Republic		2018	Operational	10	
Aichi D1A	Empire of Japan		1934	Retired	590	
Aichi D3A	Empire of Japan		1938	Retired	1,486	
AIDC AT-3	Taiwan		1980	Operational	63	
Albatros J.I	German Empire		1917		240	
Albatros J.II	German Empire		1918?		4	
AMX International AMX	Italy & Brazil		1984		230	
Arado Ar 66	Germany		1932		1,456	
Armstrong Whitworth F.K.8	UK		1916		1,650	
BAE Harrier II	UK		1985		143	
BAE Hawk 200	UK		1986		62	
BAE Systems Hawk	UK		1974		1,000	
Bell P-39 Airacobra	US		1938		9,584	
Blackburn Buccaneer	UK		1958		211	
Blackburn Firebrand	UK		1942		223	
Blackburn Firecrest	UK		1947		3	
Blackburn Ripon	UK		1926		121	
Blackburn Shark	UK		1933		269	
Blackburn Skua	UK		1937		192	
Boeing F/A-18E/F Super Hornet	US		1995		500	
Boeing GA-1	US		1920		10	
Breda Ba.64	Kingdom of Italy		1934		42	
Breda Ba.65	Kingdom of Italy		1935		218	
Breda Ba.88	Kingdom of Italy		1936		149	
Breguet 19	France		1922		2,700 c.	
Breguet 693	France		1938		230 c.	
Breguet Vultur	France		1951		2	
Bristol Beaufighter	UK		1939		5,928	
Bristol Beaufort	UK		1938		2,129	
Bristol Blenheim	UK		1935		4,422	
Bristol F.2 Fighter	UK		1916		5,329	
CAC Wirraway	Australia		1937		755	
CAC Woomera	Australia		1941		2	
CAC/PAC JF-17 Thunder	China/Pakistan		2003	Operational	100+	
Canadair CL-41G Tebuan	Canada		1966		20	
Caproni A.P.1	Kingdom of Italy		1934		57	
Casa C-101	Spain		1977		166	
Cessna A-37 Dragonfly	US		1963		577	
Chengdu J-10	China		1998	Operational	270	
Chengdu J-20	China		2011	Operational	28	
Curtiss A-12 Shrike	US		1933		46	
Curtiss A-18 Shrike	US		1937		13	
Curtiss A-8	US		1931		13	
Curtiss Falcon	US		1924		488	
Curtiss SBC Helldiver	US		1935		257	
Curtiss XA-14	US		1935		1	
Curtiss SB2C Helldiver	US		1942		7,140	
DAR 10	Bulgaria		1941		2	
Dassault Étendard IV	France		1958		90	
Dassault Mirage 2000	France		1978		601	
Dassault Mirage F1	France		1966		720+	
Dassault Mystère IV	France		1952		411	
Dassault Ouragan	France		1949		362	
Dassault Rafale	France		1986		141	
Dassault Super Mystère	France		1955		180	
Dassault-Breguet Super Étendard	France		1974		85	
Dassault/Dornier Alpha Jet	France & Germany		1973		480	
de Havilland Mosquito	UK		1940		7,781	
de Havilland Venom	UK		1949		1,431	
Douglas A-1 Skyraider	US		1945		3,180	
Douglas A-20 Havoc	US		1939		7,478	
Douglas A-26 Invader	US		1942		2,452	
Douglas A-3 Skywarrior	US		1952		282	
Douglas A-4 Skyhawk	US		1954		2,960	
Douglas AC-47 Spooky	US		1965		53	
Douglas SBD Dauntless	US		1940		5,936	
Douglas XA-2	US		1926		1	
EKW C-36	Switzerland		1939		175	
Embraer EMB 312 Tucano	Brazil		1980		664	
Embraer EMB 314 Super Tucano	Brazil		1999	Operational	200+	
English Electric Canberra	UK		1949		949	
Eurofighter Typhoon	UK, Germany, Italy & Spain		1994	Operational	589	
Fairchild A-10 Thunderbolt II	US		1972	Operational	716	
Fairchild AC-119	US		1968		52	
Fairey Albacore	UK		1938		800	
Fairey Battle	UK		1936		2,185	
Fairey Fawn	UK		1923		75	
Fairey Gordon	UK		1931		186	
Fairey Swordfish	UK		1934		2,391	
Fiat G.91	Italy		1956		770	
Fieseler Fi 167	Nazi Germany		1938		14	
FMA IA 58 Pucará	Argentina		1969		150–160	
FMA IA 63 Pampa	Argentina		1984		27	
Fokker C.V	Netherlands		1924		955	
Fokker C.X	Netherlands		1934		71	
Fokker XA-7	US		1931		1	
General Dynamics F-111 Aardvark	US		1964		563	
General Dynamics F-16 Fighting Falcon	US		1974	Operational	4,540+	
Great Lakes BG	US		1933		61	
Grumman A-6 Intruder	US		1960		693	
Grumman F7F Tigercat	US		1943		364	
Grumman F9F Panther	US		1947		1,382	
Grumman OV-1 Mohawk	US		1959		380	
Grumman TBF Avenger	US		1941		9,839	
Grumman Future Air Attack Vehicle	US		1993		0	
HAL HF-24 Marut	India		1961		147	
HAL Tejas	India		2001	Operational	32	
Halberstadt CL.II	German Empire		1917		900	
Halberstadt CL.IV	German Empire		1918?		900	
Hannover CL.III	German Empire		1917		617	
Hawker Audax	UK		1931		700+	
Hawker Hardy	UK		1934		48	
Hawker Hart	UK		1928		1,004	
Hawker Hector	UK		1936		179	
Hawker Hunter	UK		1951		1,972	
Hawker Hurricane	UK		1935		14,583	
Hawker Siddeley HS 138	UK		1967	Prototype	0	
Hawker Siddeley Harrier	UK		1969		278	
Hawker Typhoon	UK		1940		3,317	
Heinkel He 45	Germany		1931		512	
Heinkel He 46	Germany		1931		500 c.	
Heinkel He 50	Germany		1931		78	
Heinkel 51C	Nazi Germany		1933		100	
Helio Stallion	US		1964		20	
Henschel Hs 123	Nazi Germany		1935		250 c.	
Henschel Hs 129	Nazi Germany		1939		865	
HESA Azarakhsh	Iran		1997	Operational	6-9	
Hongdu JL-8	China		1990		500	
IAR 37, 38 and 39	Romania		1937		380	
IAR 80 & 81	Romania		1939		346	
IAR-93 Vultur	Romania		1974		88	
IAR-99 Soim	Romania		1985		20	
Ilyushin Il-10 & Avia B-33	USSR		1944		6,166	
Ilyushin Il-2 Sturmovik	USSR		1939		36,183	
IMAM Ro.57bis	Kingdom of Italy		1942		50-75	
IML Addax	New Zealand		1982		0	
Junkers CL.I	German Empire		1917		51	
Junkers Ju 87	Nazi Germany		1935		6,500 c.	
KAI TA-50 Golden Eagle	South Korea		2002	Operational	200	
Kawasaki Army Type 88 Reconnaissance Aircraft	Empire of Japan		1927		1,117	
Kawasaki Ki-102	Empire of Japan		1944		238	
Kawasaki Ki-3	Empire of Japan		1933		243	
Kawasaki Ki-32	Empire of Japan		1937		854	
Latécoère 298	France		1936		121	
Letov Š-328	Czechoslovakia		1933		412	
LIPNUR Sikumbang	Indonesia		1954	Retired	2	
Lockheed AC-130	US		1966		47	
Lockheed F-117 Nighthawk	US		1981		64	
Lockheed Hudson	US		1938		2,941	
Lockheed Martin F-35 Lightning II	US		2006	Operational	960+	
Lockheed P-38 Lightning	US		1939		10,037	
Loire-Nieuport LN.401	France		1938		68	
Martin 167 Maryland	US		1939		450	
Martin AM Mauler	US		1944		151	
Martin B-26 Marauder	US		1940		5,288	
Martin B-57 Canberra	US		1953		403	
Martin Baltimore	US		1941		1,575	
Martin BM	US		1929		35	
McDonnell Douglas F-15E Strike Eagle	US		1986		420	
McDonnell Douglas F/A-18 Hornet	US		1978		1,480	
Messerschmitt Bf 110	Nazi Germany		1936		6,170	
Mikoyan MiG-AT	USSR		1996	Prototype	2	
Mikoyan MiG-29K	USSR		1998	Operational	45	
Mikoyan-Gurevich MiG-23	USSR		1967		5,047	
Mikoyan-Gurevich MiG-27	USSR		1970		1,075	
Mitsubishi B2M	Empire of Japan		1929		206	
Mitsubishi B5M	Empire of Japan		1937		125	
Mitsubishi F-1	Japan		1975		77	
Mitsubishi F-2	Japan		1995		94	
Mitsubishi Ki-30	Empire of Japan		1937		704	
Mitsubishi Ki-51	Empire of Japan		1939		2,385	
Nakajima B5N	Empire of Japan		1937		1,150 c.	
Nakajima B6N	Empire of Japan		1941		1,268	
Nakajima Ki-4	Empire of Japan		1933		516	
Nanchang Q-5	China		1965		1,300 c.	
Brewster SBA/Naval Aircraft Factory SBN	US		1936		31	
Neman R-10	USSR		1936		500+	
North American A-2 Savage	US		1948	Retired	143	
North American A-27	US		1940	Retired	10	
North American A-36 Apache	US		1942	Retired	500	
North American A-5 Vigilante	US		1958	Retired	156	
North American B-25 Mitchell	US		1940	Retired	9,984	
North American NA-44	US		1938	Prototype	1	
North American NA-72	US		1940	Retired	30	
North American Rockwell OV-10 Bronco	US		1965	Operational	360	
North American T-28 Trojan	US		1949	Retired	1,948	
North American T-6 Texan	US		1940	Retired	15,495	
Northrop A-17	US		1935	Retired	411	
Northrop BT	US		1935	Retired	55	
Northrop Gamma 2C & 2E	US		1933	Retired	52 c.	
Panavia Tornado	UK, Germany & Italy		1974	Operational	796	
Petlyakov Pe-2	USSR		1939	Retired	11,427	
Polikarpov R-5	USSR		1928	Retired	7,000 c.	
Polikarpov R-Z	USSR		1935	Retired	1,031	
Potez 15	France		1921	Retired	687	
Potez 25	France		1924	Retired	4,000 c.	
PWS-1	Poland		1927	Prototype	1	
PWS-19	Poland		1931	Prototype	1	
PZL.23 Karaś	Poland		1932	Retired	253	
PZL.38 Wilk	Poland		1936	Prototype	2	
PZL-42	Poland		1936	Prototype	2	
PZL.43	Poland		1936	Retired	53	
PZL.46 Sum	Poland		1938	Prototype	2	
PZL TS-11 Iskra	Poland		1960	Retired	500	
PZL I-22 Iryda	Poland		1985	Retired	16	
Republic AP-100	US		1957	Cancelled	0	
Republic F-105 Thunderchief	US		1955	Retired	833	
Republic F-84 Thunderjet	US		1946	Retired	7,524	
Republic P-47 Thunderbolt	US		1941	Retired	15,660	
Royal Aircraft Factory R.E.8	UK		1916	Retired	4,077	
Saab 17	Sweden		1940	Retired	323	
Saab 105	Sweden		1963	Retired	192	
Saab 32 Lansen	Sweden		1952	Retired	450	
Saab 37 Viggen	Sweden		1967	Retired	329	
Saab JAS 39 Gripen	Sweden		1988	Operational	247 c.	
Saab Supporter	Sweden		1971	Operational	462	
Salmson 4 AB.2	France		1918	Retired	12	
Savoia-Marchetti SM.85	Kingdom of Italy		1936	Retired	34	
SEPECAT Jaguar	UK & France		1968	Operational	573	
SET 7	Romania		1931	Retired	123	
SIAI-Marchetti SM.1019	Italy		1969	Retired	86	
Soko 522	Yugoslavia		1955	Retired	110 c.	
Soko G-2 Galeb	Yugoslavia		1961	Operational	248	
Soko G-4 Super Galeb	Yugoslavia		1978	Operational	85	
Soko J-20 Kraguj	Yugoslavia		1962	Retired	85	
Soko J-21 Jastreb	Yugoslavia		1965	Retired	121	
Soko J-22 Orao	Yugoslavia		1974	Operational	250-300	
Sopwith Salamander	UK		1918	Retired	497	
Sud Aviation Vautour	France		1952	Retired	149	
Sukhoi Su-17/20/22	USSR		1966	Operational	2,867	
Sukhoi Su-2	USSR		1937	Retired	910	
Sukhoi Su-24	USSR		1967	Operational	1,400	
Sukhoi Su-25	USSR		1975	Operational	1,024	
Sukhoi Su-27	USSR		1977	Operational	809	
Sukhoi Su-30	USSR		1989	Operational	509+	
Sukhoi Su-34	USSR		1990	Operational	50	
Sukhoi Su-35	Russia		2008	Operational	48	
Sukhoi Su-6	USSR		1941	Prototype	3	
Sukhoi Su-7B	USSR		1955	Operational	1,847	
Tachikawa Ki-36	Empire of Japan		1938	Retired	1,334	
Tupolev Tu-2	USSR		1941	Retired	2,257	
Vickers Vildebeest	UK		1928	Retired	209	
Vickers Vincent	UK		1932	Retired	197	
Vought A-7 Corsair II	US		1965	Retired	1,569	
Vought F4U Corsair	US		1940	Retired	12,571	
Vought SB2U Vindicator	US		1936	Retired	260	
Vought SBU Corsair	US		1933	Retired	125	
Vultee V-11, V-12 and A-19	US		1935	Retired	224	
Vultee Vengeance	US		1941	Retired	1,931	
Westland Lysander	UK		1936	Retired	1,786	
Westland Wallace	UK		1931	Retired	172	
Westland Whirlwind	UK		1938	Retired	116	
Westland Wyvern	UK		1946	Retired	127	
Xian JH-7	China		1988	Operational	240	
Yokosuka B4Y	Empire of Japan		1935	Retired	205	
Yokosuka D4Y	Empire of Japan		1940	Retired	2,038	

== See also ==
- List of fighter aircraft
- List of bomber aircraft
