= LWS-7 Mewa II =

General information
- Type: Reconnaissance
- Manufacturer: LWS
- Primary user: Polish Air Force
- Number built: None, project only

The LWS-7 Mewa II ("Seagull") was a Polish observation and close reconnaissance aircraft, designed in the 1939 by the LWS factory as a development of the earlier LWS-3 Mewa. Aircraft development was ordered by the Polish Air Force, but no prototypes were built.

== Design and development ==
In 1939, the LWS-7 Mewa II was being developed at the LWS as the development of the LWS-3 Mewa. New wings and a semi-monocoque fuselage with less drag were introduced. It was to be fitted with a more powerful 916 hp (683 kW) PZL Pegaz XX engine (Bristol Pegasus XX) or a planned 1000 hp (750 kW) PZL Waran. A maximum speed of 400–420 km/h was estimated.

Before the war, only a wooden model for aerodynamics tests was made. Tests performed by Aerodynamic Institute of Warsaw University of Technology showed that the maximum speed of the LWS-7 could be estimated at 420–425 km/h - about 60 km/h more than the LWS-3 Mewa.

Complete technical drawings were prepared in Summer 1939 (still not confirmed) and the first prototype was planned to be built in Autumn 1939. First flight was planned in Spring or Summer 1940 and start of production was planned for Autumn/Winter 1940. The first production LWS-7 Mewa II would be handed over to Polish Air Force in early 1941. All these plans were halted due to the outbreak of World War II.

Drawings of LWS-7 were evacuated in September 1939 to the Polish embassy in Romania by the LWS director Aleksander Sipowicz. Many publications claim that they were handed over to Bulgarians, but it is not clear (possibly, it concerned the LWS-3B plans, in fact).

== Operators (planned) ==
Poland

- Polish Air Force

== Specifications (planned) ==
Data from

General characteristics

- Crew: 2
- Length: 9.5 m (31 ft 2 in)
- Wingspan: 13.45 m (44 ft 2 in)
- Height: 2.65 m (8 ft 8 in)
- Wing area: 26 m^{2} (280 sq ft)
- Empty weight: 1,750 kg (3,858 lb)
- Gross weight: 2,420 kg (5,335 lb)
- Powerplant: 1 × PZL-Bristol Pegasus XX or PZL-Bristol Pegasus XIX 9-cylinder air cooled radial piston engine, 683 kW (916 hp)
- Propellers: 3-bladed metal variable-pitch propeller

Performance

- Maximum speed: 420 km/h (260 mph, 230 kn) - 425 km/h (229 kn; 264 mph)

Armament

- Guns: 2× fixed, forward-firing 7.92 mm KM Wz.36 machine guns, 1× rearward-firing 7.92 mm KM Wz.37 machine gun for the observer

== See also ==
Related development

- LWS-3 Mewa

Aircraft of comparable role, configuration, and era

- Henschel Hs 126
- Westland Lysander
- KB-11 Fazan
- WM-21 Solyom
- IAR-39
