= Lubelska Wytwórnia Samolotów =

Polish aerospace manufacturer

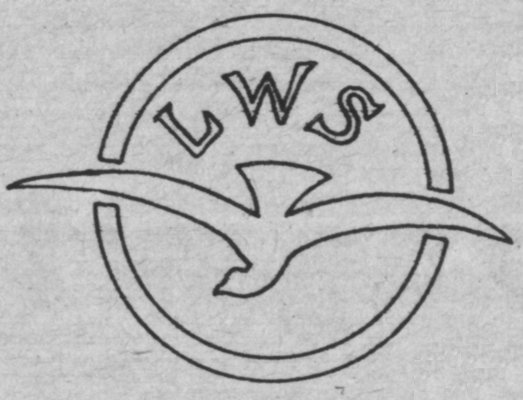
- Industry: Aerospace
- Predecessor: Plage i Laśkiewicz
- Founded: 1936
- Headquarters: Lublin, Poland
- Key people: Ryszard Bartel; Zbysław Ciołkosz; Jerzy Teisseyre
- Parent: Podlaska Wytwórnia Samolotów (1936–1939)

Lubelska Wytwórnia Samolotów (LWS; translation from Polish: Lublin Aircraft Factory) was a Polish aerospace manufacturer, located in Lublin, created in 1936 from Plage i Laśkiewicz works and produced aircraft between 1936 and 1939.

== History ==
The LWS was created out of the nationalized Plage i Laśkiewicz works, the first Polish aircraft manufacturer. Due to plans of the Polish military aviation authorities, headed by Ludomił Rayski, to gather all aviation industry in state hands, Plage & Laśkiewicz works were forced to go bankrupt in late 1935. Then, they were nationalized under the name LWS in February 1936. While formally it was owned by the PWS state aircraft manufacturer, in fact it was subordinated to the PZL. A director was Maj. Aleksander Sipowicz, a technical director and the main designer was initially Zbysław Ciołkosz; from autumn 1937 the technical director was Ryszard Bartel and the main designer Jerzy Teisseyre.

The first LWS aircraft were Plage & Laśkiewicz developments. 18 almost ready Lublin R-XIIIF army cooperation aircraft were completed in 1936 and bought by the Polish Air Force (their quality was the pretext for forcing Plage & Laśkiewicz bankruptcy), and the next series of 32 was built for the Polish Air Force by 1938. The factory also continued works upon a two-engine torpedo bomber seaplane Lublin R-XX prototype, now designated LWS-1, but it was not ordered due to a low performance.

In 1937 a light ambulance aircraft LWS-2 prototype of Ciołkosz design was first flown, but despite it was quite successful, it did not enter production, since the factory was busy with military orders.

In 1936, a further development of the medium bomber PZL-30 of Ciołkosz design, was handed to the LWS, under a designation LWS-6 Żubr. Since it was much inferior to PZL.37 Łoś, a planned serial production was finally reduced to 15 aircraft, built in 1938. However, works upon its modernized variant continued until 1939. The factory also proposed its torpedo-bomber seaplane variant designated LWS-5, but it was not accepted due to a low performance and the prototype was not completed.

From 1938 to 1939 the LWS built a series of 65 licence RWD-14 Czapla army cooperation aircraft for the Polish Air Force (it was sometimes called the LWS Czapla after the manufacturer). In 1937, there was flown a prototype of a modern reconnaissance aircraft LWS-3 Mewa of own design. A series of 200 aircraft was ordered by the Polish Air Force, but only a couple were completed just after the outbreak of World War II, and about 30 were in not finished state in a factory.

Apart from aircraft production, the LWS modified 47 Potez XXV light bombers (licence produced in Plage & Laśkiewicz and PWS) fitting them with radial engines PZL (Bristol) Jupiter. The LWS also designed the LWS-4 light fighter and LWS-7 Mewa II reconnaissance plane, but they were not built.

During World War II, the former factory became part of the Majdanek concentration camp.

== Aircraft ==
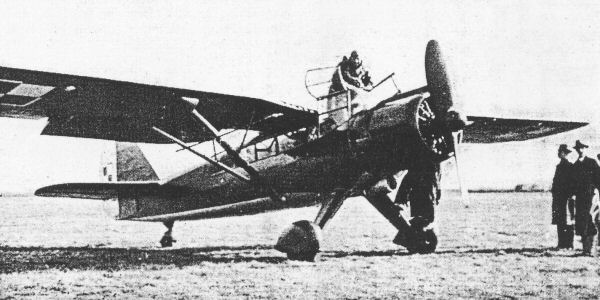
LWS-3

Model name	First flight	Number built	Type
LWS-1	1935	1	Two engine monoplane torpedo bomber seaplane
LWS-2	1937	1	Single engine monoplane ambulance airplane
LWS-3 Mewa	1938	20 (Note: At the start of World War II, of the 20 aircraft built, only 5 (including 3 prototypes) were airworthy, with 10 missing their propellers and 5 awaiting paint. Another 13 were still being assembled.)	Single engine monoplane liaison airplane
LWS-4	N/A	0	Single engine monoplane fighter
LWS-5	N/A	0	Two engine monoplane medium bomber floatplane
LWS-6 Żubr	1937	16	Two engine monoplane medium bomber
LWS-7 Mewa II	N/A	0	Single engine monoplane liaison airplane
LWS Czapla		65	License built single engine monoplane liaison airplane
