= LWS-2 =

Polish prototype ambulance aircraft

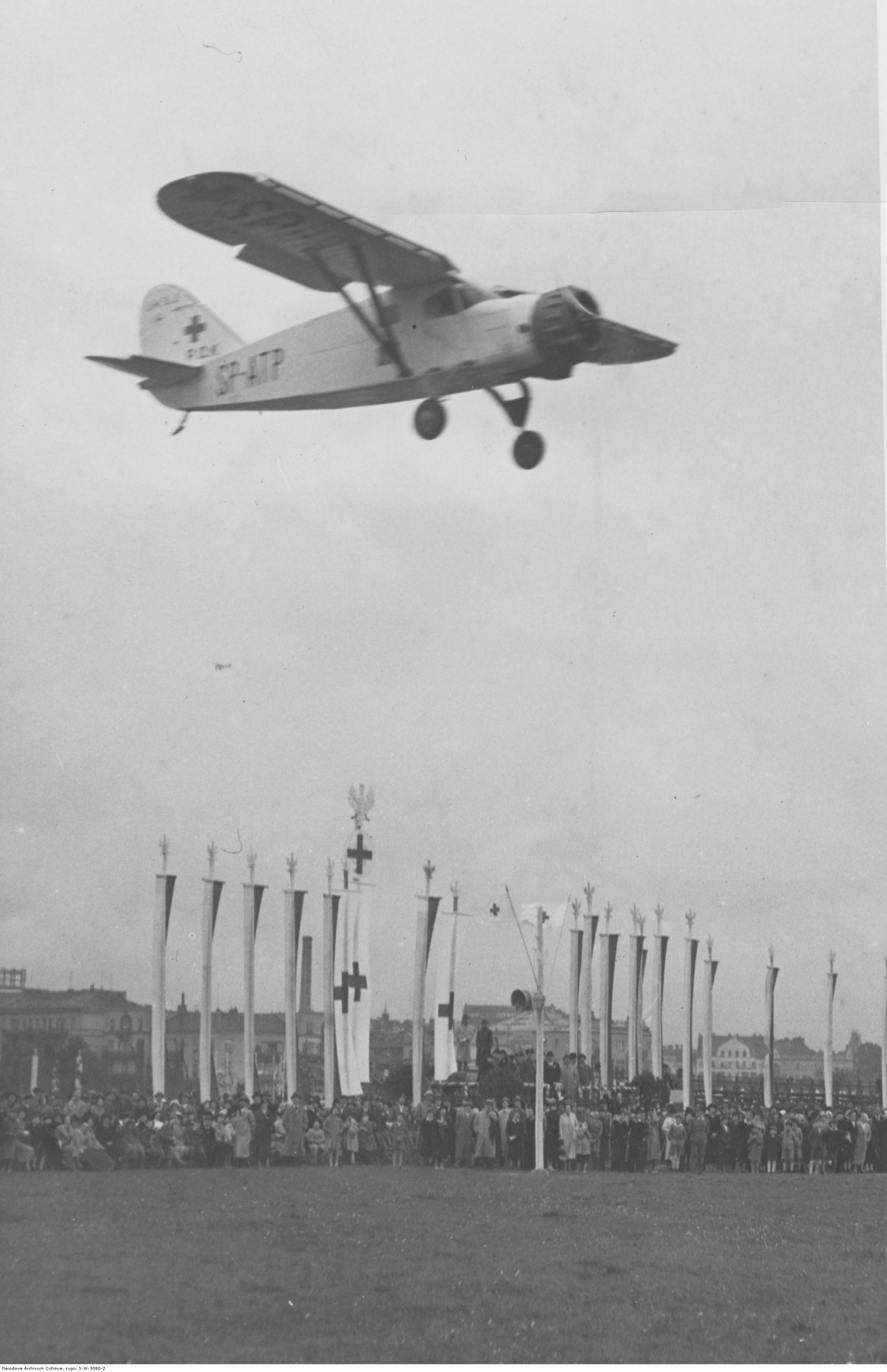
- The LWS-2 in flight, during an aircraft meeting in Poland (may 1938).

General information
- Type: Air ambulance
- National origin: Poland
- Manufacturer: LWS
- Status: Prototype
- Primary user: Poland
- Number built: 1

History
- Manufactured: 1937
- Introduction date: May 19, 1938
- First flight: Autumn 1937

The LWS-2 was the Polish air ambulance aircraft prototype, designed in the late-1930s in the LWS factory (Lublin Aircraft Factory).

== Design and development ==
The LWS-2 was designed as a light ambulance aircraft, for a requirement of the Polish Air Force and the Polish Red Cross (PCK), which was operating military ambulances. A preliminary design was made in 1936 by Zbysław Ciołkosz, the main designer of the LWS factory, follower by Jerzy Teisseyre's detailed design. It was influenced by RWD-9 and RWD-13 planes of the RWD team, especially their wing construction with rich wing mechanization, that gave it STOL capabilities. The prototype was built using PCK funds. Aircraft was registered SP-ATP and flown in autumn of 1937.

The Polish Red Cross ordered six aircraft, but the LWS factory was busy at that time with military production (RWD-14 Czapla and LWS-3 Mewa), and they were not built by the outbreak of World War II. LWS's next design, the LWS-3 Mewa close reconnaissance plane, utilized many features of the LWS-2, and was generally similar.

=== Description ===
Mixed construction (steel and wood) braced high-wing monoplane, conventional in layout. Fuselage of a steel frame, canvas covered (engine part with duralumin). Two-spar straight wings of wooden construction, with slats, flaps and flaperons, covered with canvas and plywood (in front), rectangular with rounded tips and narrowing near the fuselage. The wings were supported with V-struts and were folding rearwards. Cantilever empennage, covered with plywood (stabilizers) and canvas (rudder and elevators). Conventional fixed landing gear, with a rear skid. Capacity of four in a closed cockpit: a pilot in front, a doctor behind him, and two lying on stretchers at the back. It had a 9-cylinder air-cooled Avia-built Wright Whirlwind J-5 radial engine delivering 220 hp (164 kW) nominal power and 240 hp (179 kW) take-off power. Two-blade metal propeller Ratier, of variable pitch. A 130-liter fuel tank behind the engine. Cruise fuel consumption 48 L/h.

== Operational history ==
On May 19, 1938 the prototype was given to the Air Force. Between July 1 and July 4, 1938, the LWS-2 prototype took part in an International Ambulance Aircraft Contest in Esch in Luxembourg, and won first place and a cup for the best accommodation in a cab for the injured.

The prototype was later used by the Polish Red Cross. Its fate during the World War II is not clear, as the damaged plane was captured by the Germans on airfield at Krosno.

== Operators ==
Poland

- Polish Red Cross operated one prototype, ordered 6 aircraft, none delivered.

== Specifications (LWS-2) ==
Data from Polish aircraft 1893-1939, Polskie konstrukcje lotnicze 1893–1939

General characteristics

- Crew: 1
- Capacity: 2 stretcher patients with a medical orderly
- Length: 9.05 m (29 ft 8 in)
- Wingspan: 13 m (42 ft 8 in)
- Height: 2.84 m (9 ft 4 in)
- Wing area: 22 m^{2} (240 sq ft)
- Empty weight: 1,040 kg (2,293 lb)
- Gross weight: 1,680 kg (3,704 lb)
- Fuel capacity: 130 L (34 US gal; 29 imp gal)
- Powerplant: 1 × Avia-Wright J-5 Whirlwind 9-cylinder air-cooled radial piston engine, 175 kW (235 hp)
- Propellers: 2-bladed Ratier adjustable-pitch metal propeller

Performance

- Maximum speed: 206 km/h (128 mph, 111 kn) at sea level
- Cruise speed: 185 km/h (115 mph, 100 kn)
- Stall speed: 75 km/h (47 mph, 40 kn)
- Range: 500 km (310 mi, 270 nmi)
- Service ceiling: 4,000 m (13,000 ft)
- Rate of climb: 3.8 m/s (750 ft/min)
- Wing loading: 76.3 kg/m^{2} (15.6 lb/sq ft)
- Power/mass: 0.105 kW/kg (0.064 hp/lb)

== See also ==
Related development

- LWS-3 Mewa

Aircraft of comparable role, configuration, and era

- RWD-13S
