= 25th Air Support Operations Squadron =

25th Air Support Operations Squadron

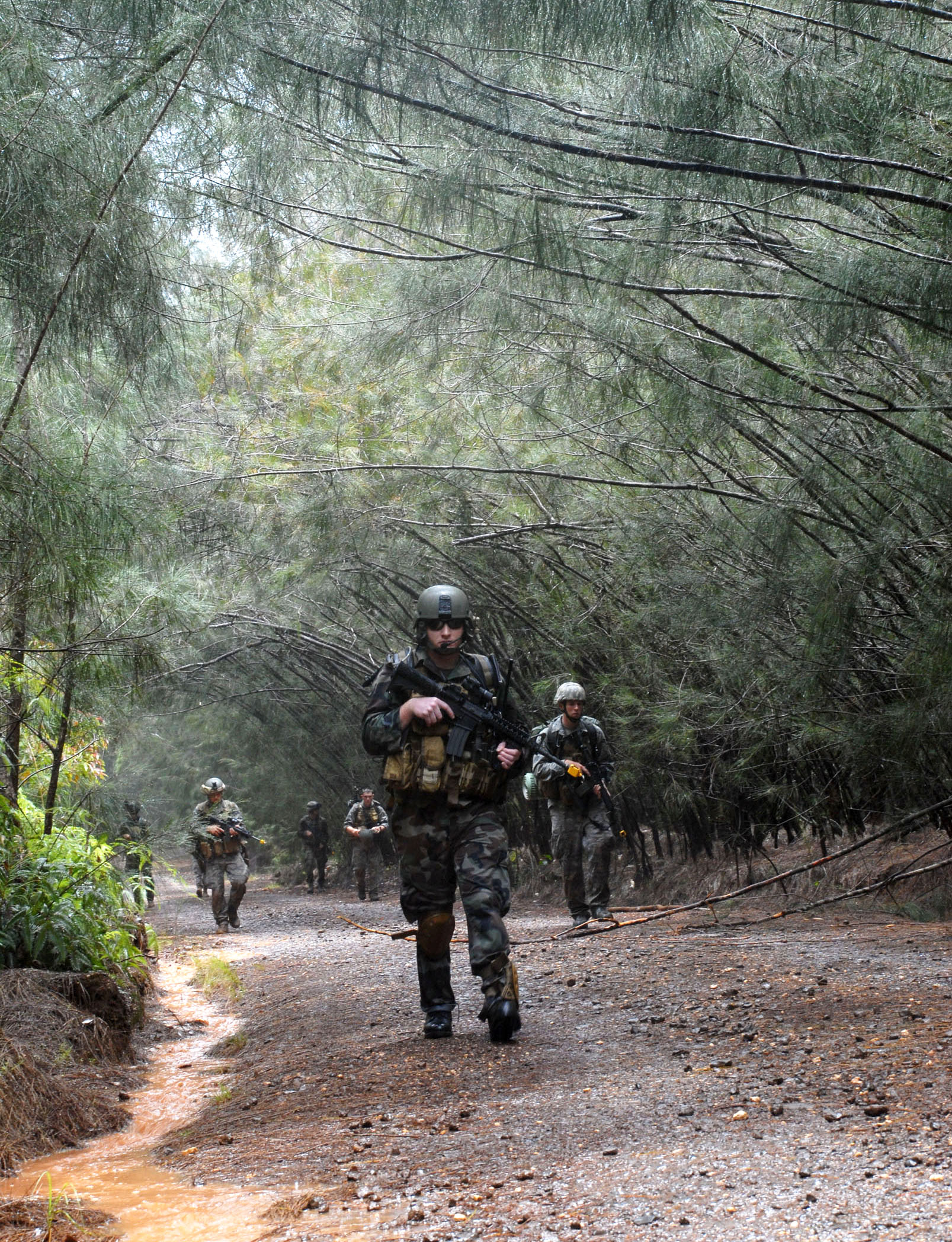
- Tactical Air Control Party airmen of the 25th Air Support Operations Squadron at Wheeler Army Airfield's East Range
- Active: 1942–1949; 1971–1989; 1990–present
- Country: United States
- Branch: United States Air Force
- Role: Air Operation Support
- Engagements: South West Pacific Theater of World War II
- Decorations: Distinguished Unit Citation; Philippine Republic Presidential Unit Citation

Insignia
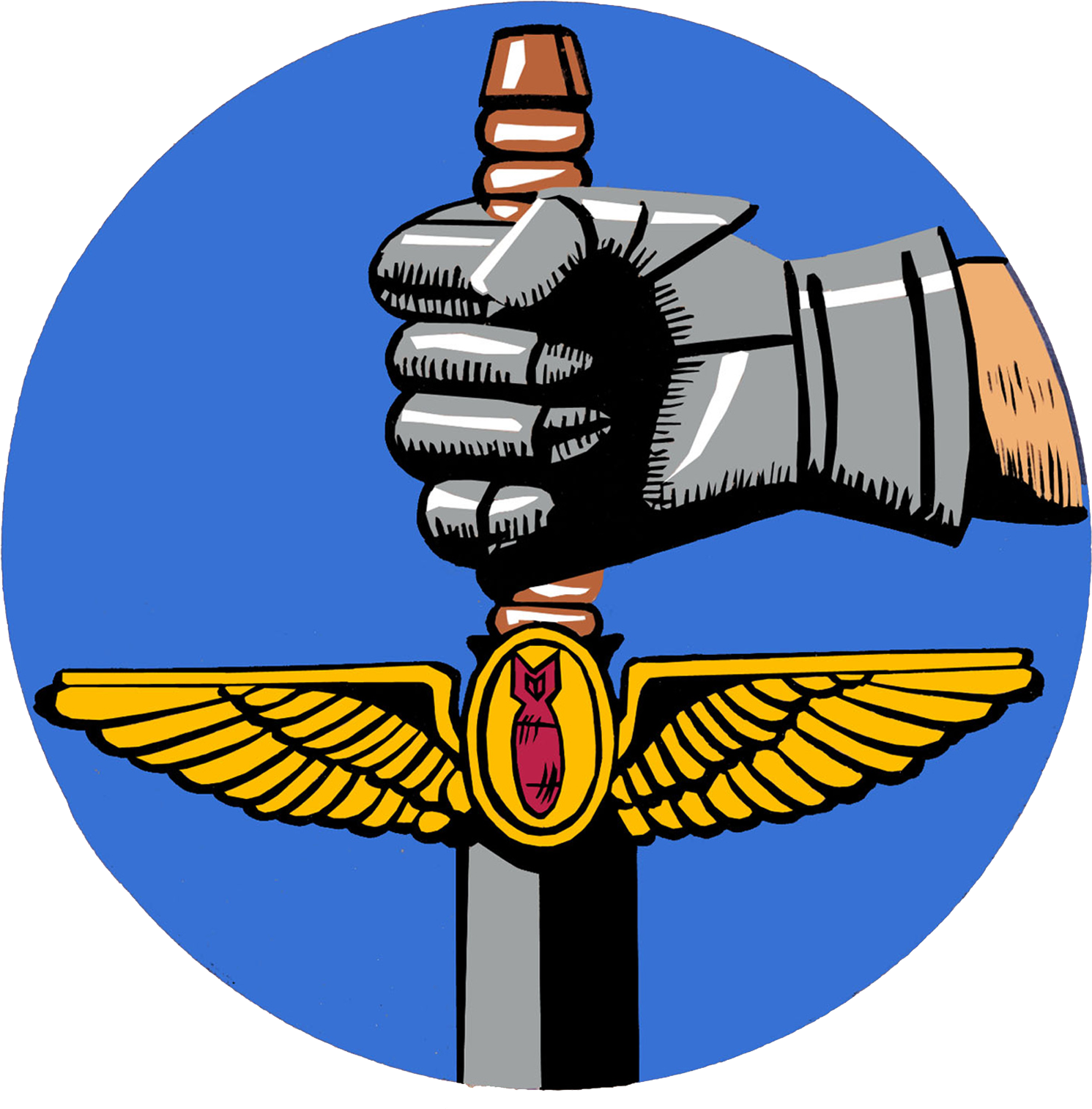
- 25th Air Support Operations Squadron emblem (approved 18 January 1943)

The United States Air Force's 25th Air Support Operations Squadron is an Air Force Special Warfare unit located at Wheeler Army Airfield, Hawaii. The squadron provides tactical command and control of air and space assets to the Joint Forces Air Component Commander and Joint Forces Land Component Commander for combat operations.

== History ==
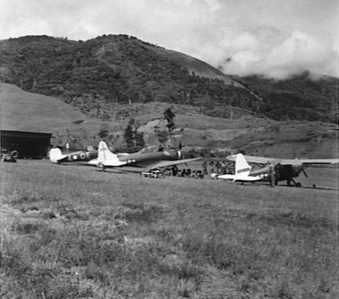
25th Liaison Squadron L-5 and other aircraft at Wau airfield New Guinea 1944

=== World War II and post-war error ===
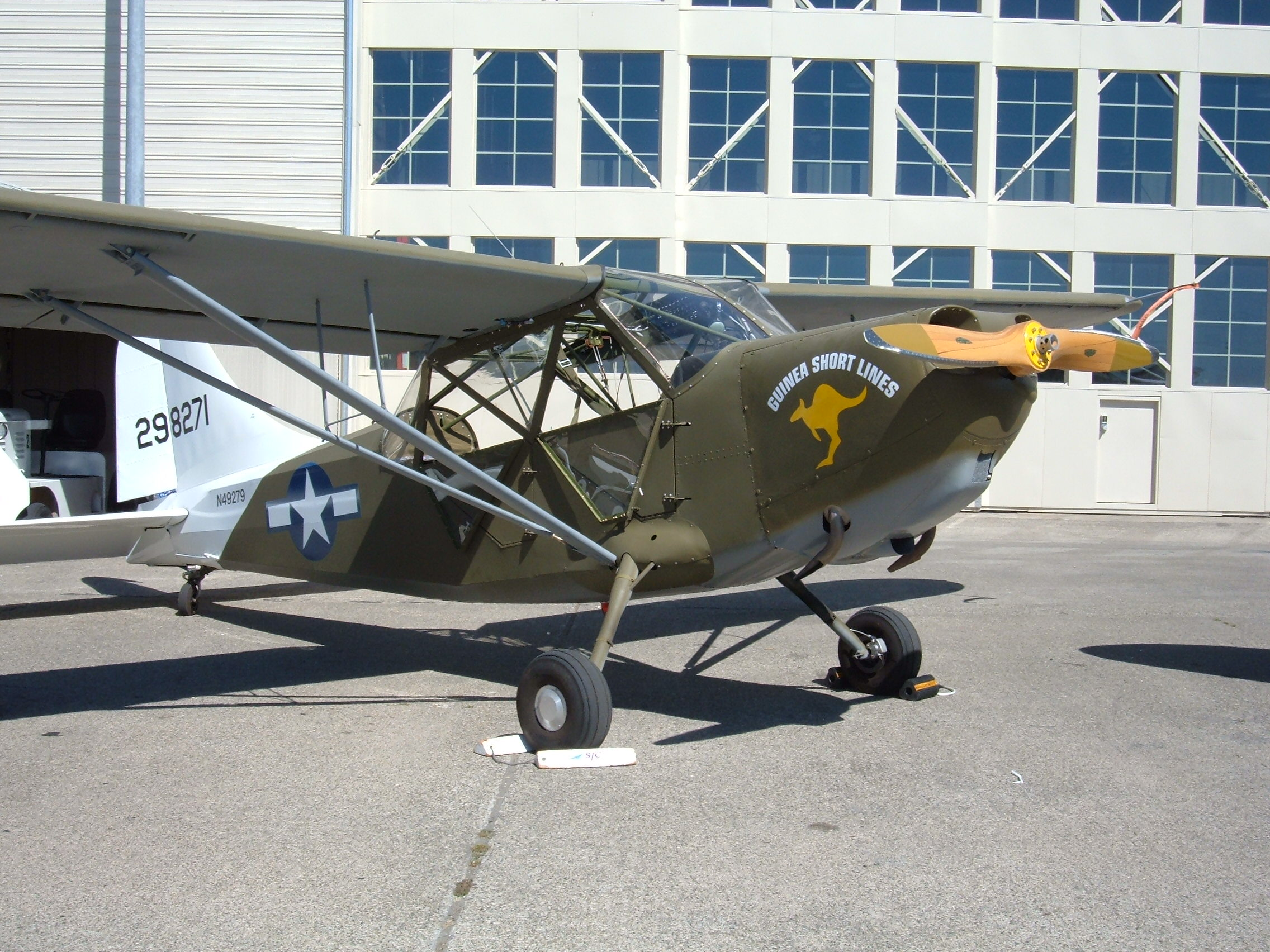
L-5 restored in markings of the Guinea Short Lines

The squadron was first activated at Salinas Army Air Base, California in March 1942 as the 25th Observation Squadron. The squadron's cadre came from the 110th Observation Squadron, a federalized unit of the Missouri National Guard. Initially, the primary aircraft of the squadron was the North American O-47, although it flew a number of other aircraft as well. In April 1943 it was redesignated the 25th Liaison Squadron and converted to light two-seater aircraft. primarily Piper L-4s, but also including Stinson L-5 Sentinel. The unit moved overseas in October 1943 aboard the Cape Mendocino to Australia in the South West Pacific Theater.

After pausing briefly in Australia, the squadron moved to New Guinea. There it operated primarily with L-5 Sentinels, flown by enlisted pilots. Some of these "sergeant pilots" were men who had washed out of pilot school, but had been given a chance to operate the light aircraft. Beginning in February 1944, the 25th began participating in combat operations.

In addition to their mission of spotting and aerial reconnaissance, the squadron was tasked with short haul transportation. The capability of its light aircraft to operate from confined spaces earned A Flight of the squadron the nickname "Guinea Short Lines". The flight moved forward to Saidor Airport.

The squadron dropped supplies to units caught behind enemy lines and evacuated them, sometimes dropping tools so that these units could hack a landing zone out of the jungle. In addition to the task of evacuating downed aircrew members, the flight flew night harassment missions behind enemy lines, dropping small bombs and other paraphernalia on enemy camps. The flight was called on in 1944 to rescue a downed Republic P-47 Thunderbolt pilot from behind enemy lines. In the course of this operation, and while the downed pilot was clearing an area for an L-5 to land in the jungle, the squadron was tasked to also evacuate 23 Indian soldiers, who had escaped from a Japanese prisoner of war camp and who had intelligence information concerning Japanese troop positions. Flying into the improvised jungle airstrip, the flight successfully returned all to friendly control.

Shortly after this rescue operation, the flight was tasked with transporting fifty Australian commandos to Wantoat to attack a Japanese radio facility. Following the raid, four Japanese prisoners were returned, each sitting on the lap of an Australian in the back seat of one of the Sentinels.

By the end of 1944, the 25th began operating in the Philippines, earning two Distinguished Unit Citations and a Philippine Republic Presidential Unit Citation for its actions there. During the Philippine campaign, the squadron also trained pilots of the liaison squadrons of the 3d Air Commando Group, which had just arrived in the theater. It remained in the Philippines until August 1947, although it was not manned or equipped after January. Although it moved on paper to Kadena Air Base, Okinawa in August, it was not again manned until October 1947. It remained with the occupation forces on Okinawa until being inactivated in March 1949.

=== Modern era ===
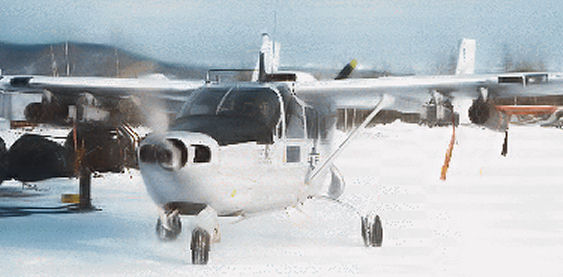
25th Tactical Air Support Squadron O-2A at Eielson AFB

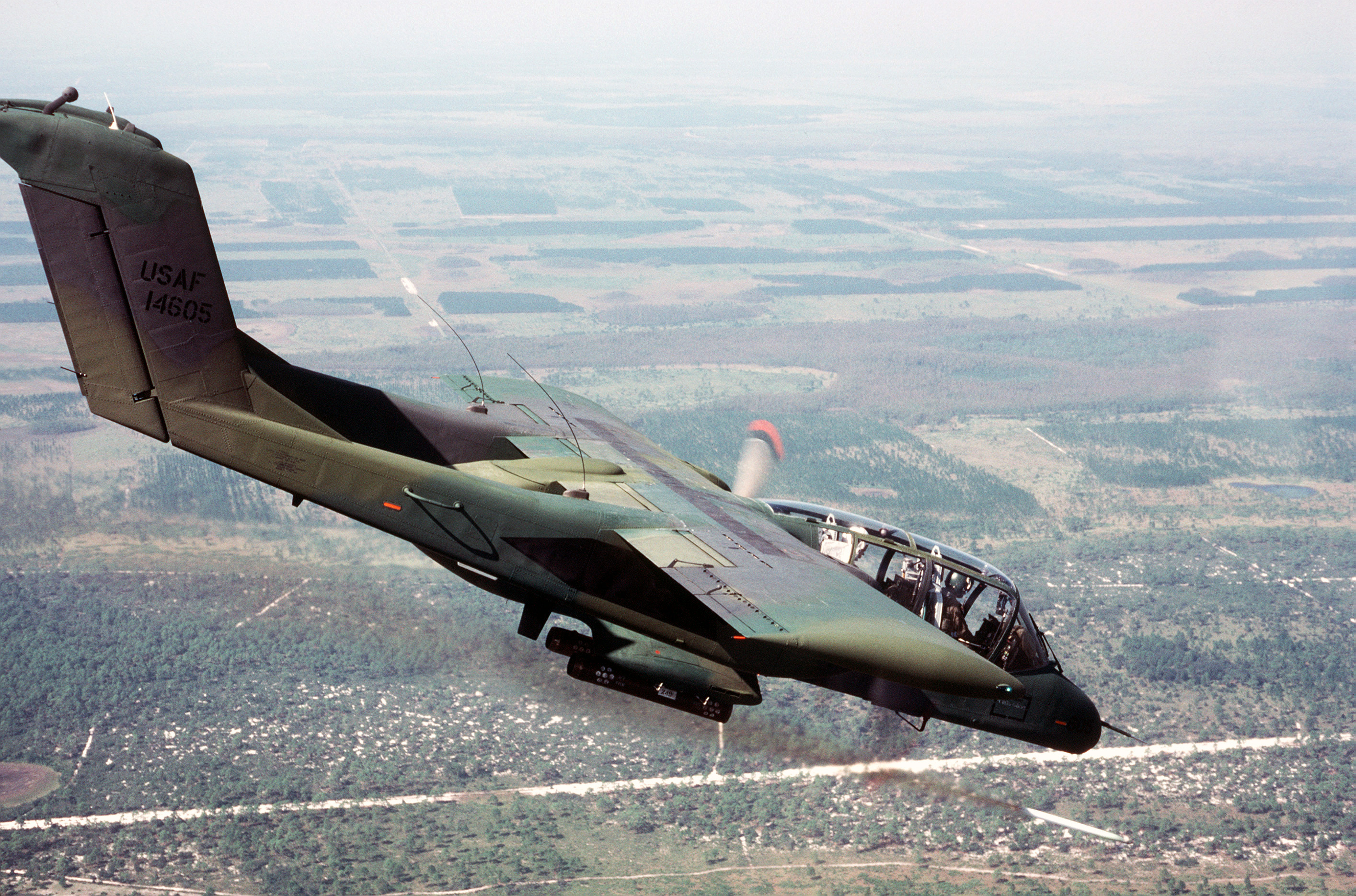
OV-10 Bronco firing White phosphorus

The squadron was again activated in July 1971 at Eielson Air Force Base, Alaska, as the 25th Tactical Air Support Squadron and equipped with the Cessna O-2 Skymaster. In 1986 the 25th upgraded to the North American OV-10 Bronco, 1986–1989. The squadron was inactivated in September 1989.

Its most current period of active service in Hawaii began a little more than a year later in 1990, when it was activated as the 25th Air Liaison Squadron at Schofield Barracks. Three months later the squadron moved to Wheeler Army Airfield. The unit has deployed in support of Air Force and Army missions. The squadron is manned by tactical air controllers, a unique type of servicemembers—Air Force by service, but Army by trade, planning, communicating and facilitating the execution of close- air support for ground forces. To assist in their communication needs, the JTACs operate and maintain a complete array of equipment. Tactical Air Control is also one of the few jobs in the Air Force operates far forward on the battlefield.

The 25th deployed to Afghanistan in 2006. They were located everywhere from headquarters to operations with company-sized elements, acting as the liaison for all air support that comes from all services and coalition partners. Their mission of calling in air support requires communication and planning. Planning includes advising leaders on the best ways to use air assets and coordinate so that close air support can operate safely on the battlefield with other indirect-fire assets, such as artillery and mortars.

== Lineage ==
- Constituted as the 25th Observation Squadron (Light) on 5 February 1942

Activated on 2 March 1942

- Redesignated 25th Observation Squadron on 4 July 1942
- Redesignated 25th Liaison Squadron on 2 April 1943

Inactivated on 25 March 1949

- Redesignated 25th Tactical Air Support Squadron on 30 March 1971

Activated on 8 July 1971
Inactivated on 15 September 1989

- Redesignated 25th Air Liaison Squadron on 26 September 1990

Activated on 1 October 1990

- Redesignated 25th Air Support Operations Squadron on 1 August 1994

=== Assignments ===
- 71st Observation Group (later 71st Reconnaissance Group): 2 March 1942
- II Air Support Command (later II Tactical Air Division): 11 August 1943 (attached to 71st Reconnaissance Group)
- Fifth Air Force: 19 November 1943 (attached to 71st Reconnaissance Group)
- V Bomber Command: 24 November 1943 (attached to 71st Reconnaissance Group) (further attached to 5212th Photographic Wing (Provisional) after 13 December 1943)
- 91st Photographic Wing: 15 April 1944 (attached to 71st Reconnaissance Group)
- Far East Air Forces: 15 February 1945 (attached to Thirteenth Air Force)
- Thirteenth Air Force: 17 March 1945
- 403d Troop Carrier Group: 1 November 1945
- Thirteenth Air Force: 31 December 1945
- 85th Fighter Wing: 5 July 1946
- 1st Air Division: 30 March 1947
- Thirteenth Air Force: 15 September 1947
- Far East Air Forces: 1 December 1948 – 25 March 1949 (attached to 18th Fighter Wing)
- 5010th Combat Support Group: 8 July 1971
- 343d Composite Wing: (later 343d Tactical Fighter Wing): 1 October 1981 – 15 September 1989
- 15th Air Base Wing: 1 October 1990
- 6010th Aerospace Defense Group: 24 May 1991
- 15th Operations Group: 13 April 1992
- 1st Air Support Operations Group: 1 October 2008 – present

=== Stations ===
- Salinas Army Air Base, California, 2 March 1942
- Esler Field, Louisiana, 26 January 1943
- Laurel Army Air Field, Mississippi, 31 March 1943 – 20 October 1943
- Brisbane, Australia, 24 November 1943
- Lae Airfield, New Guinea, 11 February 1944
- Nadzab Airfield Complex, New Guinea, 16 February 1944
- Biak, New Guinea, 7 September 1944
- Camp Dulag, Leyte, Philippines, c. 5 March 1945
- Malabang, Mindanao, Philippines, 19 April 1945
- Del Monte Airfield, Mindanao, Philippines, 2 June 1945
- Dulag, Leyte, Philippines, 17 November 1945
- Clark Field, Luzon, Philippines, c. 10 January 1946
- Kadena Air Base, Okinawa, 22 August 1947
- Clark Field, Luzon, Philippines, 8 September 1947 – 25 March 1949
- Eielson Air Force Base, Alaska, 8 July 1971 – 15 September 1989
- Schofield Barracks, Hawaii, 1 October 1990
- Wheeler Army Airfield, 1 January 1991 – present

=== Aircraft ===
- North American O-47, 1942–1943
- Stinson L-1 Vigilant, 1942–1943
- Taylorcraft L-2, 1942–1943
- Bell P-39 Airacobra, 1942–1943
- Curtiss P-40 Warhawk, 1942–1943
- North American B-25 Mitchell, 1942–1943
- Stinson L-5 Sentinel, 1943–1947, 1947–1948, probably 1948–1949
- Piper L-4, 1944–
- Fairchild UC-61 Forwarder, 1944
- Cessna UC-78 Bobcat, 1944–1945
- Douglas C-47 Skytrain, 1945–1946
- Cessna O-2 Skymaster, 1979–1986
- North American OV-10 Bronco, 1986–1989

=== Awards and campaigns ===
Award streamer	Award	Dates	Notes
	Distinguished Unit Citation	Philippine Islands 10 December 1944 – 25 December 1944	25th Liaison Squadron
	Distinguished Unit Citation	Philippine Islands 17 April 1945 – 1 June 1945	25th Liaison Squadron
	Air Force Outstanding Unit Award	1 January 1973-31 December 1974	25th Tactical Air Support Squadron
	Air Force Outstanding Unit Award	1 January-31 December 1975	25th Tactical Air Support Squadron
	Air Force Outstanding Unit Award	1 January-31 December 1976	25th Tactical Air Support Squadron
	Air Force Outstanding Unit Award	1 January 1977-31 December 1978	25th Tactical Air Support Squadron
	Air Force Outstanding Unit Award	1 January-31 December 1979	25th Tactical Air Support Squadron
	Air Force Outstanding Unit Award	1 January 1980-30 September 1981	25th Tactical Air Support Squadron
	Air Force Outstanding Unit Award	1 January 1983-30 June 1984	25th Tactical Air Support Squadron
	Air Force Outstanding Unit Award	1 July 1985-30 June 1987	25th Tactical Air Support Squadron
	Air Force Outstanding Unit Award	1 January 1988–(15 September) 1989	25th Tactical Air Support Squadron
	Air Force Outstanding Unit Award	1 July 1991-30 June 1993	25th Air Liaison Squadron
	Air Force Outstanding Unit Award	1 August 1994-30 September 1995	25th Air Liaison Squadron (later 25th Air Support Operations Squadron)
	Air Force Outstanding Unit Award	1 October 1995-1 August 1997	25th Air Support Operations Squadron
	Air Force Outstanding Unit Award	2 August 1997-1 August 1999	25th Air Support Operations Squadron
	Air Force Outstanding Unit Award	29 November 1999-30 November 2001	25th Air Support Operations Squadron
	Air Force Outstanding Unit Award	1 November 2002–31 October 2004	25th Air Support Operations Squadron
	Air Force Outstanding Unit Award	1 November 2004–31 October 2006	25th Air Support Operations Squadron
	Air Force Outstanding Unit Award	1 November 2006–31 October 2007	25th Air Support Operations Squadron
	Air Force Outstanding Unit Award	1 November 2008–31 October 2010	25th Air Support Operations Squadron
	Philippine Republic Presidential Unit Citation	10 December 1944-4 July 1945	25th Liaison Squadron

Campaign Streamer	Campaign	Dates	Notes
	Antisubmarine	27 May 1942 – 20 August 1942	25th Observation Squadron
	New Guinea	11 February 1944 – 31 December 1944	25th Liaison Squadron
	Leyte	10 December 1944 – 1 July 1945	25th Liaison Squadron
	Luzon	5 March 1945 – 4 July 1945	25th Liaison Squadron
	Southern Philippines	5 March 1945 – 4 July 1945	25th Liaison Squadron
	Iraqi Governance	29 June 2004 – 15 December 2005	25th Air Support Operations Squadron
	National Resolution	16 December 2005 – 9 January 2007	25th Air Support Operations Squadron
	Iraqi Surge	10 January 2007 – 31 December 2008	25th Air Support Operations Squadron

== See also ==
- Liaison pilot
- Forward air control
- United States Air Force Tactical Air Control Party
- List of United States Air Force squadrons
