= Liaison aircraft =

Light aircraft for artillery observation and military communications

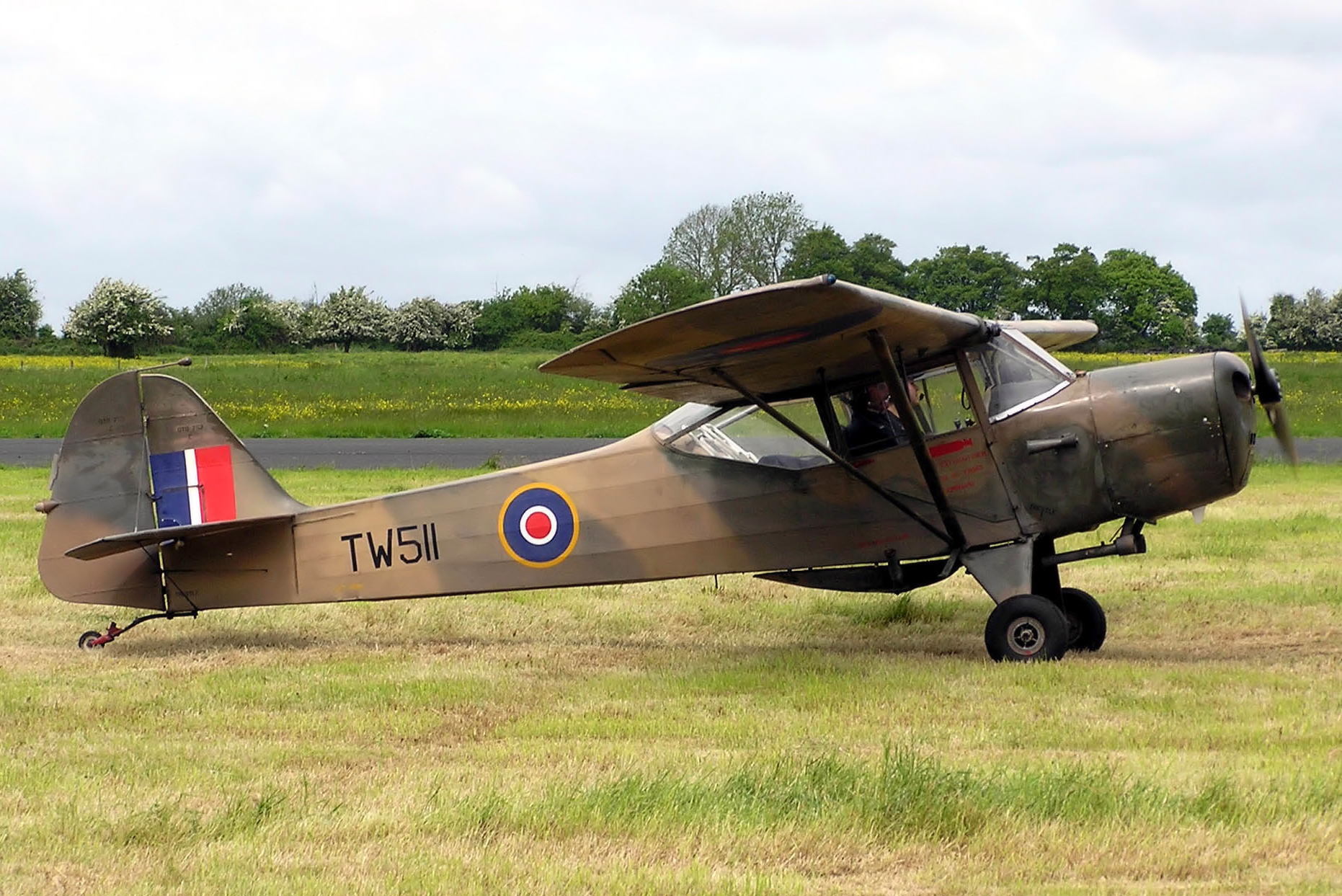
Taylorcraft Auster 5 liaison aircraft of 1957

A liaison aircraft (also called an army cooperation aircraft) is a small, usually unarmed aircraft primarily used by military forces for artillery observation or transporting commanders and messages.

== Operation ==
The concept developed before World War II and included also battlefield reconnaissance, air ambulance, column control, light cargo delivery and similar duties. Able to operate from small, unimproved fields under primitive conditions, with STOL capabilities, most liaison aircraft were developed from, or were later used as general aviation aircraft. Both fixed-wing aircraft and helicopters can perform liaison duties.

== Use by country ==
=== Argentina ===
(Fuerza Aérea Argentina)

- Piper Chincul PA-28 Dakota
- Piper Chincul PA-34 Seneca
- Cessna C-182
- Beechcraft TC-12B Huron

=== Bulgaria ===
- Kaproni Bulgarski KB-11 Fazan

=== Germany ===
Nazi period:

- Fieseler Fi 156 Storch
- Messerschmitt Bf 108 Taifun
- Focke-Wulf Fw 189 Uhu

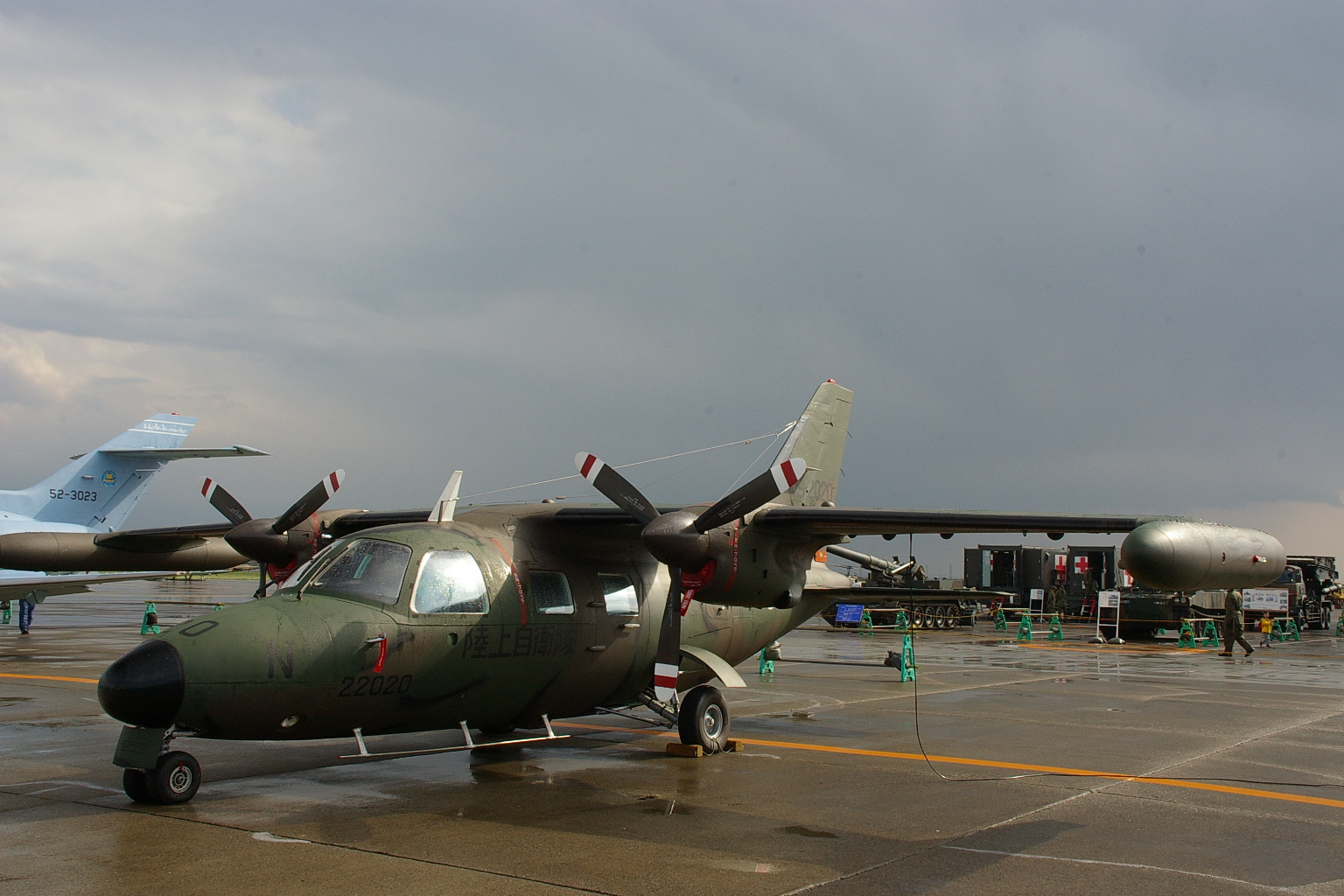
LR-1 of the Japanese Ground Self Defense Force

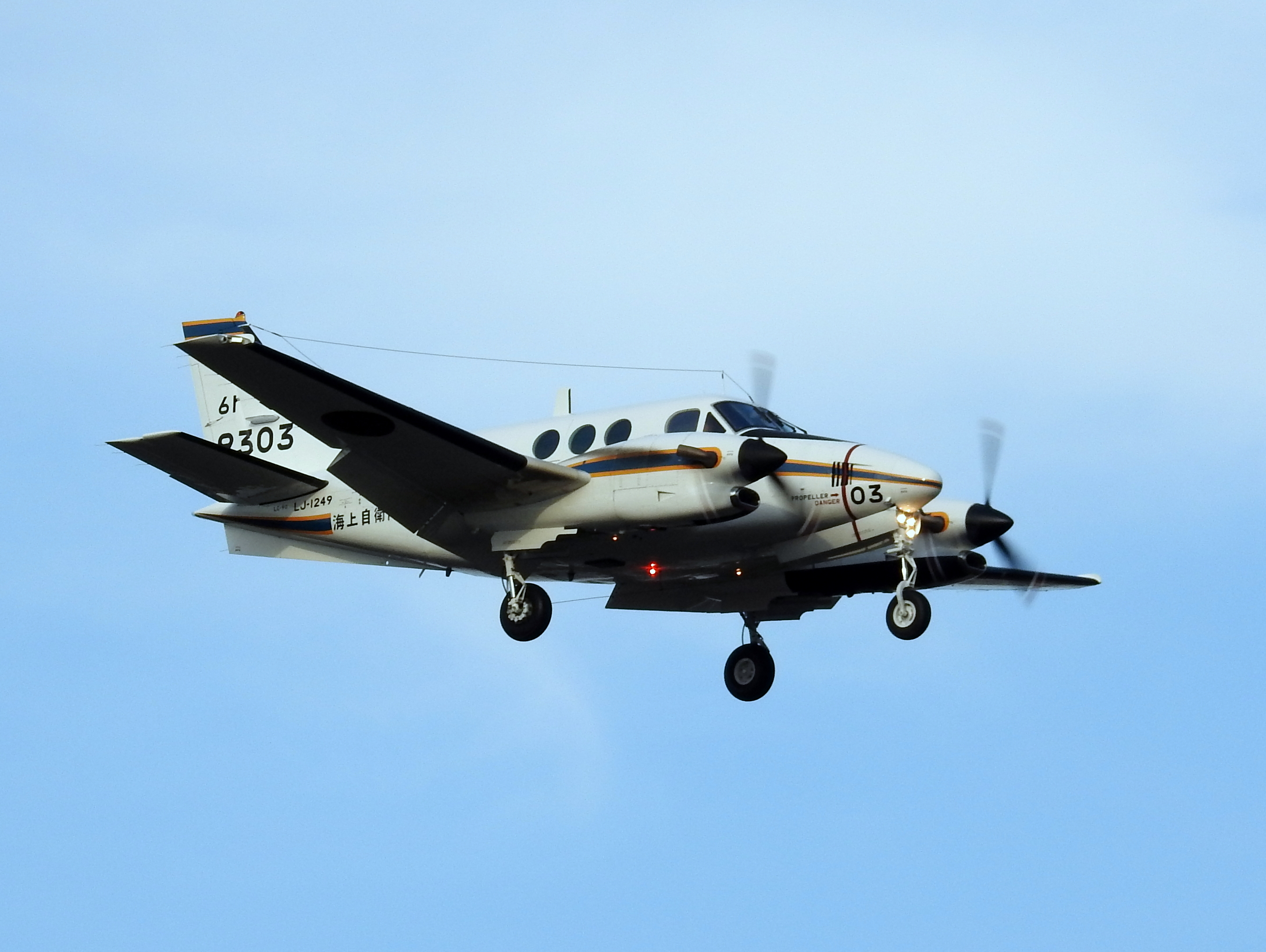
LC-90 of the Japan Maritime Self-Defence Force

=== Japan ===
Imperial period:

- Kokusai Ki-76 (Imperial Japanese Army Air Force, 1942–1945)
- Tachikawa Ki-36 (Imperial Japanese Army Air Force, 1938–1945)

Postwar period:

- LR-1 (Japan Ground Self-Defense Force, 1967–2016)
- LC-90 (Japan Maritime Self Defense Force, 1974–)

=== Poland ===
- Lublin R-XIII
- RWD-14 Czapla
- PZL Ł.2

=== Portugal ===
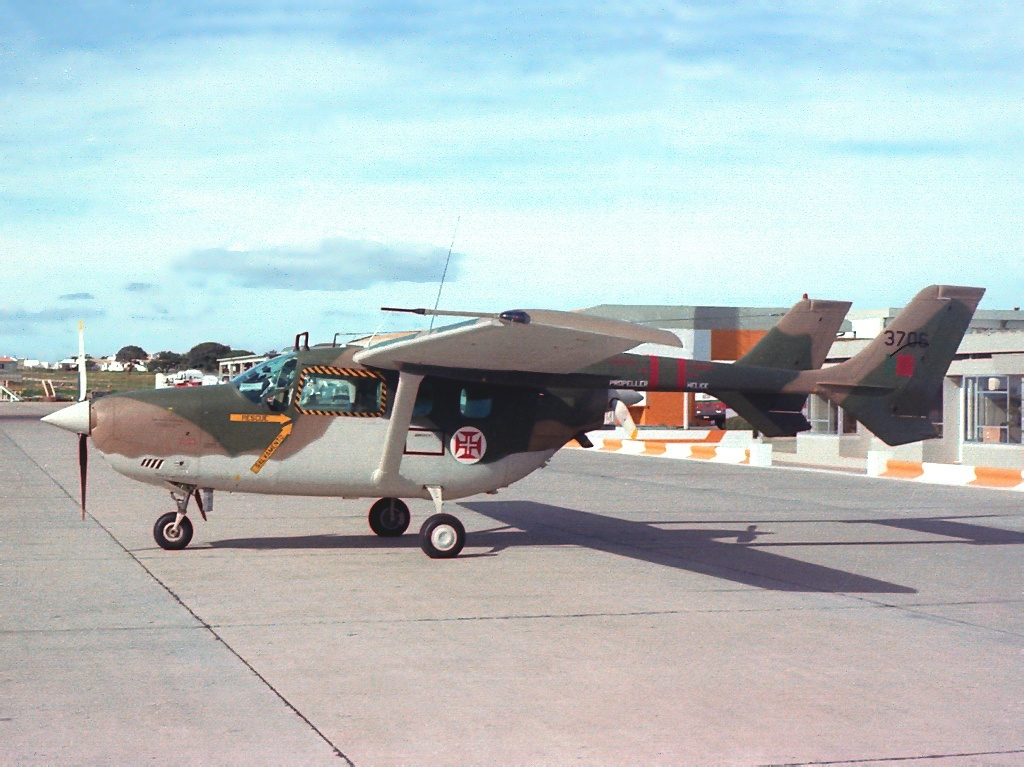
Former Reims-Cessna FTB-337 of the Portuguese Air Force

- Piper L-21 Super Cub (Portuguese Army, 1952–1957 and Portuguese Air Force, 1957–1976)
- Auster D.5/160 (Portuguese Air Force, 1961–1974)
- Dornier Do 27 (Portuguese Air Force, 1961–1979)
- Reims-Cessna FTB-337, (Portuguese Air Force, 1974–2007)

=== Soviet Union ===
- Polikarpov Po-2 Kukuruznik ("Crop Duster")

=== Sweden ===
- Piper PA-18-150 Super Cub as Flygplan 51, 1958–1974
- Dornier Do 27 as Flygplan 53, 1962–1991
- Scottish Aviation Bulldog as Flygplan 61C, 1972–1989

=== Switzerland ===
- Pilatus PC-6

=== United Kingdom ===
- de Havilland Dominie
- Westland Lysander
- Taylorcraft Auster AOP

== See also ==
- Liaison pilot
- Index of aviation articles
