= Zbysław Ciołkosz =

Polish American aircraft designer

Zbysław Ciołkosz (23 March 1902 – 25 June 1960) was a Polish American aircraft designer, whose work includes the P.Z.L. 27, PWS-20, LWS-3 Mewa, RWD-11, LWS-6 Żubr, PWS-1, PWS-54, PWS-19, LWS-2, and PWS-52. He was with PWS and LWS, but emigrated to America in 1948, where his work at Piasecki Helicopter earned him the Wright Brothers Medal in 1953 with D. N. Meyers for a paper discussing the use of shaft turbines for helicopters.
