= PWS-19 =

Polish reconnaissance and bomber plane prototype

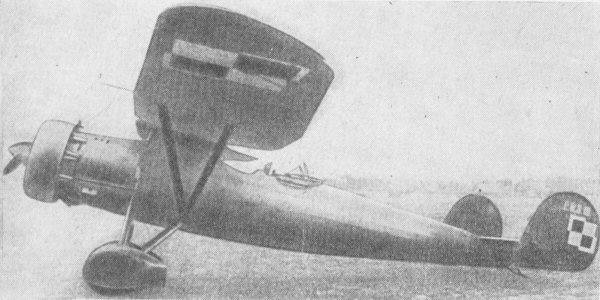

General information
- Type: Reconnaissance / bomber plane
- Manufacturer: PWS
- Status: Prototype
- Primary user: Polish Air Force
- Number built: 1

History
- First flight: September 1931

The PWS-19 was a Polish reconnaissance and bomber plane prototype of the 1930s, constructed in the PWS (Podlaska Wytwórnia Samolotów - Podlasie Aircraft Factory).

== Development ==
The PWS-19 was constructed in 1930 in order to replace the French-designed bombers Potez 25 and Breguet 19 in the Polish Air Force. It was a development of the PWS-17, which remained unbuilt. Main designers were Zbysław Ciołkosz and Antoni Uszacki. It was planned to be produced in two variants: reconnaissance PWS-19A2 and bomber PWS-19B2. It was a conventional design, a strutted high-wing monoplane with quite elegant silhouette, open cockpits and fixed landing gear. It was fitted with double tailfins to obtain a good field of defense fire.

In 1934 Antoni Uszacki designed a smaller plane basing on the PWS-19, designated PWS U-6, with G-1620 Mors 400 hp engine. It participated in a contest for an army cooperation plane, but lost against RWD-14 Czapla and was not built.

== Operational history ==
The only prototype first flew in Biała Podlaska in September 1931. During tests it showed quite good flight characteristics, although the rudders had to be enlarged to improve manoeuvrability and stability. However, on March 17, in 1933, the wings distorted in a dive and the prototype crashed (killing an observer). The Air Force considered ordering the PWS-19A2 powered by a Bristol Pegasus engine, but at the same time, a more modern aircraft the PZL.23 Karaś had been developed by PZL - a low-wing monoplane of all-metal construction. As a result, works upon the PWS-19 stopped.

== Description ==
Mixed construction high-wing (parasol) monoplane. A fuselage of a steel frame, covered with duralumin in front section and canvas in mid and rear sections. Two-spar wings, of wooden construction, plywood covered. Stabilizers, rudder and elevator of metal construction, canvas covered. Twin vertical tailfins. Crew of two (pilot and observer/gunner) in open individual cockpits. Conventional fixed landing gear, with a rear skid. The plane was fitted with RKL/D radio and camera.

Engine: 9 cylinder air-cooled radial Pratt & Whitney Hornet T2 in front, with a Townend ring (there were optional Bristol Jupiter VII or Bristol Pegasus). Two-blade metal propeller of a fixed pitch. Fuel tank 420 L in a fuselage, dropped in emergency.

Armament: single fixed front-mounted 7.7 mm Vickers machinegun with an interrupter gear, in the right fuselage side, single 7.7mm Vickers on a ring mounting of the observer. Up to 250 kg bombs (maximum bomb size - up to 50 kg).

== Operators ==
Poland

- Polish Air Force

== Specifications ==
Data from Polish Aircraft 1893–1939

General characteristics

- Crew: 2 (pilot, observer/gunner)
- Length: 9.05 m (29 ft 8 in)
- Wingspan: 14.5 m (47 ft 7 in)
- Height: 3.16 m (10 ft 4 in)
- Wing area: 29 m^{2} (310 sq ft)
- Empty weight: 1,340 kg (2,954 lb)
- Max takeoff weight: 2,160 kg (4,762 lb)
- Powerplant: 1 × Pratt & Whitney Hornet T2 9-cylinder air-cooled radial piston engine, 390 kW (520 hp) (nominal)
- Propellers: 2-bladed adjustable-pitch propeller

Performance

- Maximum speed: 255 km/h (158 mph, 138 kn) at sea level
- Range: 700 km (430 mi, 380 nmi)
- Service ceiling: 7,200 m (23,600 ft)
- Time to altitude: 17 min to 5,000 m (16,000 ft)

Armament

- Guns: 2 x 7.7 mm Vickers machine guns (1 forward-firing, 1 movable),
- Bombs: 250 kg (550 lb) bombs on racks under fuselage

== See also ==
Aircraft of comparable role, configuration, and era

- Letov S-328
- PZL.23 Karaś
