= Liaison pilot =

A liaison pilot was a World War II United States enlisted pilot, whose wings bore an "L" in the center. They flew light single engine liaison aircraft. Included were many enlisted aviation students who left basic combat training after having their first solo-flight and were given the opportunity to become liaison pilots. Flight training consisted of about 60 hours of flying time and stressed such procedures as short field landings and takeoffs over obstacles, low altitude navigation, first aid, day and night reconnaissance, aerial photography, and aircraft maintenance. Unarmed—except perhaps for a .45 pistol or .30 carbine—these men in 28 different squadrons flew low and slow with wheels, skis, or floats. They flew varied and often hazardous missions over nearly every battlefield—medical evacuation from forward areas; delivering munitions, blood plasma, mail, and other supplies to front lines; ferrying personnel; flying photographic or intelligence missions; serving as air observers for fighters or bombers; and other critical yet often unpublicized missions.

During the campaign to recapture the Philippines, pilots of the 25th Liaison Squadron flew a dozen Stinson L-5 Sentinel aircraft in short 30-minute flights (December 10–25, 1944) delivering supplies (including a 300-bed hospital) to the 6,000 men of the 11th Airborne Division isolated in the mountains of Leyte. In another mission, an Army officer wounded in the chest in New Guinea was evacuated in a liaison aircraft as the pilot pumped a portable respirator with one hand while he flew the aircraft with the other. In the northwestern U.S., some liaison pilots flew forest patrols (Project Firefly) watching for fires ignited by incendiary bombs carried across the Pacific beneath unmanned Japanese high altitude balloons.

== See also ==
- Index of aviation articles
