= PWS-1 =

Polish two-seat fighter and reconnaissance aircraft

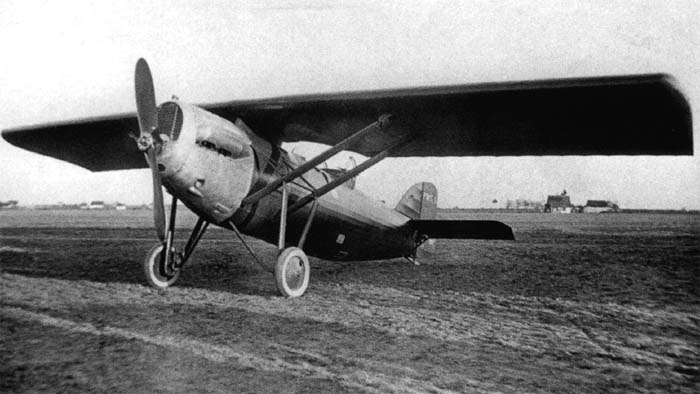
- PWS-1

General information
- Type: Fighter aircraft
- Manufacturer: Podlaska Wytwórnia Samolotów
- Designer: Zbysław Ciołkosz, Aleksander Grzędzielski
- Status: prototype
- Primary user: Polish Air Force
- Number built: 1

History
- First flight: 25 April 1927
- Retired: 1929

The PWS-1 was a Polish two-seat fighter and reconnaissance aircraft constructed by Podlaska Wytwórnia Samolotów (PWS) in 1927. It remained a prototype for its entire lifespan.

== Design and development ==
The PWS-1 was the first aircraft design produced by the Podlaska Wytwórnia Samolotów (Podlasie Aircraft Factory), and the second aircraft designed and built in Poland, after the CWL WZ-X. It was conceived as a single-engine high-wing two-seat fighter whose main purpose was to escort bombers. The design was produced in 1926 by Zbysław Ciołkosz and Aleksander Grzędzielski under the direction of Stanisław Cywiński.

After static testing, the prototype first flew on 25 April 1927 in Biała Podlaska. Although it had STOL capability, its maximum speed and maneuverability were low due to its thick wings.

In 1928, the aircraft was reworked, receiving a new lighter-weight, straight wing with a thinner profile and duralumin construction instead of a wooden, slightly swept one. It also received a large rectangular vertical stabilizer with a rounded top. After these modifications were made, the plane was again tested in early 1929 under the designation PWS-1bis. Its performance improved, but because of its relatively low speed compared to other fighters, its primary role was changed to reconnaissance. However, development was discontinued because the plane had a small payload and Poland had recently bought a large number of better Breguet 19 and Potez 25 reconnaissance and bomber aircraft.

== Description ==
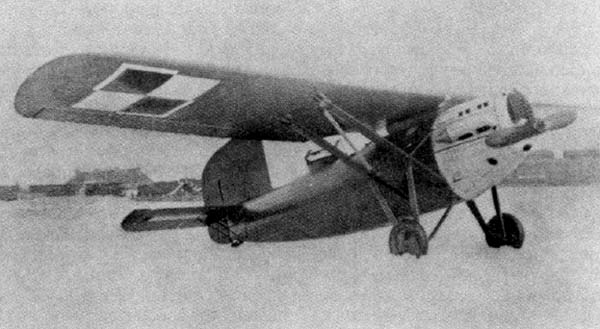
PWS-1bis

The PWS-1 was a high-wing parasol braced monoplane of mixed construction, featuring a single engine. It sported a fuselage with a steel frame in front and wooden frame in the rear covered with canvas and duralumin in the engine section. Its wing was slightly swept, two spar, and wooden, and was covered with plywood and canvas. The PWS-1bis had a straight, trapezoidal duralumin wing that was two-spar and also covered with plywood and canvas.

Both versions featured wooden stabilizers, rudders and elevators, all covered in canvas, and an open pilot's cab with a windshield. Behind the pilot's cab was an open observer's cab with two 7.7 mm Lewis machine guns on a ring mount. The two cabs featured twin controls. The pilot manned two 7.7 mm Vickers machine guns fixed in the fuselage through an interrupter gear. The plane featured a conventional fixed landing gear with a rear skid.

The PWS-1's engine was a Lorraine-Dietrich 12Eb water-cooled inline W-12 built in the Polish Skoda Works. The water radiator was located in front of the engine.

Acceleration was provided through a two-blade wooden propeller of a fixed pitch.

A 375-liter fuel tank was located in the front fuselage. It could be jettisoned in an emergency situation.

== Specifications (PWS 1bis) ==
Data from Jane's all the World's Aircraft 1928, Polish Aircraft 1893–1939

General characteristics

- Crew: 2
- Length: 8.375 m (27 ft 6 in)
- Wingspan: 12.65 m (41 ft 6 in)
- Height: 3.34 m (10 ft 11 in)
- Wing area: 30.5 m^{2} (328 sq ft)
- Airfoil: Bobek-Zdanewski No.4 (Göttingen 648)
- Empty weight: 1,445 kg (3,186 lb)
- Gross weight: 1,990 kg (4,387 lb)
- Fuel capacity: 375 L (99 US gal; 82 imp gal)
- Powerplant: 1 × Lorraine-Dietrich 12Eb W-12 water-cooled piston engine, 340 kW (450 hp)
- Propellers: 2-bladed wooden fixed pitch propeller

Performance

- Maximum speed: 232 km/h (144 mph, 125 kn) at sea level; 210 km/h (130 mph; 110 kn) at 5,000 m (16,000 ft)
- Landing speed:98 km/h (61 mph; 53 kn)
- Range: 750 km (470 mi, 400 nmi)
- Service ceiling: 6,000 m (20,000 ft) at normal weight
- Rate of climb: 5.4 m/s (1,060 ft/min)
- Time to altitude: 1,000 m (3,300 ft) in 3 minutes 25 seconds; 3,000 m (9,800 ft) in 13 minutes
- Wing loading: 65.4 kg/m^{2} (13.4 lb/sq ft)
- Power/mass: 0.1031 hp/lb (0.1695 kW/kg)

Armament
2 x fixed forward firing synchronised 7.7 mm (0.303 in) Vickers machine guns; 2 x flexibly mounted 7.7 mm (0.303 in) Lewis machine guns in the rear cockpit
