= Kaproni Bulgarski KB-11 Fazan =

Bulgarian plane

KB-11 Fazan
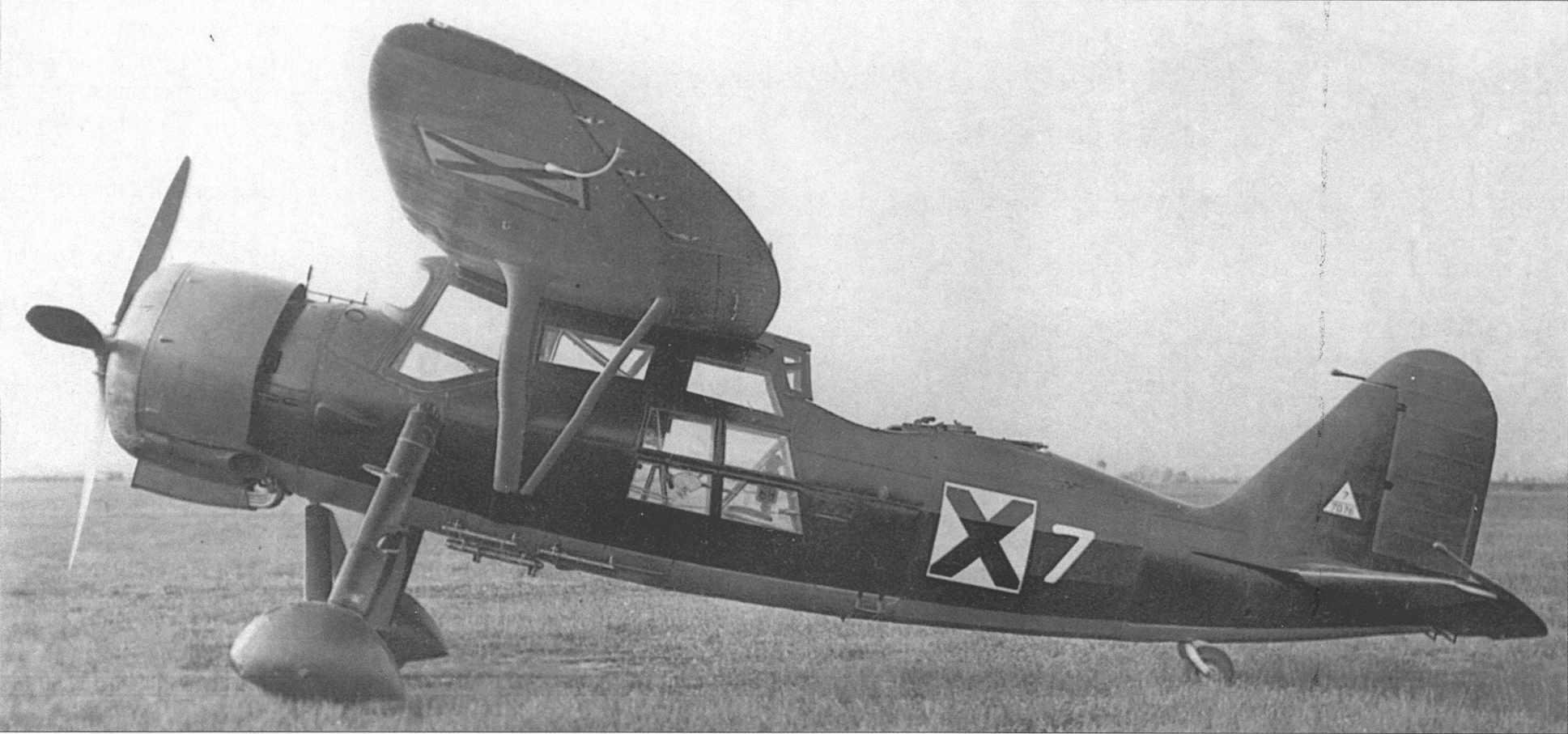

General information
- Type: Army liaison monoplane
- National origin: Bulgaria
- Manufacturer: Kaproni Bulgarski
- Primary user: Bulgarian Air Force Yugoslav Air Force (postwar)

History
- Introduction date: 1942
- First flight: 1941
- Retired: 1958 (Yugoslavia)

The Kaproni Bulgarski KB-11 Fazan (English: Pheasant) was a 1940s Bulgarian army liaison and utility monoplane built by Kaproni Bulgarski, a subsidiary of the Italian aviation conglomerate Società Italiana Caproni.

== Development and design ==
The prototype Fazan flew in 1941 as a shoulder-wing monoplane powered by a 750 hp (559 kW) Alfa Romeo 126 R.C.34 radial engine. It had a fixed conventional landing gear with a tailwheel. Flight testing of the prototype showed that the aircraft was unstable and was nose-heavy in level flight, and was considered unsafe during forced-landings. By analogy with the Hunchback of Notre-Dame, the prototype gaining the unflattering nickname "Quasimodo".

The second prototype was redesigned with a high-wing, a revised undercarriage and new cockpit glazing, while retaining the engine and three-bladed fixed-pitch propeller of the first prototype. The revised aircraft successfully passed its flight trials, and a small batch of six similar aircraft, designated KB-11-I, followed. While this batch was being built, a further-revised version was produced, the KB-11-II. This took advantage of the availability of large quantities of PZL-license built Bristol Pegasus engines that had been captured by the Germans during the Invasion of Poland, with a Pegasus XXI driving a two-bladed wooden propeller replacing the Alfa-Romeo, while the fuselage glazing was changed again. This revised aircraft was renamed Fazan, and was followed by 43 production aircraft.

== Operational history ==
The KB-11 was used to replace Letov Š-328s and PZL.43 in the short-range reconnaissance squadrons of the Bulgarian Air Force, equipping four squadrons. Fazans were used in joint Bulgarian-German-Italian operations against Tito's Partisans in Serbia from 1943. Following Bulgaria's armistice with the Soviet Union and declaration of war against Germany in September 1944, the Bulgarian Air Force was used in support of Bulgarian Army forces in Serbia and Macedonia who were fighting against their former allies. KB-11 equipped units saw only limited use in this offensive, possibly because of the aircraft's similarity to the German Henschel Hs 126.

In 1947, 30 KB-11s were transferred to Yugoslavia as part of war reparations following the Paris Peace Treaties. They were used as trainers, liaison aircraft and target tugs. The wooden wings were replaced by metal wings by Ikarus, allowing the KB-11 to continue in service in Yugoslavia until 1958.

== Operators ==
Bulgaria

- Bulgarian Air Force

Yugoslavia

- SFR Yugoslav Air Force

== Specifications ==
Data from Letadla 39–45: SFKB KB-11 Fazan

General characteristics

- Crew: 2 (pilot, observer/gunner)
- Length: 9.20 m (30 ft 2 in)
- Wingspan: 12.80 m (42 ft 0 in)
- Height: 3.80 m (12 ft 6 in)
- Wing area: 25.23 m^{2} (271.6 sq ft)
- Gross weight: 1,089 kg (2,400 lb)
- Powerplant: 1 × PZL Pegasus XXI radial, 690 kW (930 hp)
- Propellers: 2-bladed

Performance

- Maximum speed: 390 km/h (240 mph, 210 kn)
- Cruise speed: 320 km/h (200 mph, 170 kn)
- Range: 800 km (500 mi, 430 nmi)
- Service ceiling: 8,000 m (26,000 ft)

Armament

- Guns: 2 × 7.92mm Zbrojovka M-30 machine guns in nose and two at observer's station
- Bombs: 2 × 100kg bombs or six smaller bombs

== See also ==
Aircraft of comparable role, configuration, and era

- Fiesler Fi 156
- Westland Lysander
