= RWD-14 Czapla =

Polish army cooperation aircraft

RWD-14b Czapla
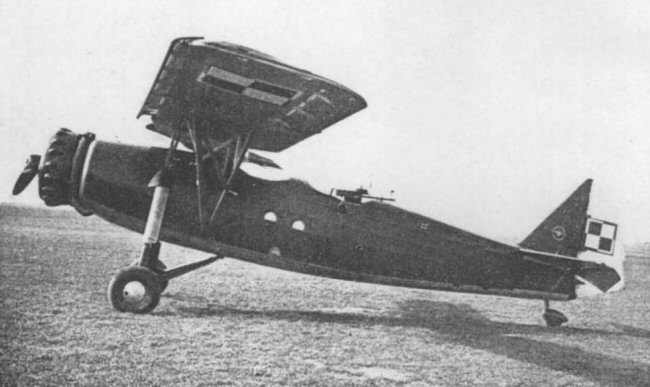

General information
- Type: reconnaissance and liaison aircraft
- Manufacturer: DWL, LWS
- Primary users: Polish Air Force Romanian Air Force
- Number built: 65 (+4 prototypes)

History
- Manufactured: 1938–1939
- Introduction date: 1939
- First flight: 1936

The RWD-14 Czapla (LWS Czapla) was a Polish army cooperation aircraft (observation, close reconnaissance and liaison aircraft), designed in the mid-1930s by the RWD team, and produced in the LWS factory from 1938. A series of 65 aircraft were built and most were used by the Polish Air Force observation squadrons during World War II in 1939.

== Design and development ==
The aircraft was designed in response to a Polish Air Force requirement of 1933 for a new army cooperation plane, a successor of the Lublin R-XIII. The RWD team of the DWL workshops (Doświadczalne Warsztaty Lotnicze) initially proposed the RWD-12 project, based on the RWD-8 trainer. It was however considered as not as good as the R-XIII, and was not built. Another aircraft, the RWD-14 was designed by Stanislaw Rogalski and Jerzy Drzewiecki instead. Designer Tadeusz Chyliński prepared its technical documentation.

The first prototype was flown in early 1936 (according to newest research, earlier given date December 1935 is wrong). It won the contest over the Lublin R-XXI project and the PWS factory project, but factory trials showed that its performance was still not satisfactory. In 1937 two modified prototypes were built, designated RWD-14a, but both crashed during trials that year due to steering mechanism faults (the pilots survived). Finally, in early 1938 the fourth improved prototype, designated RWD-14b, was built. After successful trials it was ordered by the Polish Air Force, receiving the name Czapla (Polish: heron), but due to a long development process, it was regarded as only an interim model, to replace the R-XIII until the advent of the more modern LWS-3 Mewa. In return for refunding the development costs, the DWL gave the rights to produce the RWD-14b to the state factory LWS (Lubelska Wytwórnia Samolotów – Lublin Aircraft Works, a successor of the Plage i Laśkiewicz).

The LWS built a series of 65 RWD-14b Czapla by February 1939. They were also known under a military designation LWS Czapla.

== Operational history ==
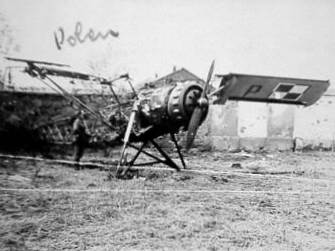
A wrecked RWD-14b in September 1939

The Czapla entered service in the Polish Air Force in the spring of 1939, equipping some observation squadrons (eskadra obserwacyjna). Due to its long development, it was not a modern aircraft, only a little better than the Lublin R-XIII. Its advantage was its short take-off (140 m) and landing (120 m), enabling it to operate from fields and meadows. Its modern successor, the LWS-3 Mewa, did not manage to enter operational units due to the war.

By the invasion of Poland in 1939, the Polish Air Force had 35 Czaplas in five observation squadrons (out of twelve): No.'s 13, 23, 33, 53 and 63, each with seven aircraft. Squadrons were distributed among the field Armies. The remaining 30 Czaplas were initially in reserve. Several were used to supplement the combat units during the campaign (the mentioned squadrons and several others). In total, 49 Czaplas were used in units. Like the R-XIII, the Czapla was no match for any Luftwaffe fighter, bomber, or even reconnaissance aircraft, being much slower, and armed with only two machine guns. In spite of this, they were actively used for close reconnaissance and liaison tasks.

Most – 35 RWD-14b were destroyed during the campaign. At least 14 were withdrawn to Romania (the sources quote numbers from 14 to 17). They were taken over by the Romanian Air Force and used for training and auxiliary duties. Several aircraft were captured in Poland by the Germans or the Soviets, but were not used by them. No RWD-14b has survived.

== Technical description ==
Mixed construction braced parasol high-wing monoplane, conventional in layout. A fuselage of a metal and wooden frame, covered with canvas. Wooden two-spar wings, canvas- and plywood-covered, fitted with slats. Wings were folding rearwards (width with folded wings: 3.9 m). Stabilizers of wooden construction. Conventional fixed landing gear, with a rear wheel. Crew of two, sitting in tandem in open cockpits, with twin controls and individual windshields. The observer had a 7.7 mm Vickers K machine gun, the pilot had a fixed 7.92 mm wz.33 machine gun with an interrupter gear. 9-cylinder air-cooled radial engine PZL G-1620B Mors-II with 430 hp (320 kW) nominal power and 470 hp (350 kW) take-off power. Two-blade wooden propeller. A fuel tank with a capacity of 315 litres in the fuselage, dropped in emergency. The aircraft could be fitted with radio N2L/T and camera.

== Operators ==
Poland

- Polish Air Force

Romania

- Royal Romanian Air Force

== Specifications (RWD-14b) ==
Data from Polish Aircraft 1893–1939

General characteristics

- Crew: 2
- Capacity: 475 kg (1,047.2 lb) useful load
- Length: 9 m (29 ft 6 in)
- Wingspan: 11.9 m (39 ft 1 in)
- Height: 3 m (9 ft 10 in)
- Wing area: 22 m^{2} (240 sq ft)
- Empty weight: 1,225 kg (2,701 lb)
- Gross weight: 1,700 kg (3,748 lb)
- Powerplant: 1 × PZL G-1620B Mors-II 9-cylinder air-cooled radial piston engine, 350 kW (470 hp) at 2,375 rpm for take-off

430 hp (321 kW) at 2,150 rpm at sea level

- Propellers: 2-bladed Szomański fixed-pitch propeller

Performance

- Maximum speed: 247 km/h (153 mph, 133 kn)
- Cruise speed: 232 km/h (144 mph, 125 kn)
- Stall speed: 80 km/h (50 mph, 43 kn) ca
- Range: 675 km (419 mi, 364 nmi)
- Service ceiling: 5,100 m (16,700 ft)
- Rate of climb: 6.1 m/s (1,200 ft/min)
- Wing loading: 77 kg/m^{2} (16 lb/sq ft)

Armament

- 1 × fixed, forward-firing 7.92 mm wz.33 machine gun
- 1 × flexible, rearward-firing 7.7 mm Vickers K machine gun for observer

== See also ==
Aircraft of comparable role, configuration, and era

- Heinkel He 46
- Henschel Hs 126
- Breguet 270
- Potez 390
