= Army cooperation aircraft =

Inter-war multi-role military aircraft

The army cooperation aircraft was an inter-war concept of an aircraft capable of support of ground units in a variety of roles. Army cooperation planes combined the roles of artillery spotter aircraft, liaison, reconnaissance plane and close air support.

== Details ==
The concept of army cooperation units was invented in France at the end of World War I. Numerous countries experimented with the idea of creating separate units tasked with close cooperation with ground units. However, in most cases the roles of observation, reconnaissance and liaison were kept separate, with each assigned to a more specialised unit. One of the few countries to actually implement the idea was Poland. By the end of the 1930s the Polish Army had 12 escadrilles of "assisting aircraft", usually operating as platoons of 3 to 6 aircraft attached to regiments of infantry or cavalry. Typical Polish army cooperation planes included Lublin R-XIII, PZL Ł.2 and RWD-14 Czapla. According to Polish specifications of the late 1920s, the army cooperation aircraft were capable of STOL, had folding wings and relatively small dimensions to allow them to operate from improvised airfields and improvised hangars such as barns. The folding wings also allowed for the plane to be towed by a car or truck, which was essential for the planes to operate in cooperation with the land units.

== See also ==
- Index of aviation articles
- Counter-insurgency aircraft
- Light Attack/Armed Reconnaissance
