= Tadeusz Chyliński =

Polish airplane designer and constructor

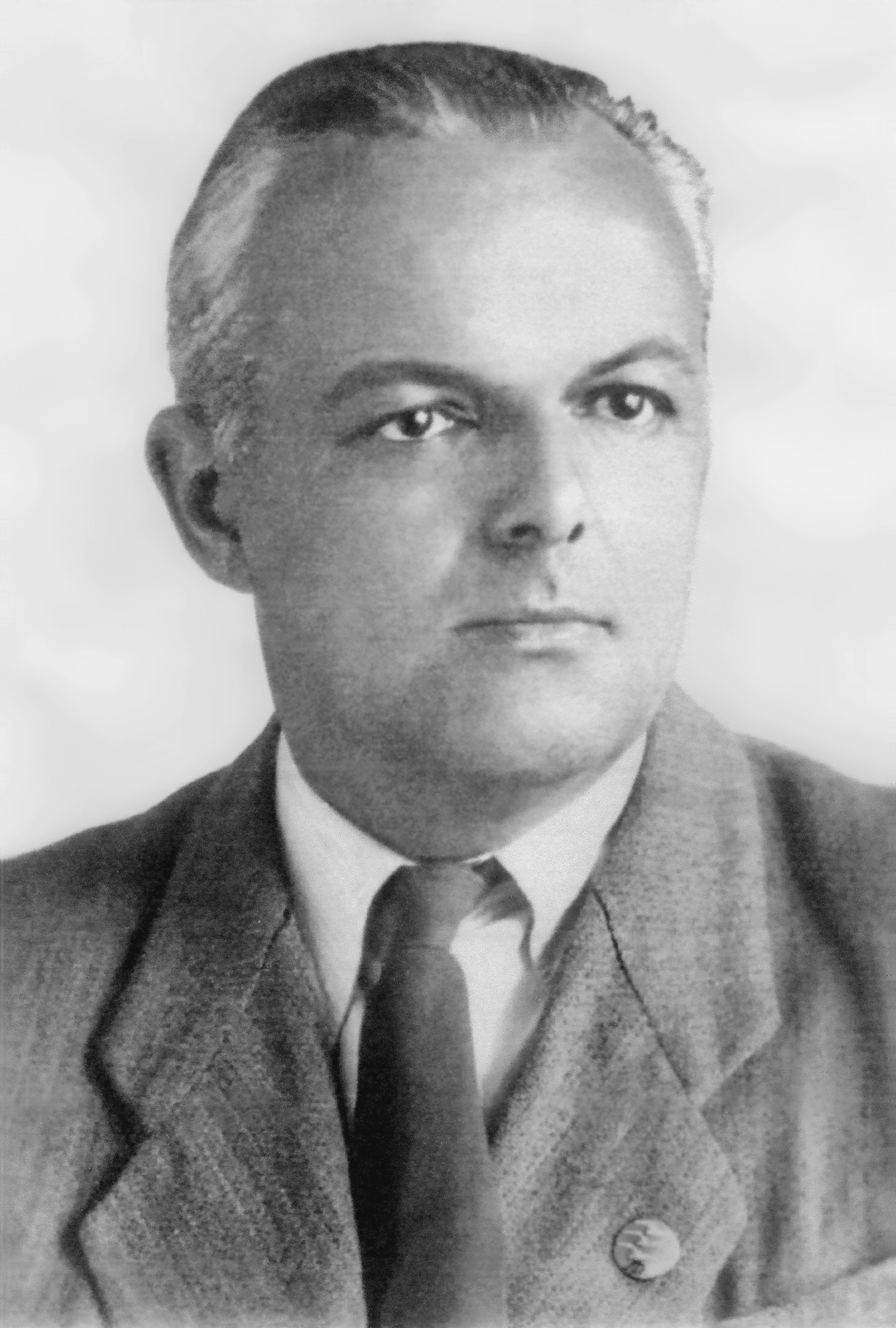
Tadeusz Chyliński

Tadeusz Chylińnski (13 October 1911 in Warsaw – 15 February 1978 in Warsaw) – was a Polish airplane designer and constructor, a researcher at the Institute of Aviation in Warsaw and specialist in aircraft structures.

== Before World War II ==
Chyliński was the son of Stanisław Kazimierz and Zofia J. née Tuszowski. In 1920, went to the Muszyński School in Warsaw. After a year he moved to Milanówek (suburb of Warsaw), where his parents bought the "Afrykanka" (literally: African woman) estate, and where he attended the coeducational Classical High School.

In 1926, he returned to Warsaw to continue his education in the school of Ludwik Lorentz "Lorencowka", from which he graduated in 1930. He began studies at the University of Warsaw, but in 1931 he moved to the Mechanical Division of the Warsaw University of Technology and its aeronautical school. During his studies, he obtained a glider pilot license in Sokola Góra near Krzemieniec. He practiced in Yugoslavia as well. At the same time, he obtained a Bachelor's degree in the Aeronautical Section of Warsaw Tech's Mechanical Department.

During the years 1936-1937, he passed his military training in the pre-officer school of Artillery in Wlodzimierz Wolynski, 5th battery, obtaining the grade of Cadet Second Class with Diploma of Artillery.

In 1937, he began to work at the Experimental Aeronautical Workshops (Doświadczalne Warsztaty Lotnicze) RWD at the Okęcie airport in Warsaw as an aircraft constructor, continuing his studies in the same time. In the fall of that year he married Alina Dabkowska. He prepared at that time the technical documentation of the reconnaissance plane RWD-14 Czapla.

In 1938, he began, along with Jerzy Drzewiecki, design work on the high-performance experimental airplane RWD-19, for which Chyliński constructed its wings. By October 1938 the aircraft had undergone flight tests. His next projects comprised the following projects: fuselage of the auxiliary-use aircraft RWD-18, base mount for the engine of the trainer RWD-23, and the wing longeron for the fighter RWD-25. Chyliński was responsible for working on construction and documentation for these planes. From 1933 to 1938, he was a member of the Avionic Section of the Mechanical Circle of the Warsaw Technical University Students.

== World War II ==
In 1939, he was drafted into the Army, and served first in the 5th Light Artillery Regiment (PAL) in Toruń, next in the 8th PAL of Płock, where he defended his country during the German invasion of Poland in the Battle of Bzura, and then staffed the Modlin Fortress. When the fortress was overrun on September 29, 1939, he was taken prisoner of war and placed in the Działdowo prisoner's camp, from which, after several days, per the capitulation agreement, he was released. He returned to Warsaw changing his name and address in order to safely join the Polish resistance.

From January 1940 he was employed by the local Electric Transit Authority (EKD) as a conductor and motorman; then, as a technician in the Division of Track. He worked for this company until August 1944. However, from November 1942, he was also a member of the Polish Home Army (Armia Krajowa) in its diversionary division named "Wachlarz". Operating under nom de guerre that included "Aga" and "Dzięcioł". Among his covert activities, he constructed railroad mines. He survived the Warsaw Uprising and its outcome by absconding from a German military convoy transporting Poles, returning to live in Milanówek. This was his residence until 1966. Also in the years 1942-1944 that predated the Warsaw Uprising, he carried on a secret production and distribution of soap, which in addition to providing financial relief for the participants, was done in order to accrue the capital and production means to restart a modest aviation factory come the war end. This was done jointly in an informal co-op with fellow aviation engineer Roman Berkowski and aviation designer Bronisław Żurkowski.

== After the war ==
The aforementioned effort to restart the private production of airplanes could not be realized in Communist Poland. The machine tools and accrued tools and measuring instruments ended being taken over and then sold at auction by the government. Meanwhile, In 1945, for the Ministry of Communications, he projected the construction of the high voltage line between Otwock and Miłosna suburbs. During 1945 and 1946, Chyliński took part in an open competition of the Civil Aviation Department for developing a training glider, in which he won the first prize with his project of a motor glider, the HWL Pegaz.

From 1946 to 1947 Chyliński together with designer Bronisław Żurakowski, per agreement with Poland's Department of Civil Aviation (Departament Lotnictwa Cywilnego), developed the construction plans for the "Pegaz". At the same time, he was working with the Aviation Department Headquarters of the Polish Scouting and Guiding Association (Związek Harcerstwa Polskiego). The design team also included the technicians Waszkiewicz and Brewiński. The engine for the "Pegaz" was designed by Stefan Gajęcki. The motor glider was flown on July 16, 1949, piloted by Bronisław Żurawski and Jerzy Szymankiewicz. At first, the plan was to build 80 "Pegazes" for the flying clubs. However, it never was put into production, despite the fact that it passed the national approval test with a very good rating. The main reason for this was the order from the USSR to stop work on any national aviation project.

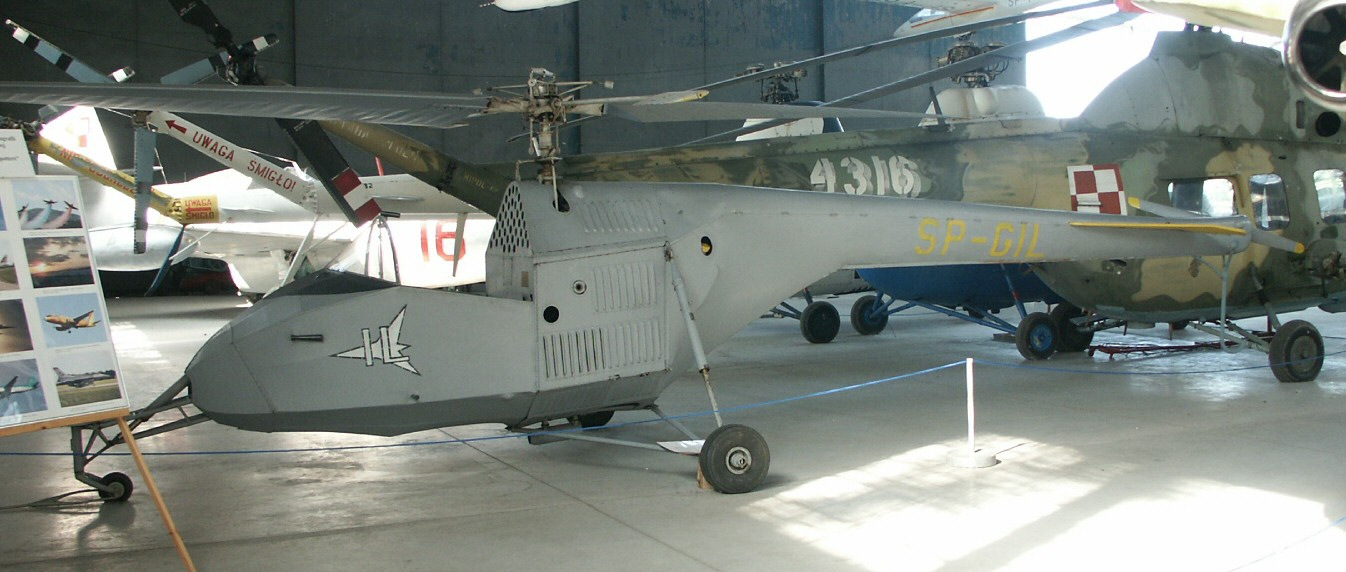
Polish experimental helicopter BŻ-1 GIL in the Polish Aviation Museum in Kraków

In January 1948, Tadeusz Chyliński began work at the Technical Institute of Aviation (Instytut Techniczny Lotnictwa), renamed on April 1 of that same year as the National Aviation Institute (Główny Instytut Lotnictwa). From March 3, 1952, together with Zbigniew Brzoski, he worked as a designer at the Aviation Institute in the Department of Materials Science and Construction. There, he designed the fuselage, landing gear and tail rotor for the first Polish helicopter, the BŻ-1 GIL, whose main designer was the engineer Bronisław Żurakowski. In 1949 under the direction of Chyliński, the extensometer studies of the span of the Poniatowski bridge in Warsaw were completed. In 1951, he conducted these same studies on other bridge spans including on the Wisła in Knybawa and the intensity of stress on line insulators with high tension.

In 1950, he reworked the Piper Cub airplane and made it into an ambulance airplane. The prototype was built at the Aviation Institute, and 14 of them were produced at the District Aviation Workshop No. 4 in Gdańsk. In the early 1950s, he designed target drones with pulsating propulsion TC1 and TC2 and in 1955, the towing drones Spec-3 and Spec-4 which were tested that same year.

On 1 June 1951 he became the head of the Department of Material's Strength & Construction at the Polish National Aviation Institute in Warsaw. In February 1961, he graduated from Warsaw University of Technology (Politechnika Warszawska) and was awarded a master's degree in Aviation Engineering.

During the years 1954-1956, he managed the Department of Airframe, and from 1956 until 1965-12-15, was the head of the Strength Department of the Aviation Institute further developing their labs and creating a new system of testing the strength of aviation equipment. In 1957, he developed, along with designers Justyn Sandauer and J. Harazny, an introductory project of a training airplane "As" as the comparative to the PZL TS-11 Iskra.

From March 18, 1957 he was a member of the board of directors of the Aviation Institute and from February 1959 a member of the College of the Institute. Under his leadership, the main specialists of the strength of aircraft structures of the Aviation Institute were educated. All airplanes, helicopters, and wind gliders for the aviation business built during the 1950s and 60s in the 20th century were checked and tested under his directions.

From 1948 until 1952, these were tests of strength of construction for aviation equipment such as CSS-10, CSS-11, CSS-12, LWD Junak 2, as well as elements of the helicopter BŻ-1 GIL and gliders Sęp, Jastrząb, and Jaskółka. From 1952 to 1961 the strength tests of jet aircraft: Lim-1 (licence-built MiG-15), Lim-2 (MiG-15bis), Lim-5 (MiG-17), and TS-11 "Iskra" as well as piston aircraft: CSS-13, Junak-3, Li-2, TS-8 Bies, Jak-12M, Jak-12A, PZL M-2, also elements of the helicopter BŻ-4 Żuk. By this time, Chyliński was a director of the Department of Materials Strength.

From 1962 until 1965, he was testing the strength of the airplane PZL-104 Wilga, gliders Kobuz, Foka, and Kormoran and also diesel engine shafts and underwater airfoil of the hydrofoil craft "Gryf". Furthermore, under his directions endurance tests were conducted of the wings of the glider "Mucha-100", the ferruling of the wings on the PZL MD-12, shafts and connecting rods of the airplane engine WN3 and the grinder of the rotor blade of the helicopter SM-1 (Mil Mi-1). In March 1956, his project "Kawka" received recognition in the contest sponsored by the League of Soldiers Friends (LPZ) for a single-person training glider.

On 1960-11-21, he was asked by the Minister of Transportation to fill the position of the head of the Commission of Civil Flight Regulations at the Department of Civil Aviation of the Ministry of Transportation. In 1962, he took part in taking the "Vickers Viscount" planes from England into service with LOT Polish Airlines. On 1964-01-01, he was offered the position of an independent researcher, while working at the director of the Center of Special Constructions (for example, rockets) and the director of the Problem Group.

In 1964, he created an introductory project of a 12-location multifunction, short take-off and landing airplane, TC-Borsuk that was powered by two turboprop engines (as the follower Antonov An-2 and a similar class that was put into production in the 1970s licensed Russian An-28) and in 1969 he modified the An-2 by increasing the area of the nose to improve lifting capacity and make it more economical (the An-2 was also powered by turboprop engines). From 1972-10-01, he worked at the Research Center for Airframes and Materials Strength of the Aviation Institute as an independent researcher and from 1973 as an assistant professor (docent).

== Awards and publications ==
For his work in aviation, he received the Knight's Cross of The Order of Polonia Restituta and other high national honors. He published many articles about aviation technology in "Skrzydlata Polska", "Technika Lotnicza i Astronautyczna" and in the information bulletin of the Aviation Institute.

== Family ==
He has two children, Lidia Chylińska and Rafał. He died in Warsaw and is buried at the Powązki Cemetery, lot No. 325. s. 20-22.
