= HWL Pegaz =

Pegaz
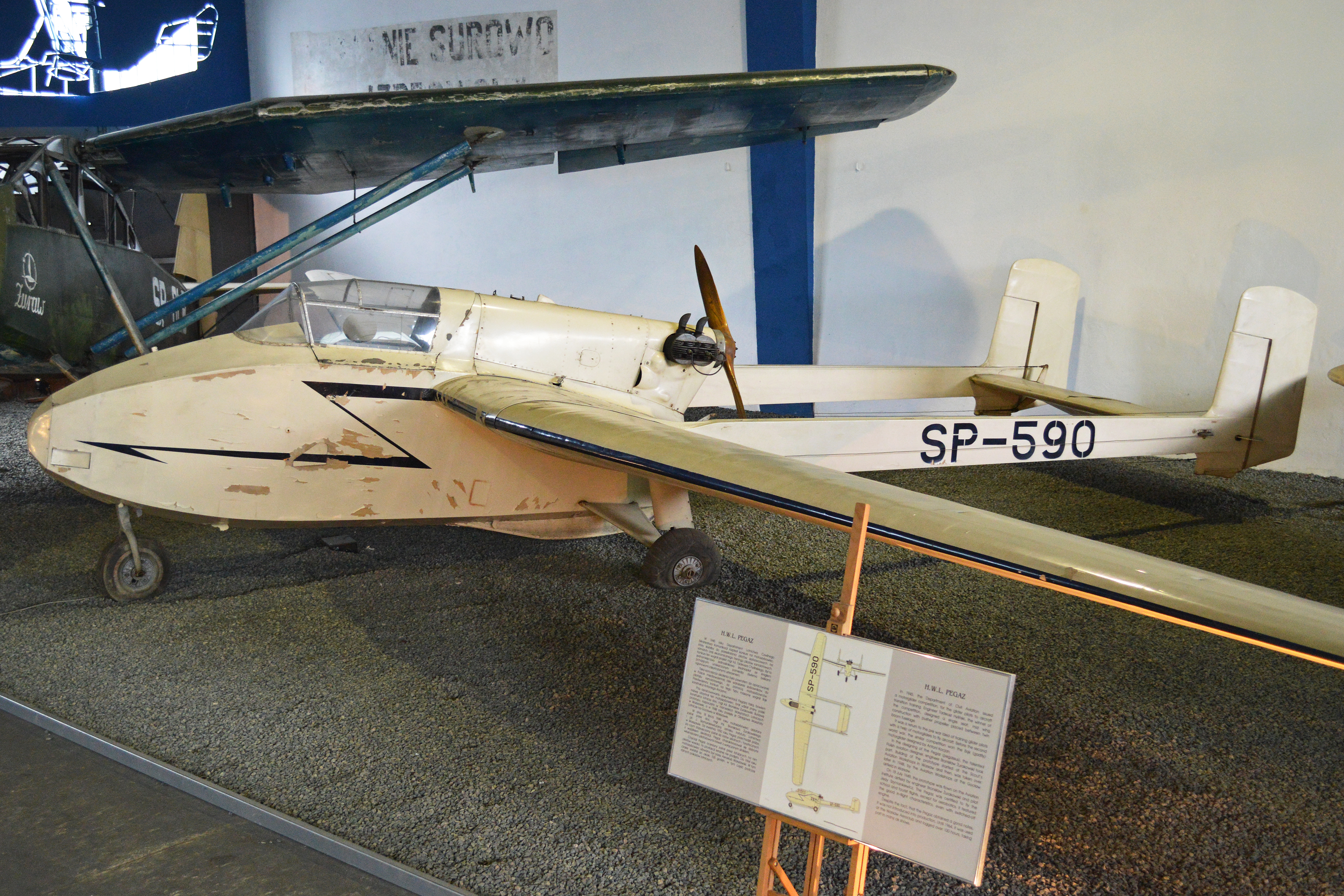
- HWL Pegaz in the Polish Aviation Museum

General information
- Type: Motor glider
- National origin: Poland
- Manufacturer: Warsaw's Goclaw Aircraft Plant 6
- Designer: Tadeusz Chyliński
- Status: at Polish Aviation Museum in Kraków
- Primary user: Warsaw Aviation Club
- Number built: 1

History
- Manufactured: 1947-1948
- First flight: 16 July 1949
- Retired: 1964

The HWL Pegaz was the first Polish post-war motor glider, a single-seat mid-wing monoplane with a pusher propeller and twin tail boom, which was designed and constructed by Tadeusz Chyliński and was built in Warsaw-Goclaw Aircraft Plant 6.

== Design and development ==
During 1945 and 1946, Tadeusz Chyliński took part in a competition of the Civil Aviation Department for developing a training motor glider. He won first prize for his project, the HWL Pegaz motor glider. From 1946 to 1947, Tadeusz Chyliński based on an agreement with the Department of Civil Aviation (Departament Lotnictwa Cywilnego) with the help of Bronisław Żurakowski, developed the construction plans for the "Pegaz".

The motor glider was designed to train class "C" glider pilots in stand-alone (without dual-controls) motor piloting, as well as for training and pursuing aeronautic sports in inexpensive aircraft. The engine for the "Pegaz" was designed by Stefan Gajecki, who was well known for designing skimming boat motors. Construction began on the "Pegaz" at the HWL (Harcerskie Warsztaty Lotnicze - Scouts' Aircraft Works) in Warsaw. In 1948, the work was taken over by Warsaw's Gocław Aircraft Plant 6. The motor glider (one for flying and two unassembled) was finished in spring of 1948. The engineless plane was on display at the Aviation Day in 1948. "Pegaz" was test-flown on July 16, 1949, piloted by Bronisław Żurakowski and Jerzy Szymankiewicz. The factory and certification test were conducted at the National Aviation Institute in Warsaw and completed in May 1950. "Pegaz" was in three air shows on Aviation Day in 1949, 50, 51.

At first, the plan was to build 80 "Pegaz" planes for various flying clubs. "Pegaz" passed the National Approval Test with a very good rating, however it was never put into production. There was the order from the USSR to stop work on national aviation projects. The "Pegaz" was assigned the registration number SP-590 and was given to the Warsaw Aviation Club to use, piloted by many glider pilots. It has been on display at Polish Aviation Museum in Kraków since August 1964.

== Design specifications ==
- Characteristic: dual-boom monoplane with pusher propeller, three-wheel landing gear with forward steerable wheel, all wood construction.
- The fuselage is composed of a laminated-wood-sheathed pod containing an enclosed cabin, the engine and two lateral laminated-wood-sheathed boom joining the wing with the directional and diving rudder. The fuselage pod is hexagonal. The instrument panel is fitted with an airspeed indicator, altimeter and vertical speed indicator, a magnetic compass, turn indicator, ignition switch and fuel pump. The cabin also features an air throttle valve and decompressor, a fuel gauge and fuel valve. The motor glider is steered by a stick and rudder bar. The pilot's seat is made to accommodate a backpack parachute.
- The wooden cantilever wing is sheathed in laminated wood and canvas. The wing is a right-angle trapezoid with rounded tips and has three structural sections: a central section and two removable outer sections joined to the central section by three pins. The dual-spar central section is unitized with the fuselage pod and tail booms. The removable monospar outer sections have an oblique auxiliary spar. The canvas-sheathed slotted ailerons are aerodynamically-compensated, differentially displaced 30° upward and 18° downward. The wing has a fixed slot at the edge of attack.
- The twin vertical tail is located at the boom tips. The elevator unit is located between them. The monospar fins are sheathed in laminated wood. The control surfaces on the wooden frame are canvas-sheathed.
- The three-wheel landing gear has a forward steerable wheel. The main landing gear is tri-strutted with rubber-string shock absorbers. The wheel tires are low-pressured. The aft of the fuselage pod between the wheels is protected against major deflection of the landing gear by an ashwood skin with an inner-tube shock absorber.
- The motor glider is powered by an XL-GAD prototype engine. It is a four-cylinder flat two-cycle air-cooled engine. Two cylinders have a decompressor to facilitate startup. The wooden pusher propeller has a fixed pitch and diameter of 1.42 meters. The 30-liter fuel tank is located to the fore of the engine.
- Paint - The "Pegaz" was painted a cream color. The wing's edge of attack, registration number and fuselage arrow were painted navy blue.

== Features ==
The "Pegaz" proved to be very safe and easy to pilot during testing and operation. It was stable in every axis with the controls released. By stalling and releasing the stick with the engine running, the motor glider was able to make about decreasing changes in velocity, going into a fixed climb rate of 1.5 m/s with a trajectoryspeed of 90 km/h. Also by stalling and releasing the stick with the engine throttled, the velocity amplitude changed two to three times, after which the aircraft went into a fixed glide at a speed of 110 km/h and a descent rate of 2.0 m/s. When stalled with the rudder released, the motor glider displayed no tendency to spin. It was hard to get the "Pegaz" to go into a tailspin. The speed necessary to go into a tailspin was 55 km/h, with an altitude loss at one spin of 75 meters. Landing speed was 130 km/h. The motor glider performed acrobatic figures with a gravity load range up to 4 g. It could do loops at a speed of 125 km/h without losing altitude and ended loops with the same speed. The "Pegaz" behaved totally normal in dives at 210 km/h.

== Operators ==
Poland

- Aeroklub Warszawski operated one aircraft in Warsaw.

== Surviving aircraft ==
The HWL Pegaz (SP-590) is preserved in the Polish Aviation Museum in Kraków, from 1964

== Specifications ==
Data from Motorsegler Pegaz

General characteristics

- Crew: 1
- Length: 6.85 m (22 ft 6 in)
- Wingspan: 11.7 m (38 ft 5 in)
- Height: 1.6 m (5 ft 3 in)
- Wing area: 14.8 m^{2} (159 sq ft)
- Aspect ratio: 9.2
- Empty weight: 270 kg (595 lb)
- Gross weight: 397 kg (875 lb)
- Max takeoff weight: 390 kg (860 lb)
- Powerplant: 1 × Gajęcki XL-Gad 4-cylinder air-cooled horizontally-opposed two-stroke piston engine, 23 kW (31 hp) (designed by Dipl. Ing. Stefan Gajęcki)
- Propellers: 2-bladed fixed-pitch pusher propeller

Performance

- Maximum speed: 129 km/h (80 mph, 70 kn)
- Cruise speed: 110 km/h (68 mph, 59 kn)
- Stall speed: 59 km/h (37 mph, 32 kn)
- Never exceed speed: 210 km/h (130 mph, 110 kn)
- Landing speed: 59 km/h (37 mph; 32 kn)
- Range: 275 km (171 mi, 148 nmi)
- Service ceiling: 3,000 m (9,800 ft)
- g limits: +4g
- Maximum glide ratio: 15.5
- Rate of climb: 2 m/s (390 ft/min) engine on, still air
- Rate of sink: 1.25 m/s (246 ft/min)
