= Żurakowski =

Żurakowski is a Polish surname. Notable people with the surname include:

- Bronisław Żurakowski (1911–2009), Polish aerospace engineer and aviator
- Janusz Żurakowski (1914–2004), Polish fighter and test pilot
