= WSK WN-3 =

WN-3
- Narkiewicz WN-3 at the Polish Aviation Museum in Kraków.
- Type: Radial engine
- National origin: Poland
- Manufacturer: WSK-Kalisz
- Designer: Wiktor Narkiewicz
- Major applications: PZL TS-8 Bies
- Manufactured: 1957–1960

The WN-3 was a Polish seven-cylinder air-cooled radial engine of the 1950s, produced by WSK-Kalisz, designed by Wiktor Narkiewicz.

== Design and development ==
In 1946, Wiktor Narkiewicz, who prior to the Second World War was technical director of the Czechoslovak Avia aero-engine factory, was appointed chief designer of the Polish Central Engine Office, and later the Aero-engine department of the Polish Aviation Institute (Instytut Lotnictwa, IL). He led the design of the WN-1, a 48 kW (65 hp) air-cooled flat-four piston engine which was the first post-war Polish aero-engine, followed by the 213 kW (285 hp) WN-2 in 1947, but both of these engines failed to enter production.

In 1952 Narkiewicz set up a small design team to design a new seven-cylinder radial engine, the WN-3. The first prototype, rated at 220 kW (300 hp) was completed in 1954, and by the time testing was completed in 1955, the engine's power rose to 250 kW (330 hp). The WN-3 entered production in 1956, powering the PZL TS-8 Bies training aircraft.

The engine was produced in 1957-1960 by WSK-Kalisz in Kalisz, it might be known also as PZL WN-3, or (in Western sources) as Narkiewicz WN-3.

== Variants ==
WN-3
Production version, 250 kW (330 hp).
WN-4
Modified version for use in helicopters.

== Applications ==
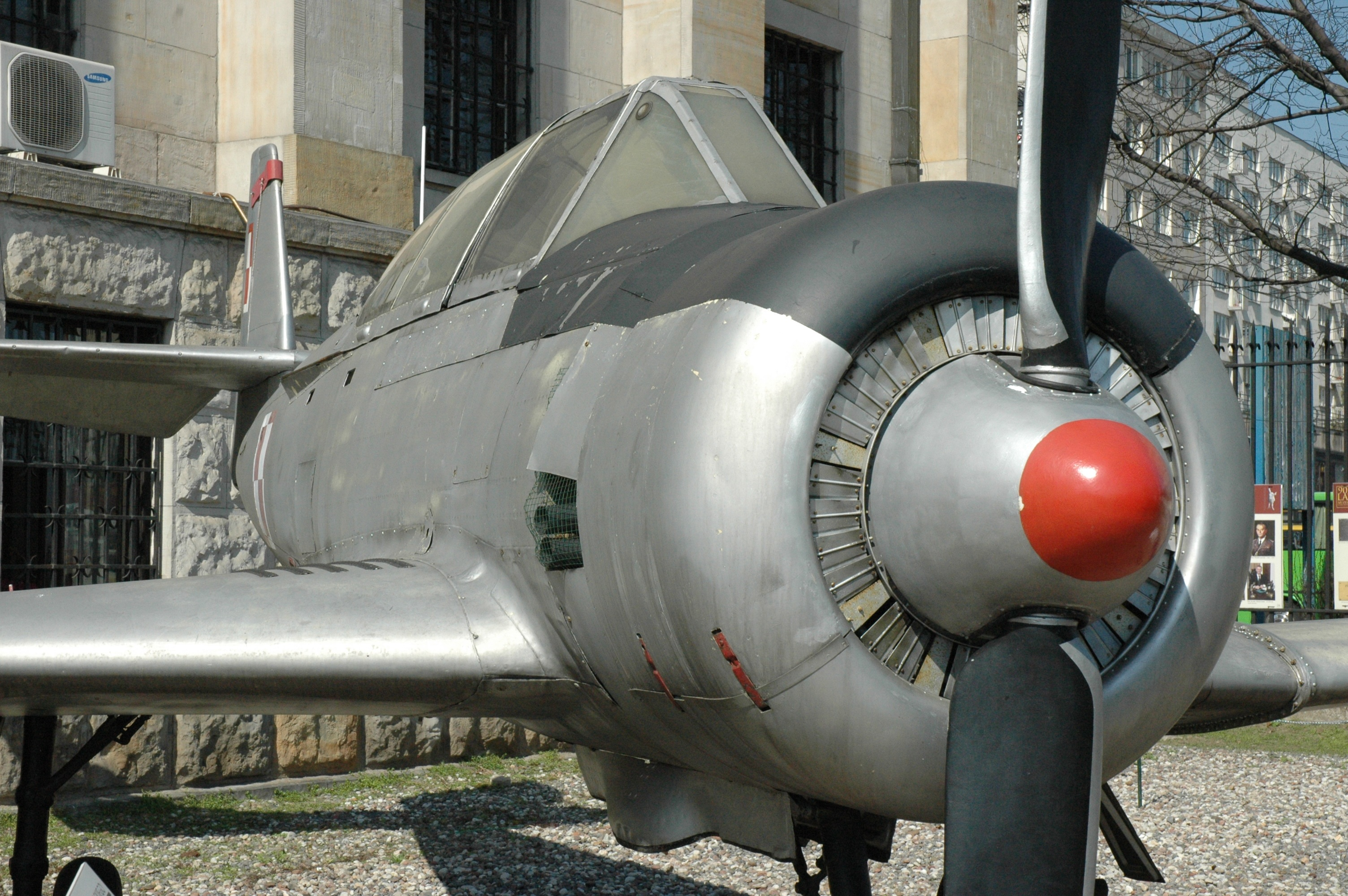
The WN-3 in PZL TS-8 Bies

- PZL TS-8 Bies
- PZL MD-12 (prototype)
- BŻ-4 Żuk (prototype)

== Specifications ==
Data from Jane's All The World's Aircraft 1961–62

=== General characteristics ===
- Type: Seven-cylinder single-row air-cooled radial engine
- Bore: 135 mm (5.31 in)
- Stroke: 134 mm (5.28 in)
- Displacement: 13.4 L (820 cu in)
- Length: 885 mm (34.8 in)
- Diameter: 1,106 mm (43.5 in)
- Dry weight: 240 kg (530 lb) dry

=== Components ===
- Valvetrain: one inlet and one outlet valve per cylinder, pushrod actuated
- Fuel system: K-14WN carburettor
- Fuel type: petrol, 72 octane or more
- Oil system: Dry sump

=== Performance ===
- Power output: 250 kW (330 hp) at 2,500 rpm (max power)

211 kW (283 hp) (nominal)
180 kW (240 hp) at 2,100 rpm (econ cruise)

- Specific power: 18.4 kW/L (0.40 hp/cu in)
- Compression ratio: 6.2:1
- Specific fuel consumption: .186–.201 kg/kWh (0.114–0.123 lb/MJ) at max power
  .160 kg/kWh (0.098 lb/MJ) (econ cruise)
