= Gazda Helicospeeder =

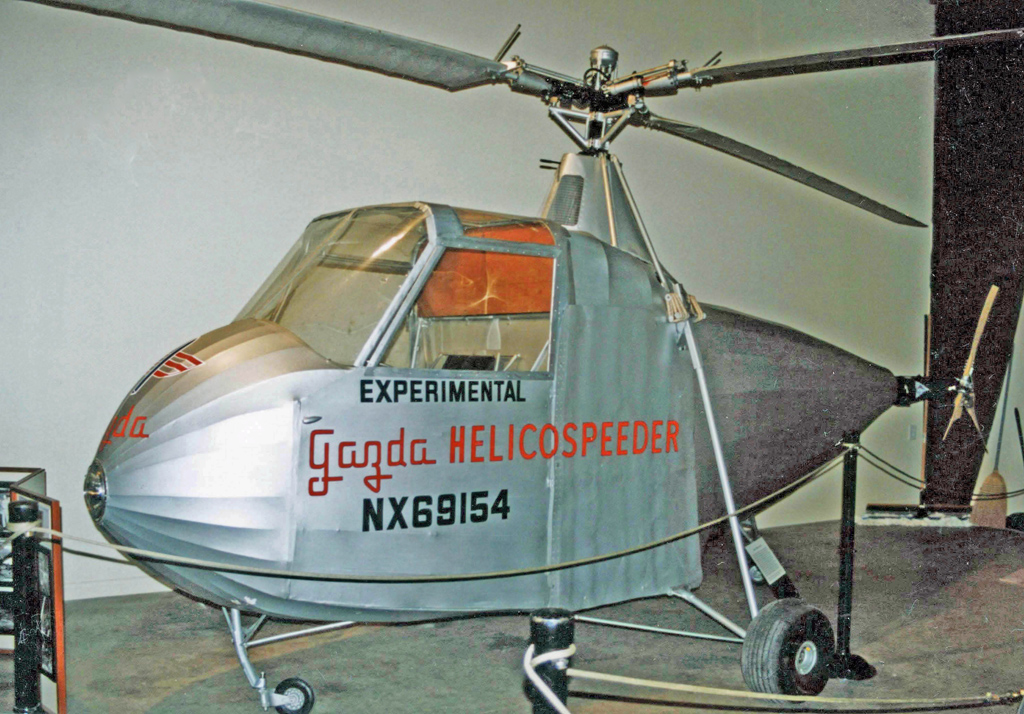
- The Model 100 preserved at the Owls Head Transportation Museum near Rockland, Maine in 2005

General information
- Type: rotorcraft
- National origin: United States
- Manufacturer: Helicopter Engineering & Construction Co
- Designer: Antoine Gazda
- Status: one example is preserved
- Primary user: constructor
- Number built: 2

History
- Manufactured: 1946-1947
- First flight: 1946

The Gazda Helicospeeder was an American-built single-seat single-rotor helicopter of the 1940s.

== Development ==
The Helicospeeder was designed by Antoine Gazda of Wakefield, Rhode Island in 1946. It was specified to carry one person and publicity releases claimed an ultimate goal of a 300 mph (483 km/h) maximum airspeed. One example of the initial version was completed.

The Model 100 Helicospeeder was developed in 1947, again with a single seat. It was of all-aluminium construction and was powered by a Continental A-75 engine. One example was completed.

== Operational history ==
The designer/constructor carried out test flights and a more modest actual speed of 100 mph (161 km/h) was reached. Production examples were expected to sell for 5000 US Dollars, but no firm sales were made.

== Variants ==
Antoine Gazda planned to build the Model 101, which was intended to accommodate two persons, but no record of its completion has been found.

== Aircraft on display ==
The Model 100 Helicospeeder is preserved at the Owls Head Transportation Museum, adjacent to the Knox County Regional Airport, two miles south of Rockland, Maine.

== Specifications (Model 100) ==
Data from Aerofiles

General characteristics

- Crew: 1
- Powerplant: 1 × Continental A-75 piston, 75 hp (56 kW)
- Main rotor diameter: 19 ft 6 in (5.94 m)

Performance

- Maximum speed: 100 mph (160 km/h, 87 kn)

== See also ==
Aircraft of comparable role, configuration, and era

- BŻ-1 GIL
