= BŻ-1 GIL =

BŻ-1 "GIL"
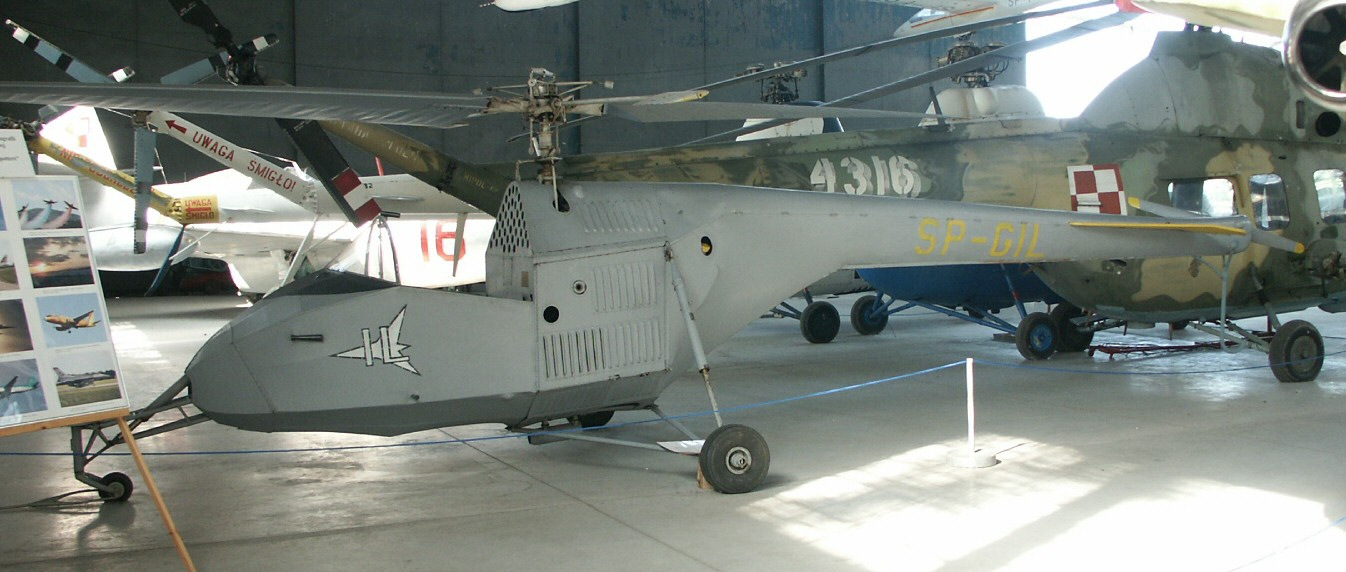
- BŻ-1 Gil at the Polish Aviation Museum

General information
- Type: Helicopter
- Manufacturer: Główny Instytut Lotnictwa
- Status: Experimental
- Primary user: Poland
- Number built: 1

History
- First flight: 4 April 1950
- Retired: 1960

The BŻ-1 GIL was the first Polish experimental helicopter, constructed in 1950. Developed by the Main Aviation Institute (Warsaw), the only constructed GIL saw service until 1960 when it was irreparably damaged and subsequently decommissioned. The prototype aircraft currently resides at the Polish Aviation Museum.

== Design and development ==
The helicopter was designed at the research institute Główny Instytut Lotnictwa - Main Aviation Institute in Warsaw, from an initiative of Zbigniew Brzoska. It was a difficult task, because Polish aviation industry was entirely destroyed during World War II. In addition, the institute principal Władysław Fiszdon was the only person in a team, who had ever seen a helicopter (Sikorsky R-4 in England).

Despite severe material shortages, work on experimental design started in 1948, and the main designer became Bronisław Żurakowski (brother of test pilot Janusz Żurakowski), who designed a rotor and control system. It used simpler Hiller rotor type, with two auxiliary blades. A fuselage structure, tail boom, auxiliary rotor and tricycle undercarriage were designed by Tadeusz Chyliński. A power unit and final drive were designed by Zbigniew Brzoska. The design utilized some components left by the Germans, like a piston engine Hirth HM 504 (re-configured for vertical use), rear gear from a Zündapp motorcycle and wheels from a DFS Kranich glider's jettisonable landing gear.

Initially, the helicopter had no name. It only received the registration letters SP-GIL, from the institute abbreviation, and hence it soon became known as GIL or Gil (gil means a bullfinch in Polish). Later it was also given the designation BŻ-1, from Żurakowski's initials.

== Operational history ==
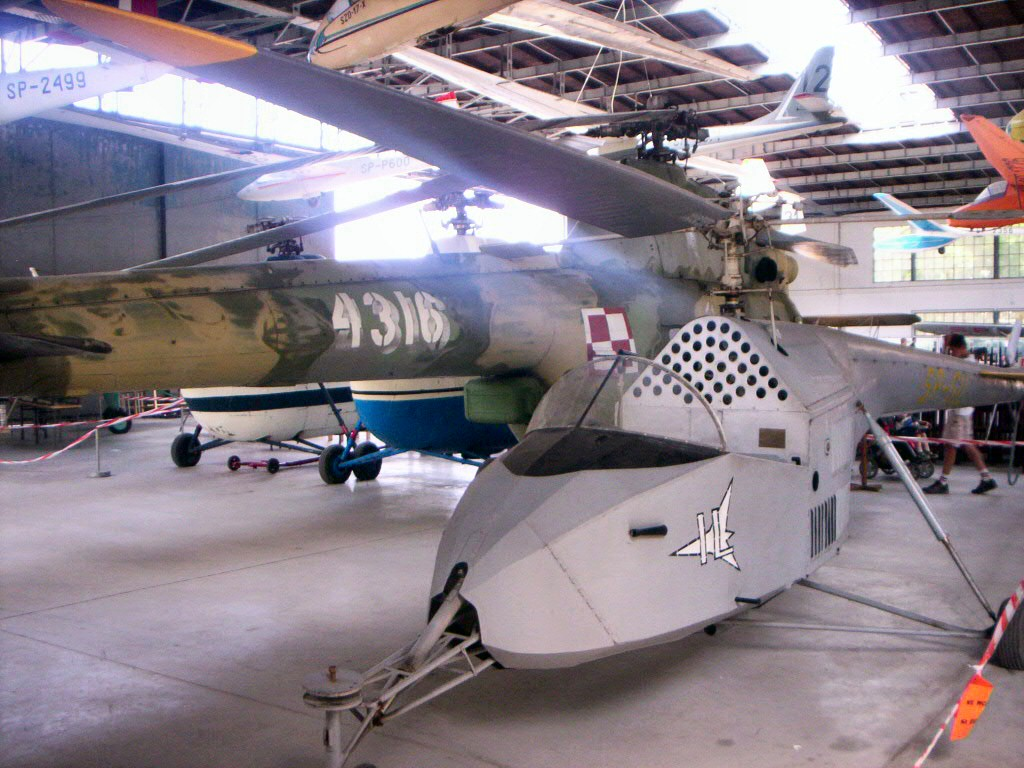
BŻ-1 GIL

The helicopter was completed by the end of 1949. During the first flight trial on 14 January 1950, it was overturned by a wind gust and had to be repaired. The test pilot was Bronisław Żurakowski, who taught himself to fly a helicopter. The helicopter first flew on 4 April 1950, restrained on tethers by two men (Fiszdon and Chyliński) for a measure of safety.

During 1950–1953, it underwent a test program and was often modified. At first it had elastic rotor blades. In 1950, it was fitted with rigid blades and an efficient simple custom-designed resonant vibration eliminator, similar to later Sikorsky designs. During tests, it crashed or was damaged without casualties at least seven times, for different reasons, and was repaired each time.

On 20 July 1952, the BŻ-1 GIL was first displayed to the public, during an air show at Okęcie airfield (it was the first public presentation of a helicopter in Poland and one of first presentations in the Eastern Bloc). On 16 November 1953, the helicopter was damaged when the main rotor was bent by the wind and cut off the tail boom, thus ending the test program. By then, the prototype had completed 169 flights, in 20 hours 21 minutes in total.

In 1956, the helicopter was repaired and used for training flights. On 28 June 1957 a tail rotor gear (originally from a motorcycle) broke and it could not be replaced, consequently, the helicopter never flew again, being written off on 28 October 1960. During 1956–1957 it had completed 185 flights, for a total of 12.5 hours.

Currently, the sole BŻ-1 GIL is preserved in the Polish Aviation Museum in Kraków.

== Specifications ==
Data from Lotnictwo : Powrót GILa i jego dalsze losy

General characteristics

- Crew: 1
- Length: 8.5 m (27 ft 11 in)
- Height: 3 m (9 ft 10 in)
- Empty weight: 510 kg (1,124 lb)
- Gross weight: 610 kg (1,345 lb)
- Powerplant: 1 × Hirth HM 504 4-cylinder air-cooled in-line piston engine, 78 kW (105 hp) vertically mounted
- Main rotor diameter: 8.8 m (28 ft 10 in)
- Main rotor area: 60.8 m^{2} (654 sq ft)

Performance

- Maximum speed: 140 km/h (87 mph, 76 kn)
- Service ceiling: 2,000 m (6,600 ft)
- Rate of climb: 4.5 m/s (890 ft/min)

== See also ==
Related development

- BŻ-4 Żuk

Aircraft of comparable role, configuration, and era

- Aero XE-II
- Gazda Helicospeeder
- Vought-Sikorsky 300
