= RWD 18 =

General information
- Type: STOL Utility Aircraft
- National origin: Poland
- Manufacturer: Doświadczalne Warsztaty Lotnicze
- Designer: Stanisław Rogalski, Leszek Dulęba, Tadeusz Chyliński
- Number built: 1

History
- First flight: scheduled for December 1939

The RWD 18 was a four/five seat STOL (Short Take-Off and Landing) utility aircraft designed and built in Poland from 1936.

== Development ==
DWL studied a small twin-engined STOL utility aircraft as a private venture due to the lack of official support, hoping to kindle new markets in multi-engined, utility and business aircraft. The RWD 18s safe handling characteristics and STOL capability were derived from the full span leading edge slats, which were operated by servo suction from a leading edge mounted venturi tube, and the fixed tri-cycle undercarriage. Construction was to have been mixed with wooden cantilever high wings having anhedral on the inner sections, fitted with full span powered leading edge slats and trailing edge flaps. The fuselage was a welded steel tube framework faired with wooden formers, covered with plywood and fabric, fitted out with a dual control cockpit and a bench seat in the cabin for two or three. At the rear of the fuselage a cantilever twin finned wooden tail unit was fitted to improve low-speed yaw control and stability.

The spatted undercarriage legs were cantilevered from the engine nacelles and the fuselage under the nose with the main wheels fitted with 'Bendix' pneumatic brake units and the nosewheel steerable from the rudder bar. Any engine of around 150 hp could be fitted, but the prototype was fitted with 150 hp Cirrus Major four-cylinder inverted in-line engines fitted in nacelles at the junctions of the inner and outer wings.

An RWD 9 was converted to the RWD 20, by fitting a tri-cycle undercarriage, to speed the development of the RWD 18s, with extensive trials carried out including rough and ploughed field landings, take-offs and taxiing. Flight trials were scheduled to be carried out in December 1939 but the incomplete prototype was destroyed in an air raid during the German invasion of 1939.

== Specifications (RWD 18 estimated) ==
Data from Cynk, Jerzy B.. “Polish Aircraft 1893 – 1939”. London, Putnam. 1971. ISBN 0-370-00085-4

General characteristics

- Crew: 1/2
- Capacity: 4/5
- Gross weight: 1,500 kg (3,306 lb)

Performance

- Maximum speed: 270 km/h (168 mph, 146 kn)
- Cruise speed: 230 km/h (143 mph, 124 kn)
- Range: 1,000 to 2,000 km (621–1,242 mi, 540–1,079 nmi) dependent on load

== See also ==
Related development

- RWD 22
- RWD 20

Aircraft of comparable role, configuration, and era

- Miles Aerovan
- Dornier Do 28
- Scottish Aviation Twin Pioneer
