= PZL MD-12 =

MD-12
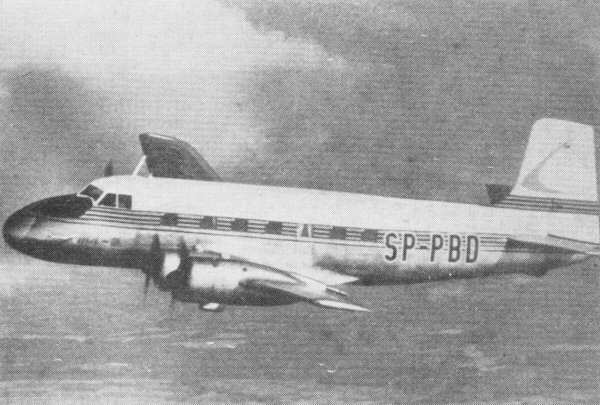
- MD-12P prototype

General information
- Type: Passenger aircraft
- Manufacturer: WSK-Okęcie
- Primary user: LOT Polish Airlines
- Number built: 3

History
- Introduction date: 1961
- First flight: 21 July 1959
- Retired: 1965 (MD-12P); 1967 (MD-12F)

The MD-12 is a Polish four-engined short-range passenger and civil utility aircraft of the 1960s, which remained in the prototype stage. The PZL brand is conventional, since it did not enter production, and was referred to under its project designation only.

== Design and development ==
The aircraft was developed as a successor to the Lisunov Li-2 on short domestic routes for LOT Polish Airlines. The plane was designed by a design bureau led by Franciszek Misztal in the Aviation Institute (Instytut Lotnictwa). The first design work started in 1954 (under the designation FM-12, for 16 passengers). The final design MD-12 appeared in 1956, after Leszek Dulęba had joined the team (the designations apparently came from Franciszek Misztal, then Misztal-Dulęba). Initially it was to be powered with two Soviet 615 hp Shvetsov ASh-21 engines, but because their production ceased, a four-engine configuration was chosen, with Polish 315 hp WN-3 engines. At the end of 1957 the bureau was moved to the OKL centre (Ośrodek Konstrukcji Lotniczych – Aviation Designs' Centre), created in the WSK-Okęcie factory.

The first prototype flew first on 21 July 1959 (registration SP-PAL), the second prototype, designated MD-12P (SP-PBD), and fitted with complete passenger cab, flew on 7 January 1961. There was another airframe built for static trials in 1959. The plane underwent state trials in 1961, and the second prototype was evaluated by LOT Airlines in August–September 1961.

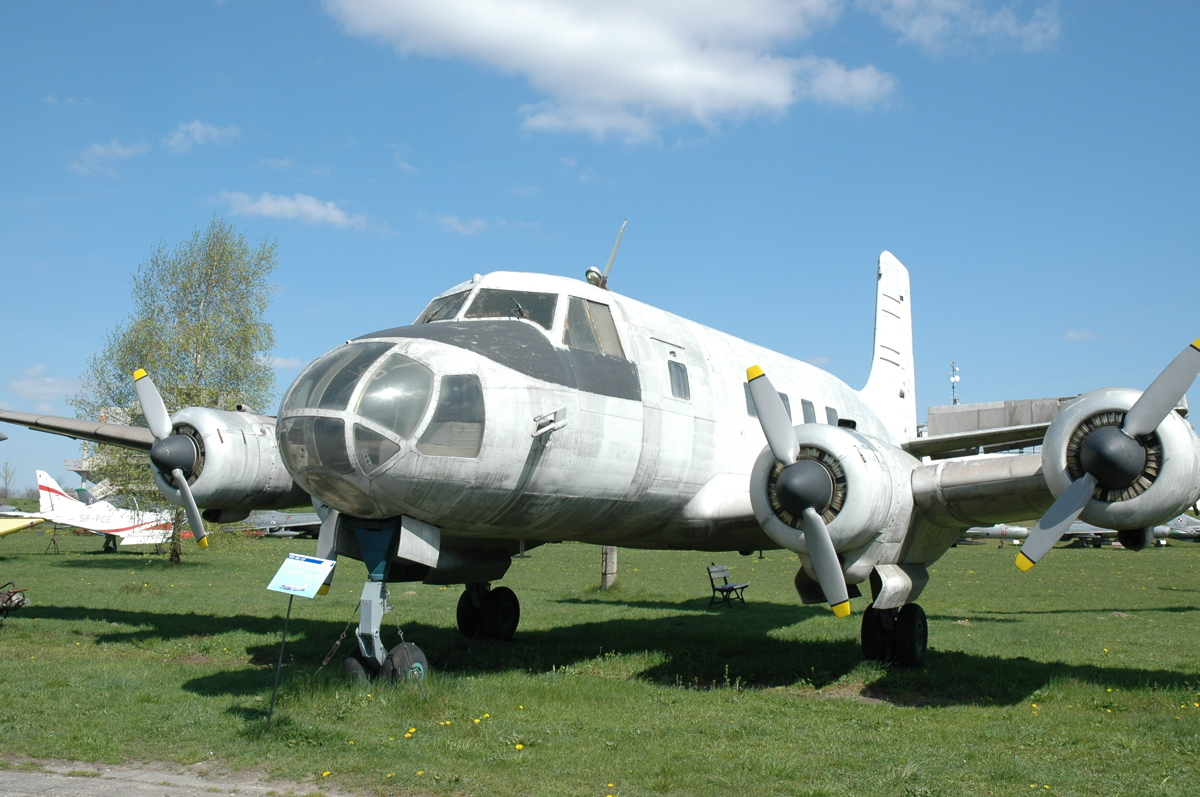
MD-12F in the Polish Aviation Museum, in Cracow

The passenger variant was evaluated as quite successful, being easier to fly than the Ilyushin Il-14 and more economical, but it was not produced because LOT found it unprofitable to order special planes for domestic routes. The small production that would result would increase costs. Instead, less modern airliners were switched from international to domestic routes.

It was next decided to build an aerial photography variant MD-12F. It was fitted with several cameras and other equipment, including a darkroom. The fuselage nose was glazed, with a navigator post. The wingspan was increased to 23.6m by adding longer wingtips. Also fuel tanks were increased to 1160 litres in order to enhance endurance to 10 hours. The MD-12F flew first on 21 July 1962 (apparently dates of MD-12 prototypes' flights were adjusted to add splendour to communist Poland's national day, 22 July). It carried the registration SP-PBL. The aerial photography variant was successful and countries, like the USSR, Hungary, Romania and Pakistan were interested in it, but its development was abandoned after a crash of the first MD-12 prototype on 17 September 1963 near Grójec. The plane crashed due to flutter of tail control surfaces and the crew of five were killed.

== Operational service ==
The prototype MD-12P (SP-PBD) was evaluated by the LOT Polish Airlines in August–September 1961, on Warsaw-Rzeszów route, carrying over 1700 passengers. It was also used in 1961 and 1962 on Warsaw-Poznań route, taking trips to Poznań International Fair.

== Design ==
The MD-12 was a four-engined low-wing cantilever monoplane of all-metal construction, duralumin-covered. The fuselage was a semi-monocoque. The crew cockpit in front with a crew of two pilots. Passenger cab with 20 seats, three in a row. In the rear there was a toilet. Fuselage had doors in front part. In a fuselage nose there was a baggage space for 200 kg. Trapezoid three-part wing. Single tailfin. Engine nacelles in wings. Two-blade wooden propellers WR-1A of a variable pitch, 2.2 m diameter (powerplants were adapted from the TS-8 Bies trainer). Retractable tricycle landing gear – main gear with single wheels retractable to inner engine nacelles. Fuel tanks 1160 L in wings (cruise fuel consumption 240 L/h).

== Variants ==
MD-12
Prototype. One built, registered as SP-PAL.
MD-12P
Passenger version. One built, registered as SP-PBD.
MD-12F
Aerial photography version with glazed nose and increased wing span. One built, registered as SP-PBL.

== Operators ==
Poland

- LOT Polish Airlines

== Surviving aircraft ==
The MD-12F is preserved in the Polish Aviation Museum in Kraków, from 1967.

== Specifications (MD-12F) ==
Data from Jane's All The World's Aircraft 1965–66

General characteristics

- Crew: 2
- Capacity: 20 passengers
- Length: 15.8 m (51 ft 10 in)
- Wingspan: 23.60 m (77 ft 5 in)
- Height: 5.95 m (19 ft 6 in)
- Wing area: 57.0 m^{2} (614 sq ft)
- Aspect ratio: 9.45:1
- Airfoil: NACA 23015 at root, NACA 23009 at tip
- Empty weight: 5,025 kg (11,078 lb)
- Max takeoff weight: 7,000 kg (15,432 lb)
- Fuel capacity: 1,600 L (420 US gal; 350 imp gal)
- Powerplant: 4 × WN-3 air-cooled 7-cylinder radial engines, 250 kW (330 hp) each
- Propellers: 2-bladed WR-1A constant-speed propellers, 2.20 m (7 ft 3 in) diameter

Performance

- Maximum speed: 305 km/h (190 mph, 165 kn)
- Cruise speed: 280 km/h (170 mph, 150 kn) (max cruise)
- Stall speed: 100 km/h (62 mph, 54 kn)
- Never exceed speed: 370 km/h (230 mph, 200 kn)
- Range: 2,100 km (1,300 mi, 1,100 nmi)
- Service ceiling: 5,200 m (17,100 ft)
- Rate of climb: 5.8 m/s (1,140 ft/min)
- Takeoff distance to 15 m (50 ft): 650 m (2,133 ft)
- Landing distance from 15 m (50 ft): 500 m (1,640 ft)

== See also ==
- McDonnell Douglas MD-12

Aircraft of comparable role, configuration, and era

- De Havilland Heron
- Potez 840
- Ilyushin Il-14
