= RWD 23 =

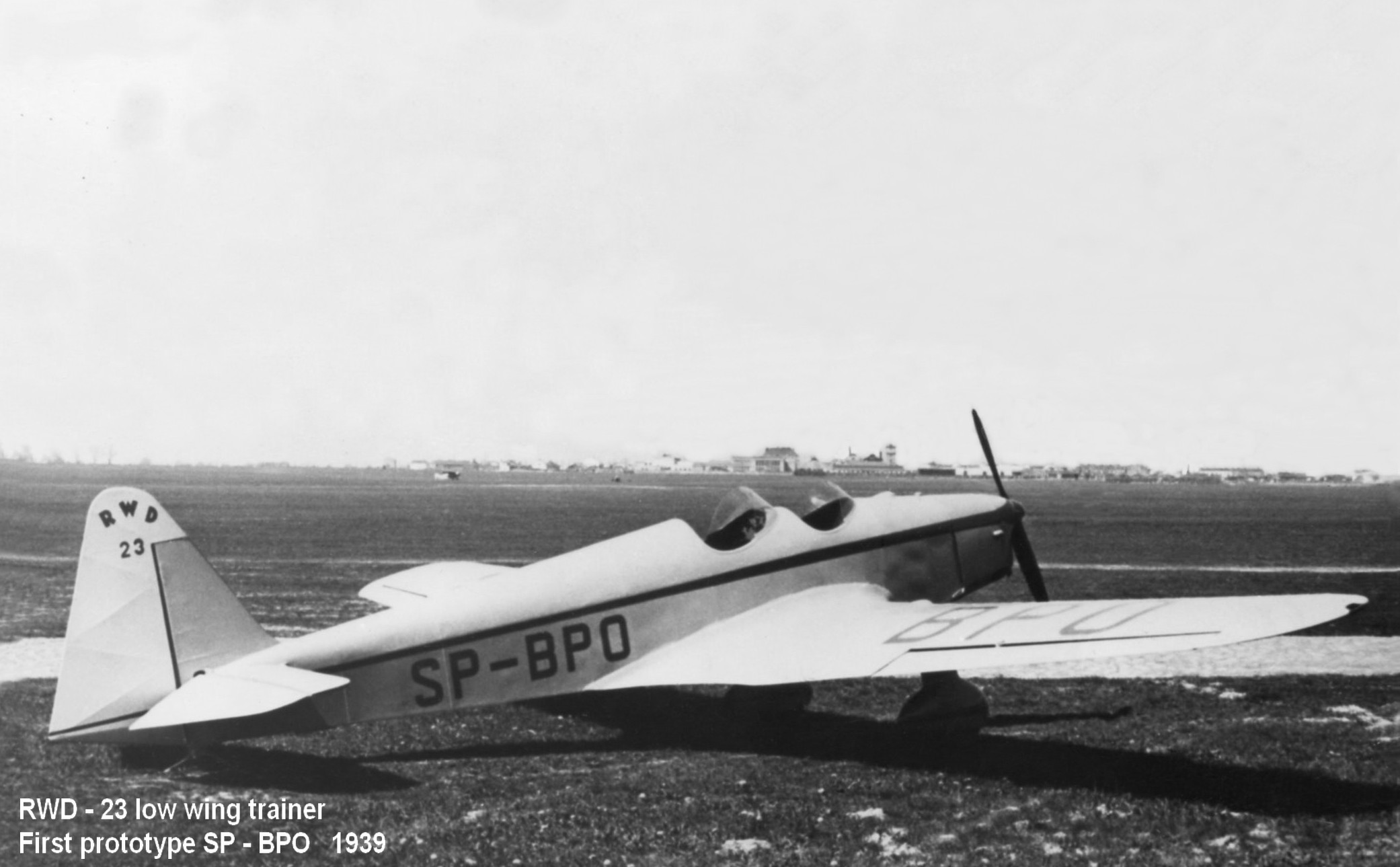

General information
- Type: Trainer
- Manufacturer: DWL
- Designer: RWD team
- Status: prototype
- Primary user: Poland
- Number built: 1

History
- First flight: 1938/1939

The RWD 23 was a Polish low-wing trainer aircraft of 1938, constructed by the RWD team, that remained a prototype.

== Development ==
The aircraft was designed in 1938 to fill the gap in the Polish trainer aircraft, by creating a light low-wing trainer. All trainers built in series in Poland to that point were high-wing monoplanes, for example the RWD-8 or the various biplanes. The main designer was Andrzej Anczutin of the RWD bureau. Among the designers were also Bronisław Żurakowski and Tadeusz Chyliński. Chyliński designed the base mount for its engine. The plane was similar to de Havilland Moth Minor, but over 100 kg lighter. Low power output and simple wooden construction would make it cheap and economical in service, and therefore it might replace the RWD-8 in aeroclubs.

The first prototype (registration SP-BPO) was flown in late 1938 or early 1939 in Warsaw by E. Przysiecki. It underwent factory trials in June 1939, then it was given to tests to the Aviation Technical Institute. It was destroyed in the first days of World War II, in September 1939. The plane was found as successful, it could also perform basic aerobatics.

The second improved prototype was under construction when the war broke out, but it was not completed. The LOPP paramilitary organization ordered a series of 10 aircraft, that were not completed due to the war.

== Description ==
Wooden construction low-wing cantilever monoplane, conventional in layout, with a fixed landing gear and open cockpits. Fuselage semi-monocoque, rectangular in cross-section, plywood-covered. Single-piece trapezoid wings with rounded tips, single-spar, plywood (front) and canvas covered, fitted with flaps. Conventional tail of a shape typical to RWD designs, like RWD 8, plywood (fins) and canvas (elevators and rudder) covered. Two open cockpits in tandem, with individual windshields and twin controls. Rear cockpit was raised a bit for a better view. Conventional fixed landing gear with a rear skid, main gear in aerodynamic covers.

62 hp (46 kW) Walter Mikron II inline engine in front, with two-blade wooden propeller. 90 hp (67 kW) Cirrus Minor or 63 hp Avia 3 engines could also to be installed. Fuel tank 45 L in a fuselage, cruise fuel consumption 14 L/h. (

== Specifications (RWD 23 prototype) ==
Data from Polish Aircraft 1893-1939

General characteristics

- Crew: 2
- Length: 8 m (26 ft 3 in)
- Wingspan: 11.1 m (36 ft 5 in)
- Mid wingspan: 1.9 m (6 ft 3 in)
- Wing area: 16 m^{2} (170 sq ft)
- Empty weight: 325 kg (717 lb)
- Gross weight: 550 kg (1,213 lb)
- Fuel capacity: 50 L (11 imp gal)
- Powerplant: 1 × Walter Mikron II 4-cylinder air-cooled inverted in-line piston engine, 48 kW (65 hp)
  - or 1 x 48 kW (64 hp) Avia 3
  - or 1 x 67 kW (90 hp) Blackburn Cirrus Minor

Performance

- Maximum speed: 171 km/h (106 mph, 92 kn) at sea level
- Cruise speed: 145 km/h (90 mph, 78 kn)
- Stall speed: 65 km/h (40 mph, 35 kn)
- Range: 450 km (280 mi, 240 nmi)
- Service ceiling: 4,000 m (13,000 ft)
- Rate of climb: 2 m/s (390 ft/min)
- Time to altitude: 1,000 m (3,300 ft) in 8 minutes
- Wing loading: 34.4 kg/m^{2} (7.0 lb/sq ft)
- Power/mass: 0.081 kW/kg (0.049 hp/lb)

== See also ==
Aircraft of comparable role, configuration, and era

- de Havilland Moth Minor
- ICAR Universal
- Yakovlev UT-2
- Miles Hawk Trainer
- CSS-10
