= BŻ-4 Żuk =

Polish helicopter

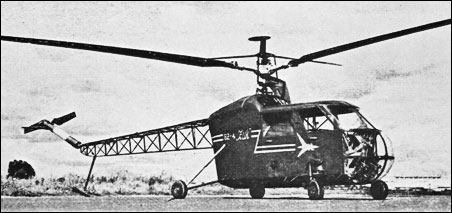

General information
- Type: Helicopter
- Manufacturer: Główny Instytut Lotnictwa (GIL)
- Designer: Bronisław Żurakowski
- Status: Cancelled
- Number built: 1 prototype +2 partially built

History
- First flight: 10 February 1959

The BŻ-4 Żuk ("Beetle" in Polish), formerly known as GIL-4, was a Polish four-seat light helicopter built in the 1950s. Although it pioneered a novel rotor and transmission system, it never entered series production.

== Design and development ==
Work on the GIL-4 began at the Główny Instytut Lotnictwa - Main Aviation Institute (GIL), in Warsaw in 1953, under the leadership of Dipl. Ing. Bronisław Żurakowski, who had earlier designed the experimental BŻ-1 GIL helicopter, the first successful rotating-wing aircraft built in Poland. Progress was slow. The main object was to produce a simple and inexpensive general use light helicopter and to further development of the novel rotor and transmission system, which eliminates vibration and improves control.

The BŻ-4 Żuk was based on a single main three-blade rotor powered by an indigenous 240 kW (320 hp) Narkiewicz WN-4 piston engine in a fuselage made of a steel frame, behind a cabin section. It had an open frame rear boom structure and a fixed four-wheel undercarriage. Main rotor was atypical, for it had a smaller upper steering rotor and was fitted with an automatic stabilization system, of the Hiller principle. The cabin had four doors with two front seats and a rear bench. There were two fuel tanks, 220 L in total.

Four main variants were planned: a passenger version accommodating a pilot and three passengers, an ambulance variant carrying pilot, one stretchers and an attendant, an agricultural variant carrying pilot and spraying or dusting equipment and a dual control trainer.

== Testing and evaluation ==
The first prototype of the BŻ-4 Żuk four-seat helicopter was manufactured and displayed publicly in the Polish Aviation Day Exhibition in August 1956. Due to a long program of ground testing and fixing faults, it flew first only on 10 February 1959 and completed 17 flights for a total of 3 hrs, 40 minutes. The Żuk was still in the development stage when further work was cancelled in favor of the licence production of the Mil Mi-1, that had already started in WSK PZL-Świdnik. The prototype was damaged during landing on 31 August 1959 and despite being repaired, was not used again. Two additional prototypes were not completed.

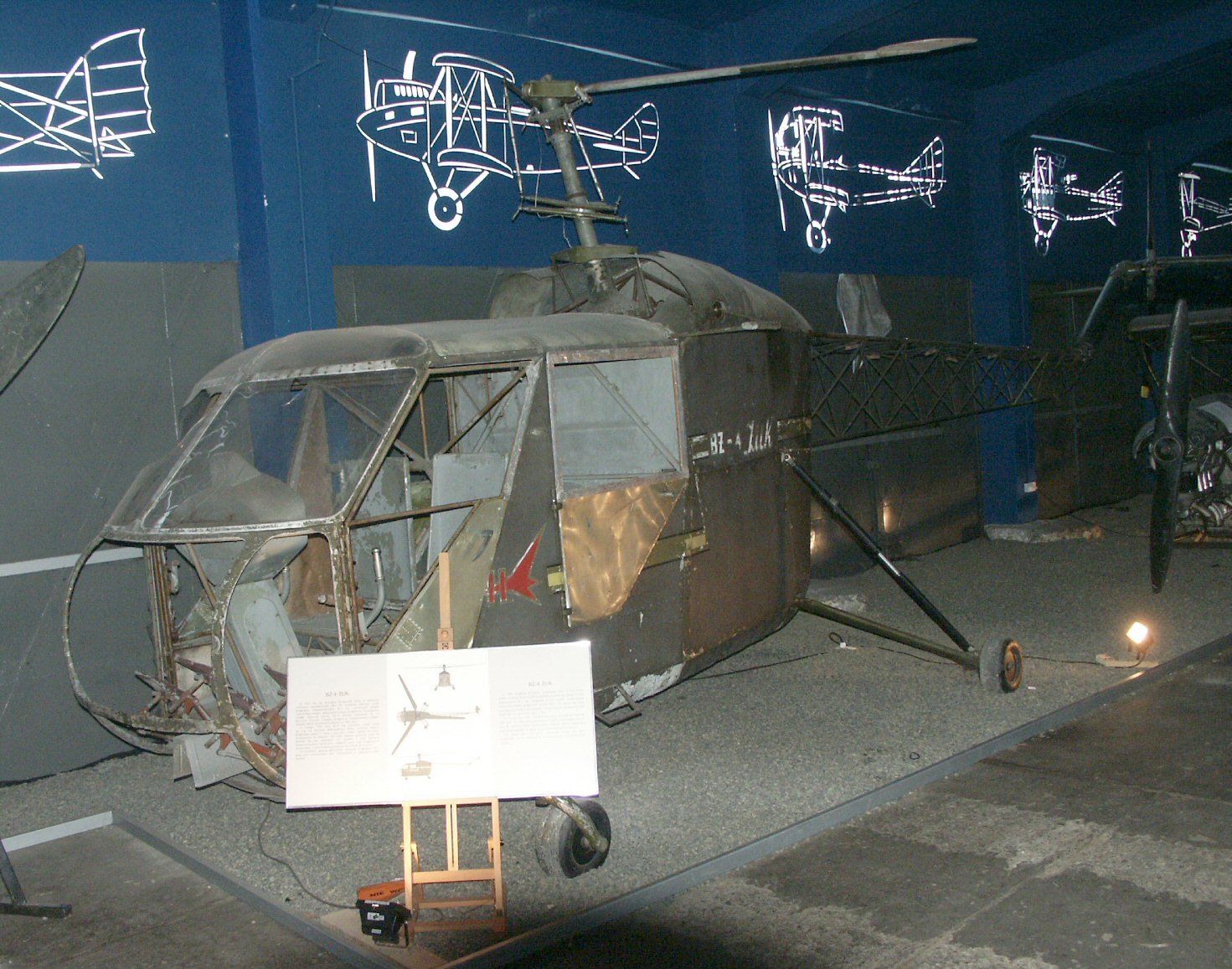
BŻ-4 prototype in the Polish Aviation Museum

One damaged and incomplete prototype is preserved in the Polish Aviation Museum in Kraków.

== Specifications (BŻ-4) ==
Data from Jane's All the World's Aircraft 1958-59

General characteristics

- Crew: 1
- Capacity: 3 pax / 450 kg (992 lb) payload
- Length: 12.75 m (41 ft 10 in) overall(inc. rotors)
- Height: 2.6 m (8 ft 6 in)
- Empty weight: 1,050 kg (2,315 lb)
- Gross weight: 1,500 kg (3,307 lb)
- Fuel capacity: 200 L (53 US gal; 44 imp gal) in two fuel tanks
- Powerplant: 1 × Narkiewicz WN-4 7-cylinder air-cooled radial piston engine, 240 kW (320 hp)
- Main rotor diameter: 12 m (39 ft 4 in)

Performance

- Maximum speed: 156 km/h (97 mph, 84 kn)
- Cruise speed: 125 km/h (78 mph, 67 kn)
- Economical cruise speed: 80 km/h (50 mph; 43 kn)
- Range: 260 km (160 mi, 140 nmi)
- Endurance: 2 hours 30 minutes
- Service ceiling: 3,000 m (9,800 ft)
- Hover ceiling IGE: 600 m (2,000 ft)
- Rate of climb: 4.6 m/s (910 ft/min)

== See also ==
Related development

- BŻ-1 GIL

Aircraft of comparable role, configuration, and era

- Sud-Est Alouette
- Sikorsky S-52
- PZL SM-2
- Bristol Sycamore
