= PZL TS-8 Bies =

Retired Polish trainer aircraft

TS-8 Bies
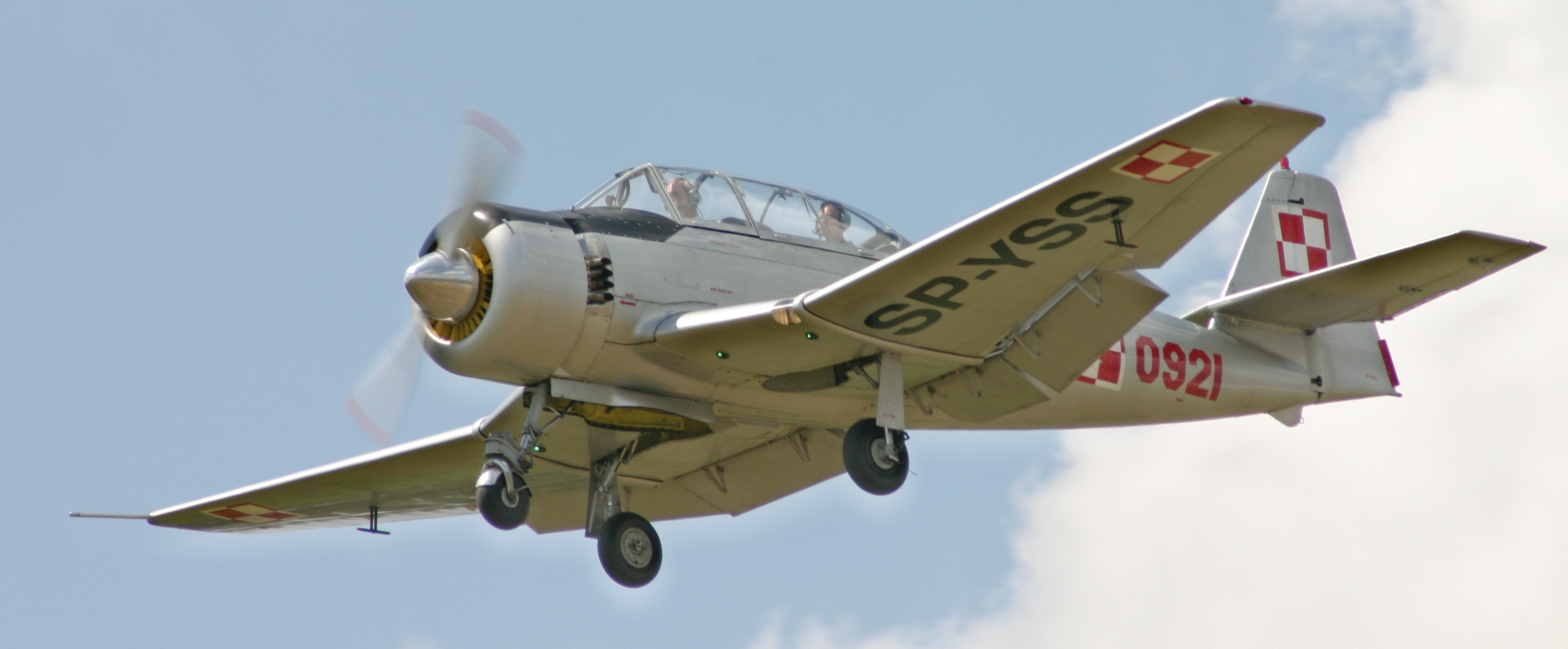
- TS-8 during Góraszka Air Show 2007

General information
- Type: Trainer aircraft
- Manufacturer: WSK PZL-Mielec
- Primary users: Polish Air Force Aeroklub Polski
- Number built: 251

History
- Manufactured: 1957–1960
- Introduction date: 1957
- First flight: 23 July 1955
- Retired: 1978

The PZL TS-8 Bies (Devil) is a Polish trainer aircraft, used from 1957 to the 1970s by the Polish Air Force and civilian aviation.

== Development ==
The aircraft was designed in response to a Polish Air Force requirement for a modern piston-engined trainer with a retractable tricycle landing gear to replace Junak 3 and Yak-11 aircraft. The main designer was Tadeusz Sołtyk – hence the designation letters TS. The plane was named Bies – a folk name for the devil. Work started in 1953 and the first prototype was flown on July 23, 1955. In 1956 and 1957 it beat three international records in its class. The second prototype was shown at the Paris Air Show in 1957.

In 1957 the first experimental series of 10 aircraft was produced by WSK-Okecie (designated as TS-8 BI). A slightly improved main variant, designated as the TS-8 BII, was produced from 1958 to 1960 by WSK Mielec. The last 10 machines, TS-8 BIII, were built with better avionics, in total 251 TS-8 were produced of which 229 were the TS-8 BII variant.

The TS-8 had good handling and performance; a noisy engine being one of its few flaws. It was the first really modern aircraft designed in Poland after the war, that also used a Polish engine.

== Design ==
The TS-8 was an all-metal low-wing cantilever monoplane, with metal-covered semi-monocoque fuselage, oval in cross-section. The three-part single-spar wing, of semi-monocoque design, creating a transverse inverted gull wing "W" shape. It had a Tricycle retractable landing gear, and a 7-cylinder WN-3 radial engine in front, delivering 330 hp take-off power and 283 hp normal power to a 2.2 m diameter two-blade variable pitch wooden propeller.

The crew of two, sat in a tandem enclosed cockpit, with twin controls, the student in front with the instructor in the rear. Canopy sections above the crewmen slid rearwards.

The plane had no armament, except for the experimental series TS-8 BI, which had one 12.7mm machine gun and two small bomb pylons.

== Operational history ==
The TS-8s began to be withdrawn from Polish Air Force service in the mid-1960s, being replaced by PZL TS-11 Iskra jet trainers. Over 100 withdrawn aircraft were handed over to the civilian aviation (aero clubs). Most TS-8s were finally withdrawn from civilian aviation by 1978, with three currently remaining airworthy. Two TS-8s were used by Indonesia.

== Variants ==
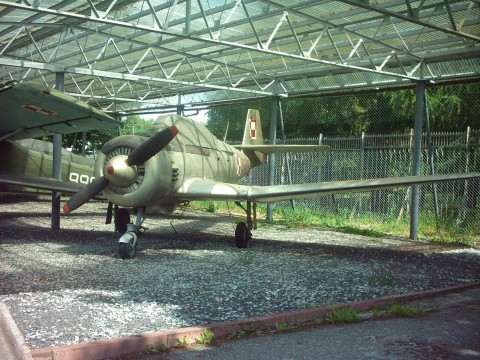
TS-8 Bies

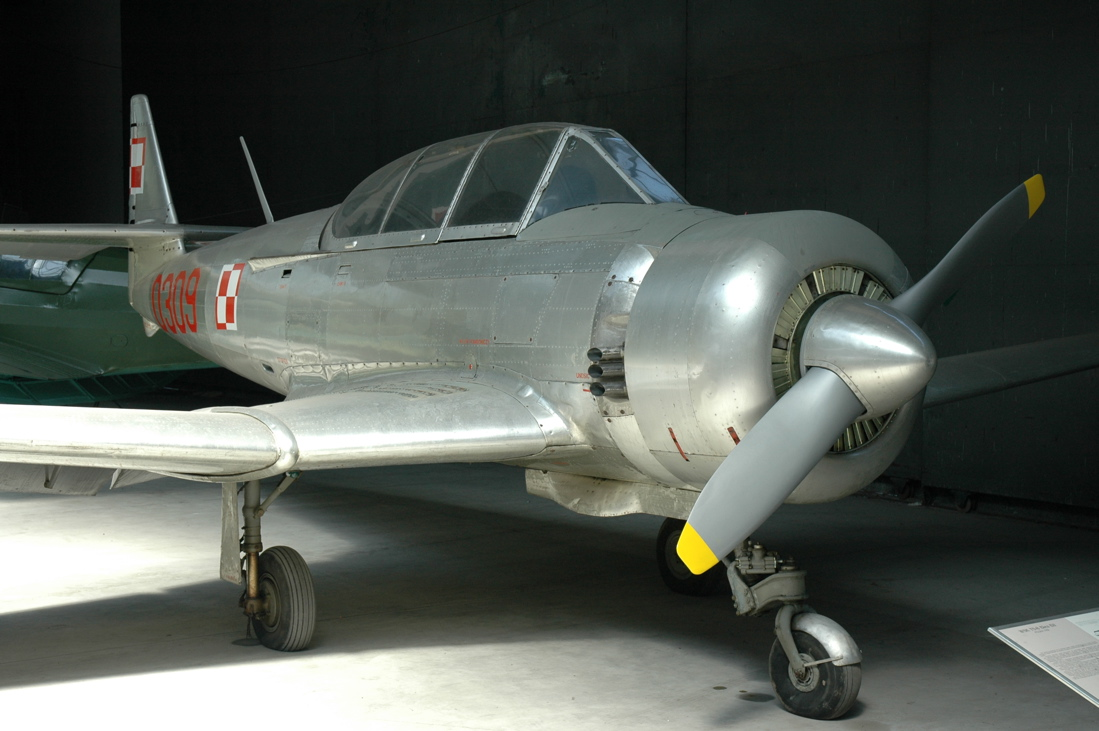
TS-8 BII at the Polish Aviation Museum

TS-8
3 prototypes.
TS-8 BI
First experimental series, 10 built.
TS-8 BII
Improved TS-8 BI. Main production version, 229 built.
TS-8 BIII
Version equipped with better avionics, 10 built.

== Operators ==
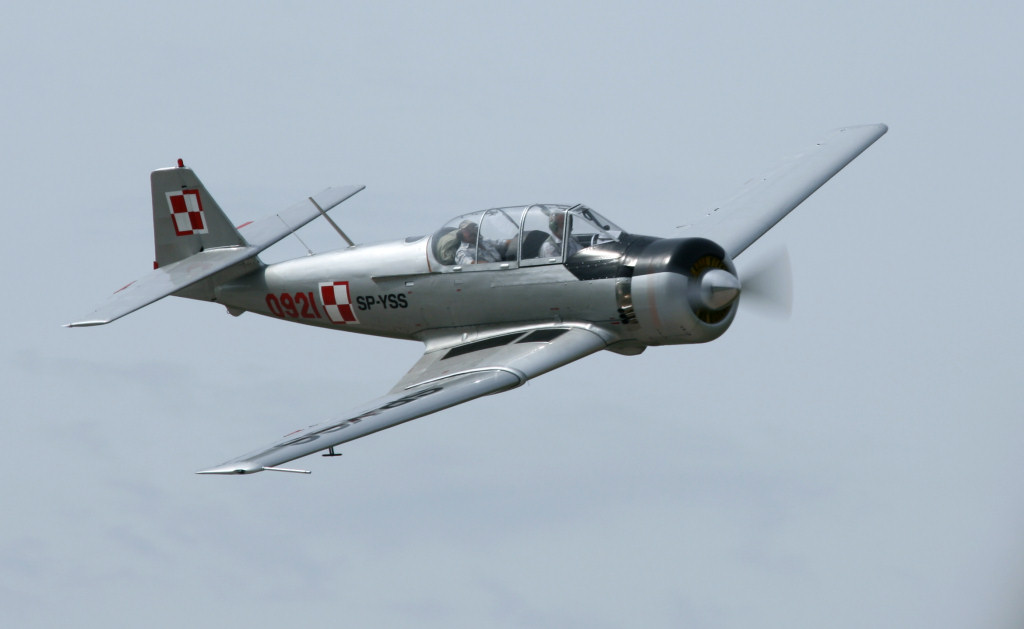
TS-8 Bies

Indonesia

- Indonesian Air Force received two aircraft which were based in Bandung.

Poland

- Polish Air Force
- Polish Navy
- Aeroklub Polski
- Private Operator: Single TS-8 S/N 1E-1004, F-AYTS, from 2018 to 2021 France, Bordeaux (LFCS).

== Specifications ==
Data from Jane's All The World's Aircraft 1961–62

General characteristics

- Crew: Two (student & instructor)
- Length: 8.50 m (27 ft 11 in)
- Wingspan: 10.50 m (34 ft 5 in)
- Height: 3.0 m (9 ft 10 in)
- Wing area: 19.10 m^{2} (205.6 sq ft)
- Aspect ratio: 7.38:1
- Airfoil: NACA 23012
- Empty weight: 1,070 kg (2,359 lb)
- Gross weight: 1,550 kg (3,417 lb)
- Max takeoff weight: 1,600 kg (3,527 lb)
- Fuel capacity: 215 L (56.8 US gal; 47.3 imp gal) in three fuselage tanks, with optional under-wing tanks
- Powerplant: 1 × Narkiewicz WN-3 7-cylinder radial engine, 240 kW (320 hp) ,rated power at 2350 rpm

250 kW (340 hp) maximum emergency power at 2500 rpm

- Propellers: 2-bladed W.R.1 constant-speed propeller, 2.20 m (7 ft 3 in) diameter

Performance

- Maximum speed: 312 km/h (194 mph, 168 kn)
- Cruise speed: 270 km/h (170 mph, 150 kn)
- Range: 800 km (500 mi, 430 nmi)
- Service ceiling: 6,000 m (20,000 ft)
- Rate of climb: 6.8 m/s (1,340 ft/min)

Armament

- Bombs: underwing racks for up to 200 kg (440 lb) of practice bombs

== See also ==
Aircraft of comparable role, configuration, and era

- Beechcraft T-34 Mentor
- Nanchang CJ-6
- North American T-28 Trojan
- Yakovlev Yak-11
- Yakovlev Yak-18
- Yakovlev Yak-52
