= Polish Aviation Museum =

Coordinates: 50°04′39.61″N 19°59′32.7″E

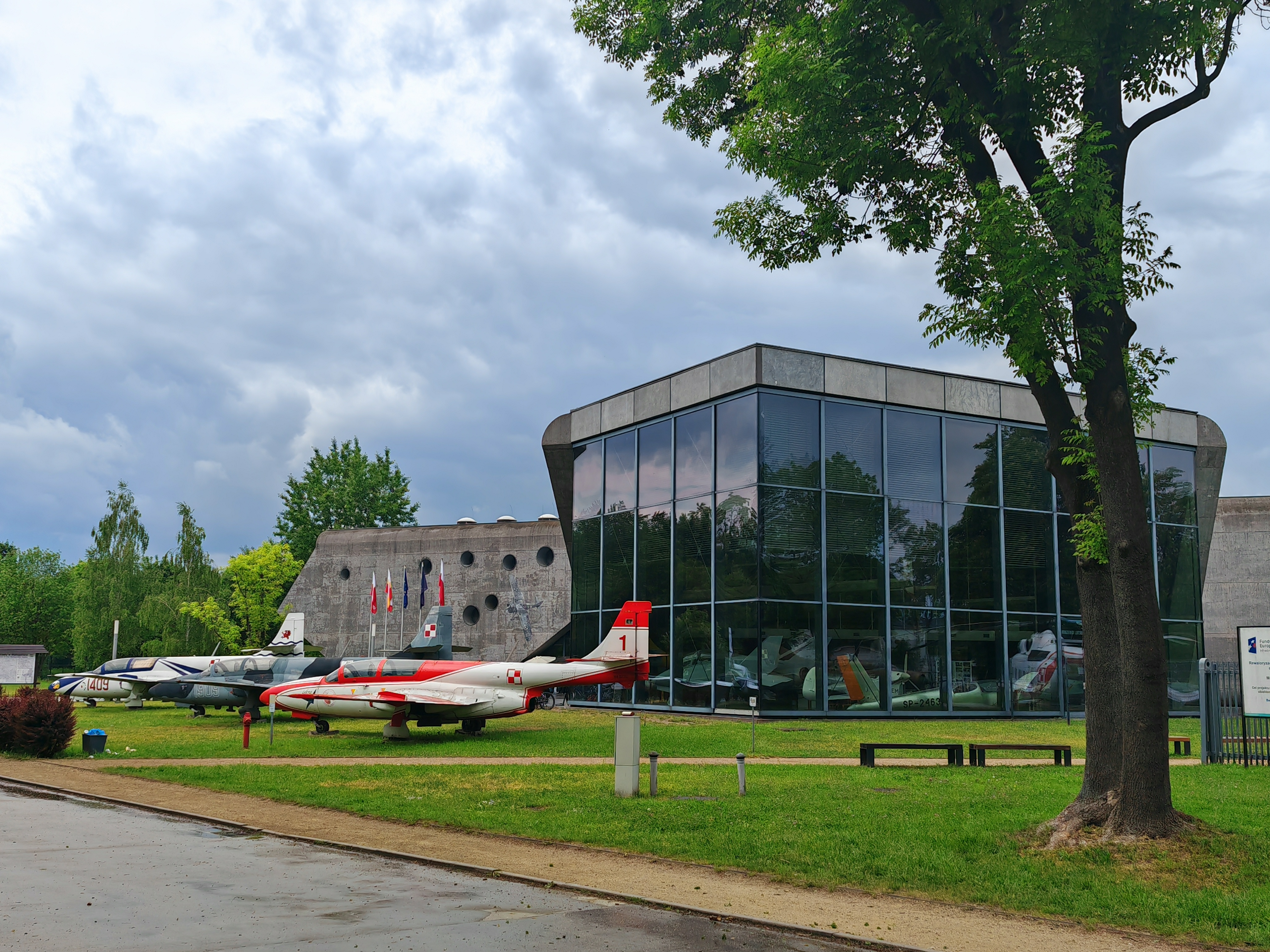
- Entrance to the museum and three TS-11 Iskra airplanes
- Established: 1964; 62 years ago
- Location: Kraków, Poland
- Type: Aviation museum
- Website: http://www.muzeumlotnictwa.pl

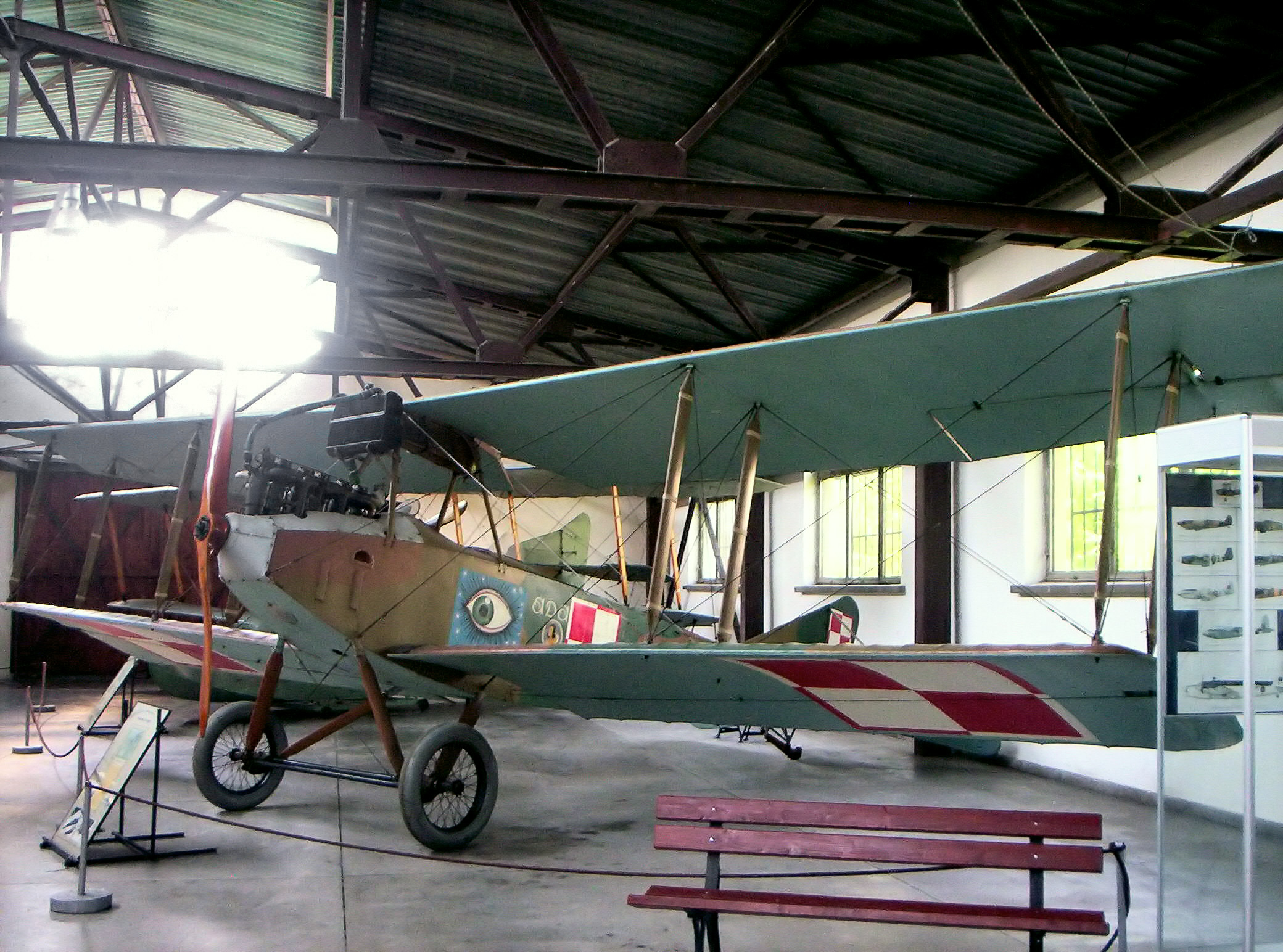
Albatros B.II

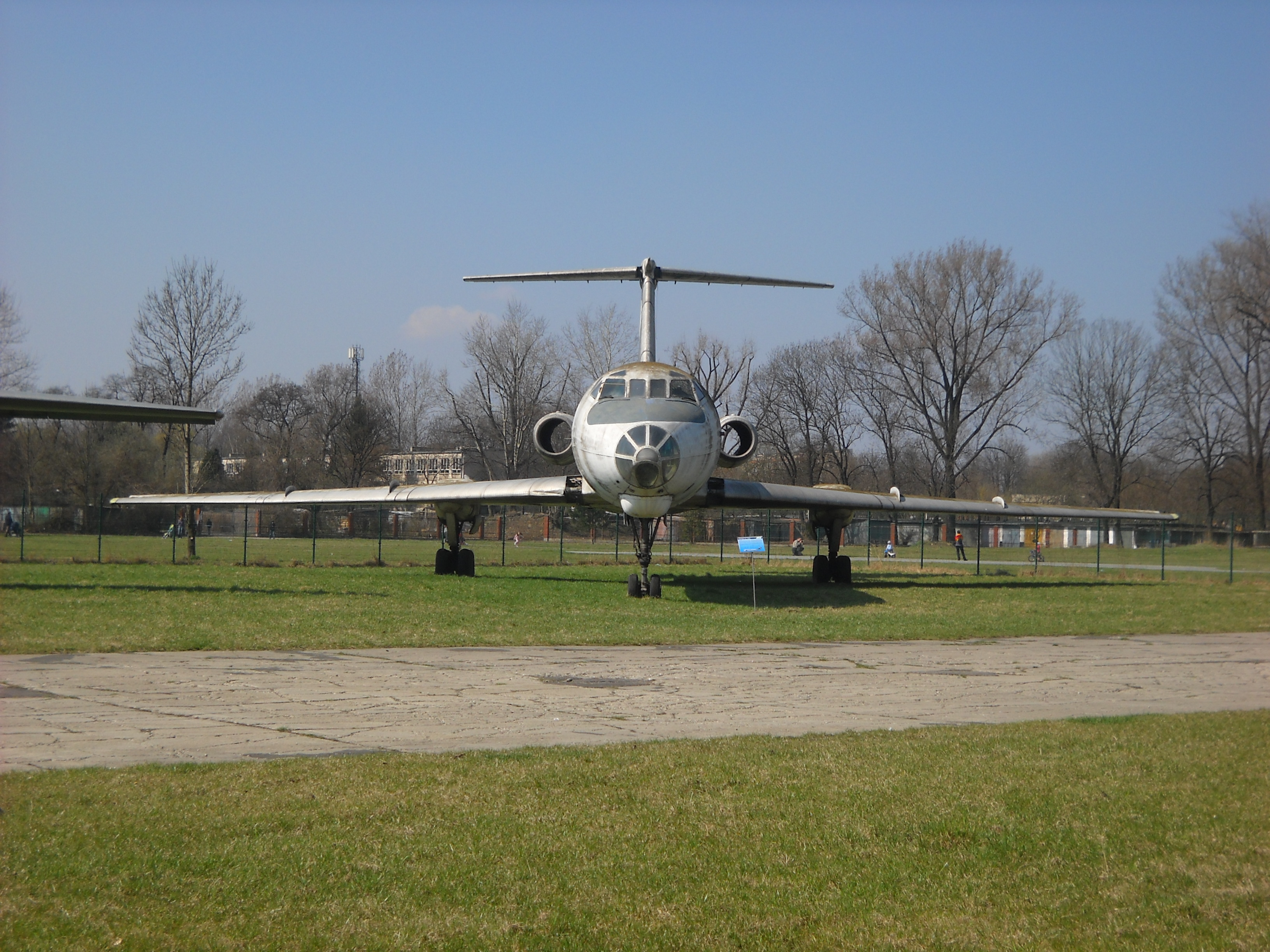
Tupolev Tu-134

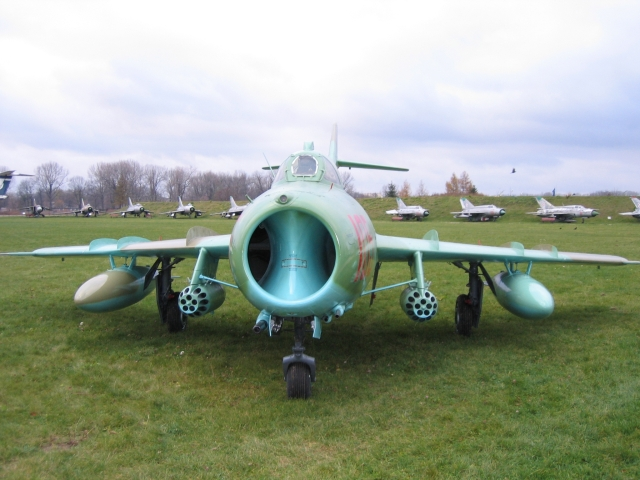
Lim-6bis in Museum (behind it - the "MiG alley")

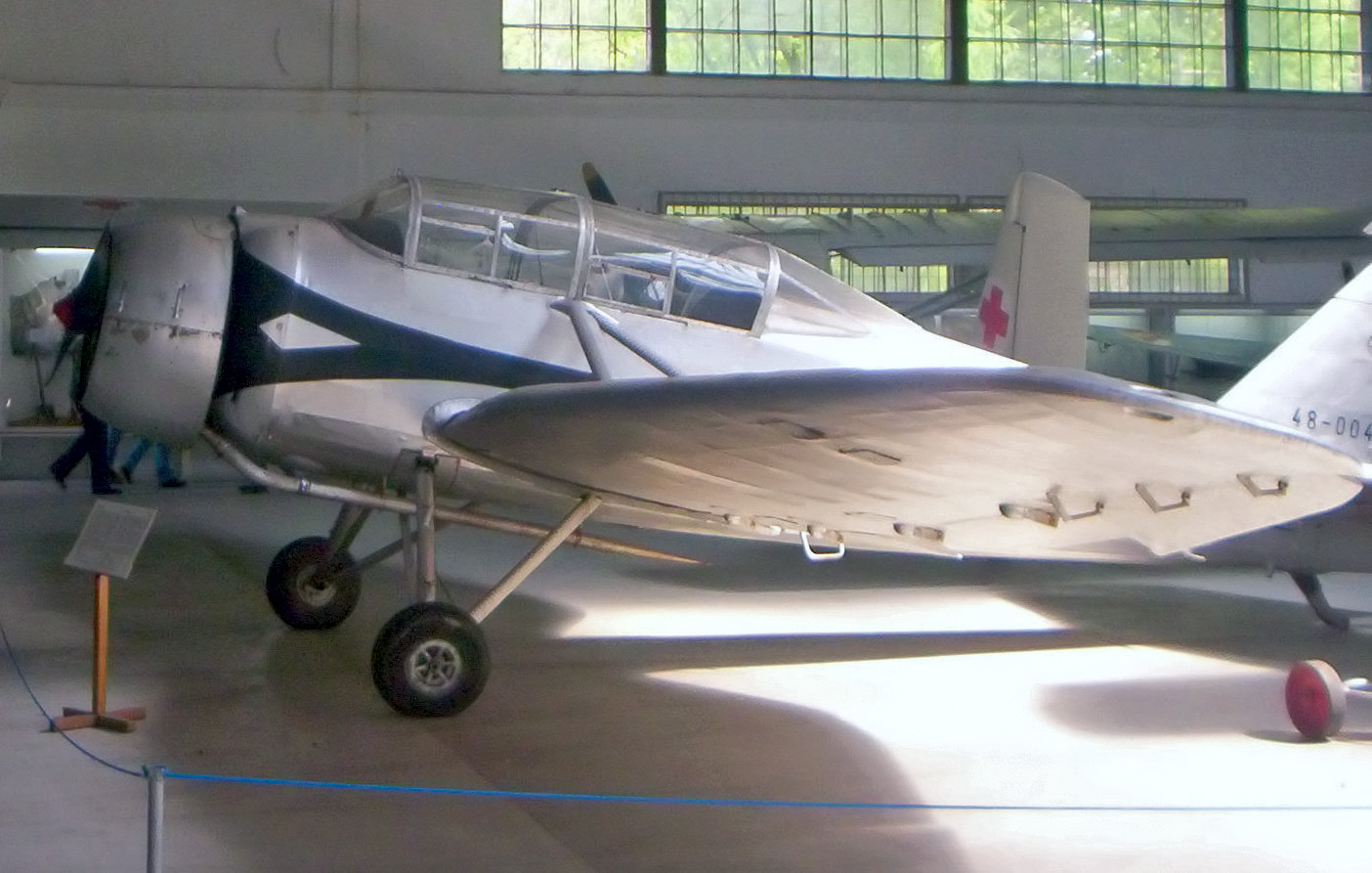
LWD Szpak-4T

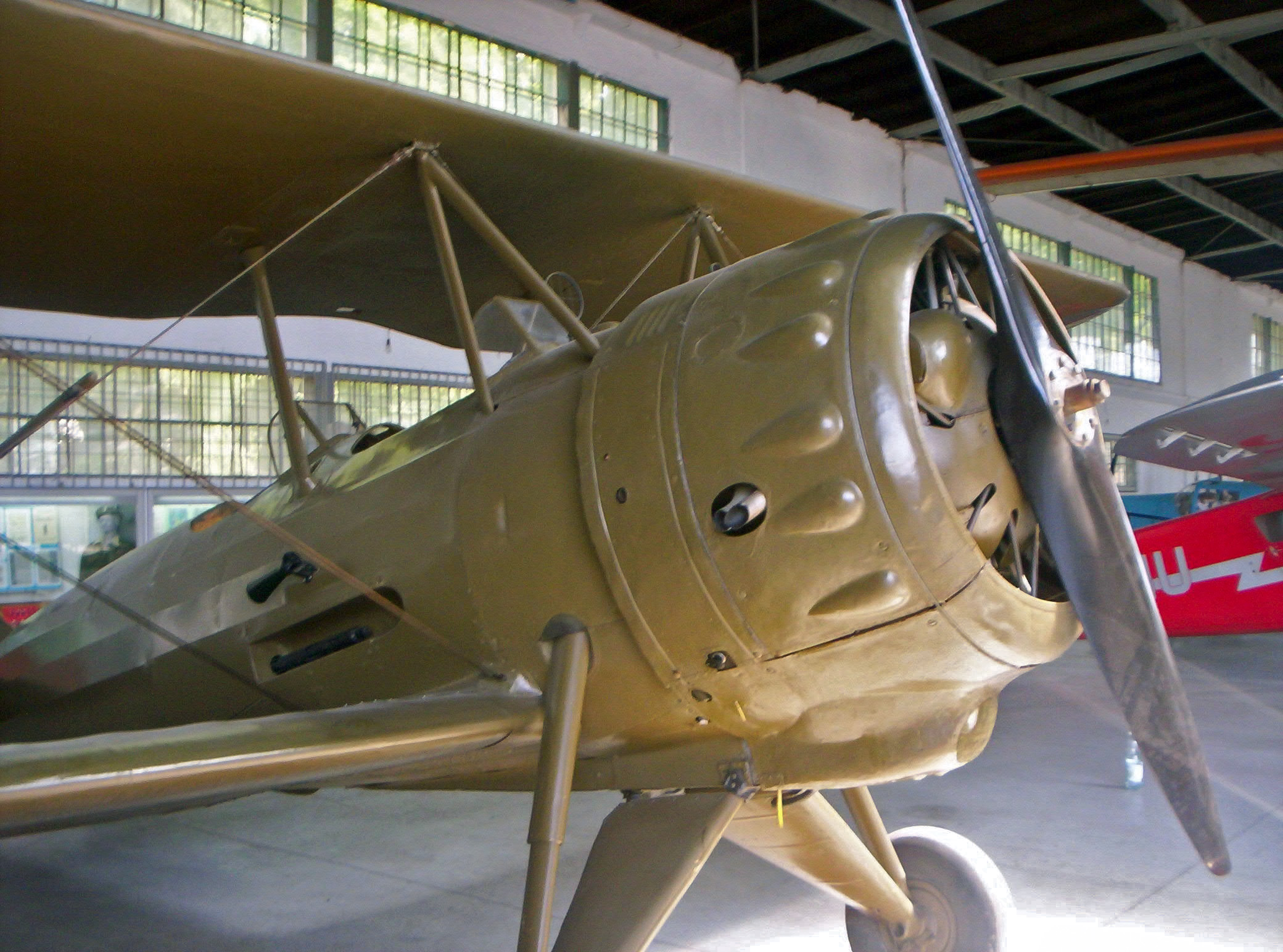
PWS-26

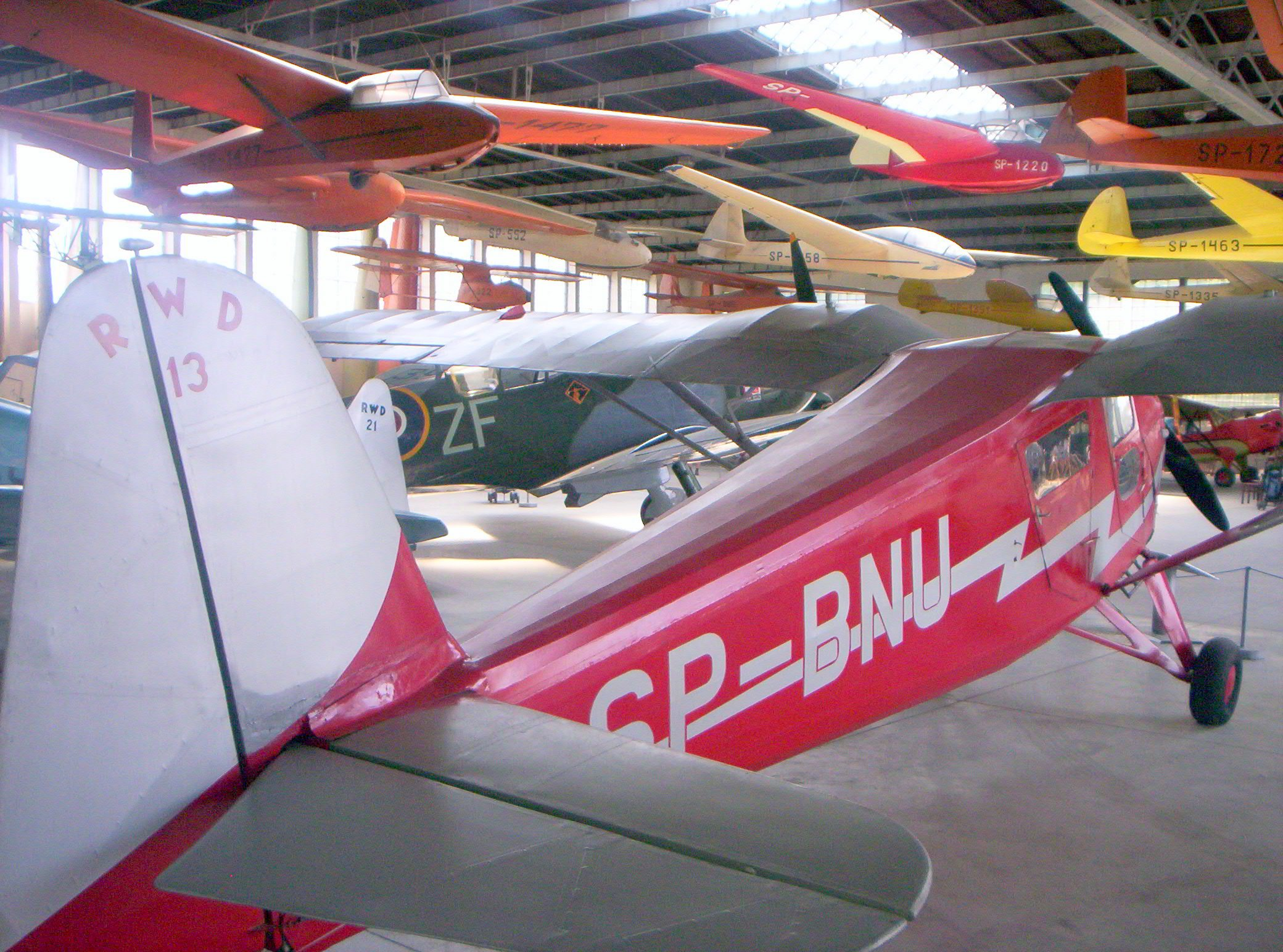
RWD-13

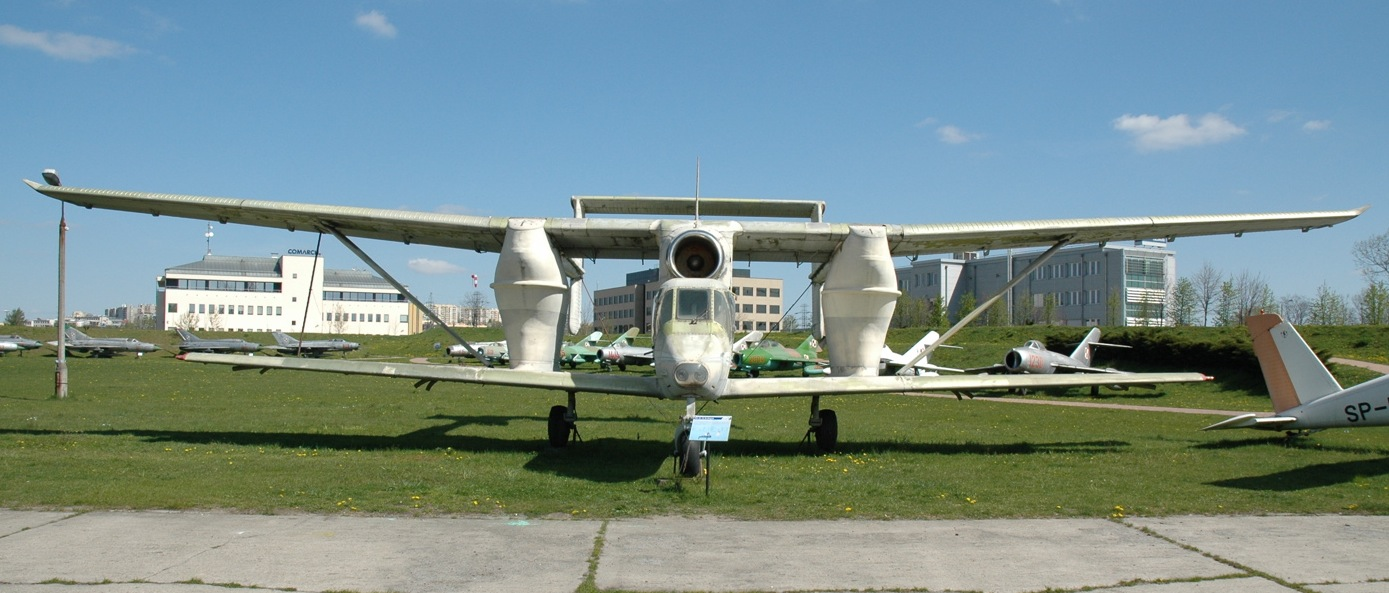
WSK-Mielec M-15 (Belphegor)

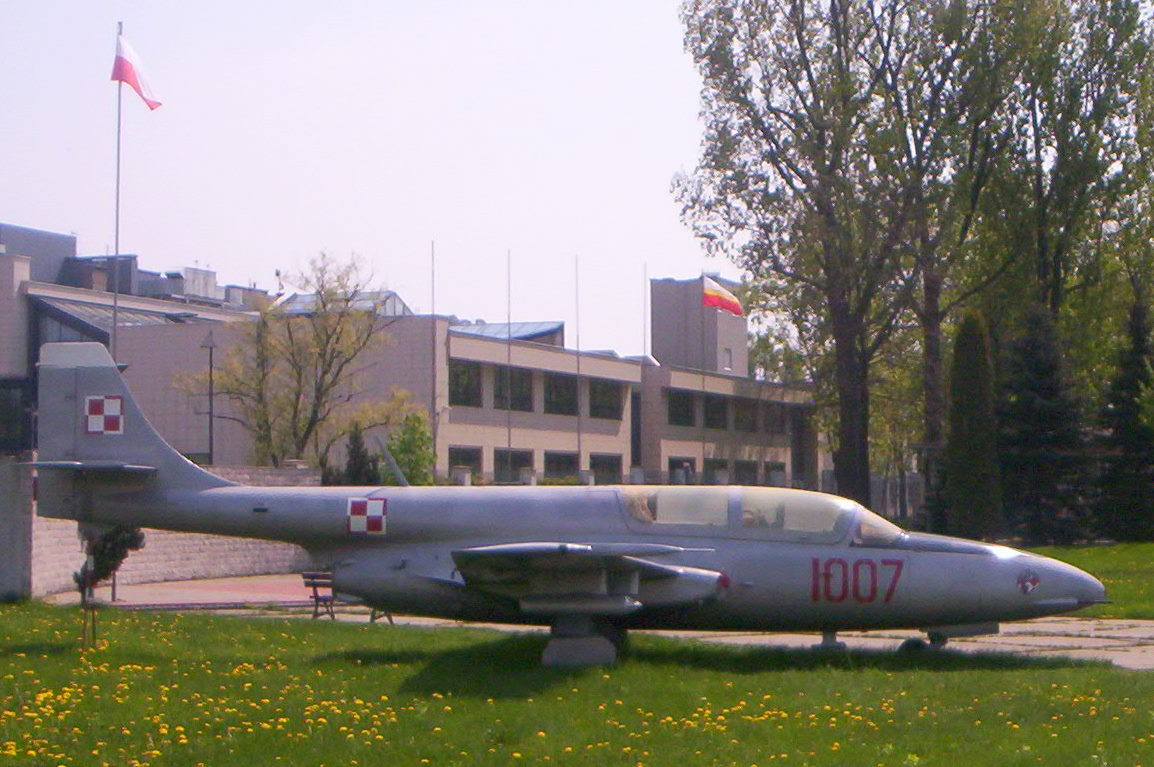
TS-11 Iskra

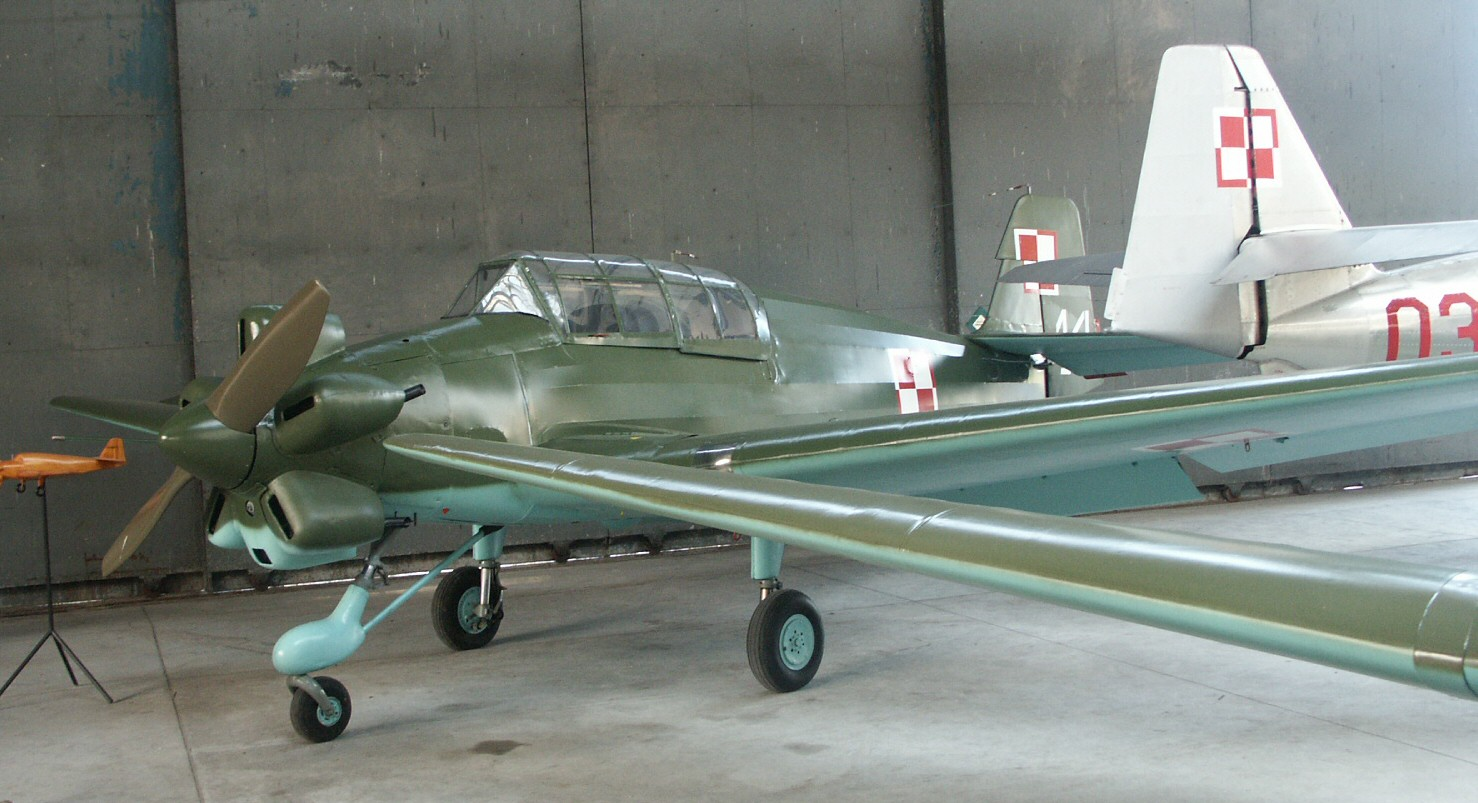
WSK TS-9 Junak 3

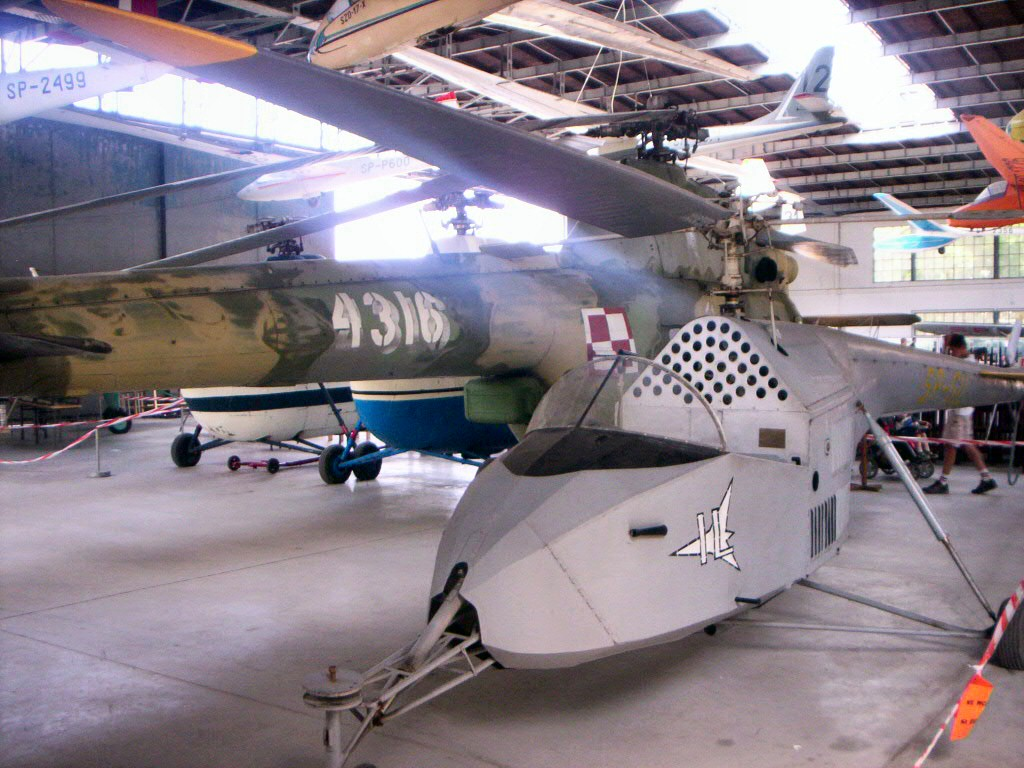
BŻ-1 GIL (SP-GIL)

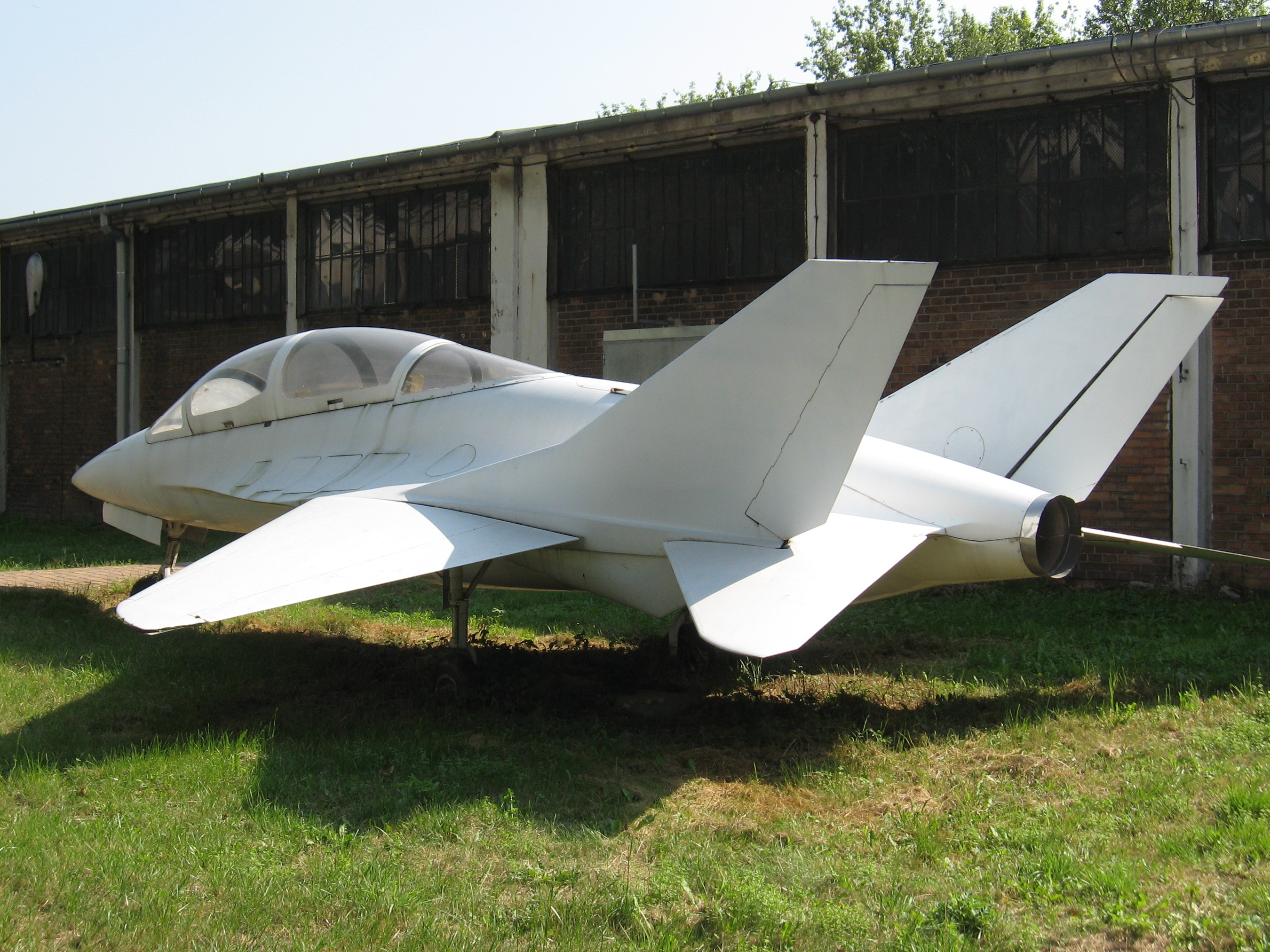
EM-10 Bielik

The Polish Aviation Museum (Polish: Muzeum Lotnictwa Polskiego w Krakowie) is a large museum of historic aircraft and aircraft engines in Kraków, Poland. It is located at the site of the no-longer functional Kraków-Rakowice-Czyżyny Airport. This airfield, established by Austria-Hungary in 1912, is one of the oldest in the world. The museum opened in 1964, after the airfield closed in 1963. It was listed among the world's best aviation museums by CNN.

For the first half century of its existence the museum used four hangars of the former airfield to display its exhibits. These buildings were not originally designed for this purpose and suffered from various inadequacies, notably insufficient heating in winter. The situation improved when a new main building for the museum opened on 18 September 2010.

== Book imprint ==
The Museum also functions as a publishing venue, in particular for dozens of books, photo albums, memoirs and brochures devoted to aviation history, including the subject of Polish design and manufacture of aircraft from before the invasion of Poland in 1939 and the post-1945 to the 1960s eras. Among its more popular books are the histories of 16 Polish squadrons in the Royal Air Force (RAF) during the Battle of Britain and the fight for Poland's independence during the First World War.

== Collection ==
The collection consists of over 200 aircraft as of 2005. Several of the aircraft displayed are unique on the world scale, including sailplanes and some 100 aircraft engines. Some of the exhibits are only in their initial stages. The museum houses a large aviation library and photographic archives.

The museum has 22 extremely rare airplanes that until 1941 were displayed at the Deutsche Luftfahrtsammlung museum (German aviation museum) in Berlin. These planes were evacuated during World War II to rescue them from Allied bombing (the museum itself was destroyed in air raids) to German-occupied Poland. The German Museum of Technology in Berlin regards these exhibits as their property. The restitution demand is especially directed to those of great significance to German aviation history. As of 2009 however, there was no sign that this would happen in the foreseeable future. Given the scale of destruction caused by German occupation in Poland between 1939–1945 and the recent German unwillingness to discuss reparation payments for Poland, it is likely this collection will remain in Polish hands.

The museum has very few Polish planes from the years 1918–1939, as these were almost all destroyed during the Nazi German occupation of Poland, including those displayed in Polish pre-war aviation museums. The only two examples of prewar Polish military aircraft in the collection: a PZL P.11 (the only surviving example in the world) and a PWS-26, survived only because they were displayed as war trophies by the Germans, and so were part of the above-mentioned collection acquired after the war. In addition, a few Polish pre-war civilian planes were returned by Romania after the war and eventually found their way to the museum.

In contrast, the museum has an essentially complete collection of all airplane types developed or used by Poland after 1945.

=== Fixed-wing motorized aircraft ===
- AEG Wagner Eule
- Aeritalia F-104S
- Aero Ae-145
- Aero L-60 Brigadýr
- Albatros B.II
- Albatros C.I (fuselage only)
- Albatros H.1 (fuselage only)
- Amiot AAC.1 Toucan (Junkers Ju 52/3m g10e)
- Antonov An-26
- Avia B.33 (Czech-built Ilyushin Il-10)
- Aviatik C.III (fuselage only)
- Bleriot XI (replica)
- Bücker Bü 131B Jungmann
- Caudron C.714
- Cessna A-37B Dragonfly
- Cessna UC-78A Bobcat
- Curtiss Export Hawk II
- Dassault Mirage 5
- de Havilland 82A Tiger Moth II
- De Havilland Vampire
- de Havilland Sea Venom FAW.21
- DFW C.V (fuselage only)
- EM-10 Bielik
- Farman IV (replica)
- Fouga CM.170 Magister
- Etrich Taube (1932 copy)
- Geest Möwe IV
- Grigorovich M-15
- Halberstadt CL.II (fuselage and central wing section)
- Hawker Siddeley Harrier GR.3
- Ilyushin Il-14S (VEB)
- Ilyushin Il-28R
- Ilyushin Il-28U
- Let L-200A Morava
- Levavasseur Antoinette (fuselage only)
- Lockheed F-104 Starfighter
- LTV A-7P Corsair II
- LFG Roland D.VI (fuselage only)
- Lisunov Li-2
- LVG B.II (incomplete)
- LWD Szpak-2
- LWD Żuraw
- The MAK - 30 supersonic flying target
- McDonnell Douglas F-4 Phantom II
- Messerschmitt Bf 109G-6 (temporary display)
- Messerschmitt Me 209V1 (fuselage only)
- Mikoyan-Gurevich MiG-19 PM
- Mikoyan-Gurevich MiG-21 F-13
- Mikoyan-Gurevich MiG-21 MF
- Mikoyan-Gurevich MiG-21 bis
- Mikoyan-Gurevich MiG-21 PF
- Mikoyan-Gurevich MiG-21 PFM
- Mikoyan-Gurevich MiG-21 R
- Mikoyan-Gurevich MiG-21 U
- Mikoyan-Gurevich MiG-21 UM
- Mikoyan-Gurevich MiG-21 US
- Mikoyan-Gurevich MiG-23 MF
- Mikoyan MiG-29 UB
- North American T-6G Texan
- Northrop F-5E Tiger II
- Pieniążek "Kukułka"
- Piper L-4A Grasshopper
- Polikarpov Po-2 LNB
- PWS-26
- PZL M-4 Tarpan
- PZL M-15 Belphegor
- PZL MD-12
- PZL P.11c
- PZL S-4 Kania 3
- PZL Szpak 4T
- PZL TS-8 Bies
- PZL TS-11 Iskra bis B
- PZL-104 Wilga
- PZL-105 Flaming
- PZL-106A Kruk
- PZL-130 Orlik
- Republic F-84F Thunderstreak
- Republic F-105 Thunderchief
- RWD-13
- RWD-21
- Saab J 35J Draken
- Saab AJSF 37 Viggen
- SABCA Mirage 5BA
- SEPECAT Jaguar GR.1
- Sopwith F.1 Camel
- Stinson L-5 Sentinel (fuselage only)
- Sukhoi Su-7 BKL
- Sukhoi Su-7 BM
- Sukhoi Su-7 UM
- Sukhoi Su-20
- Sukhoi Su-22 M4
- Supermarine Spitfire LF Mk XVIE
- Tupolev Tu-134A
- Tupolev Tu-2S
- WSK Lim-1
- WSK Lim-2
- WSK Lim-5
- WSK Lim-6bis
- WSK Lim-6M
- WSK Lim-6MR
- WSK SB Lim-2
- WSK SB Lim-2A
- WSK TS-9 Junak 3
- Yakovlev Yak-11
- Yakovlev Yak-12
- Yakovlev Yak-17UTI (Jak-17W)
- Yakovlev Yak-18
- Yakovlev Yak-23
- Yakovlev Yak-40
- Zlin Z-26 Trener

The Museum also possesses some other incomplete aircraft and some stored.

=== Gliders ===
- IS-1 Sęp bis
- IS-3 ABC
- IS-4 Jastrząb
- IS-A Salamandra
- IS-B Komar 49
- IS-C Żuraw
- S-1 Swift
- SZD-6x Nietoperz
- SZD-8bis Jaskółka
- SZD-9 bis Bocian 1A
- SZD-10bis Czapla
- SZD-12 Mucha 100
- SZD-15 Sroka
- SZD-17x Jaskółka L
- SZD-18 Czajka
- SZD-19 Zefir
- SZD-21 Kobuz 3
- SZD-22 Mucha Standard
- SZD-25A Lis
- SZD-43 Orion
- Warsztaty Szybowcowe Wrona-bis
- W.W.S.2_Żaba

More gliders in temporary storage.

=== Motor gliders ===
- HWL Pegaz

=== Helicopters ===
- Aérospatiale Alouette III
- Bell CH-136 (Canadian Bell OH-58 Kiowa)
- BŻ-1 GIL
- BŻ-4 Żuk
- JK-1 Trzmiel
- Mil Mi-4 A
- Mil Mi-4 ME
- Mil Mi-8 S
- Mil Mi-24
- WSK Mi-2 URP
- Saunders-Roe Skeeter AOP.12
- WSK Mi-2 Ch
- WSK SM-1 (licence Mil Mi-1)
- WSK SM-2

=== Engines ===
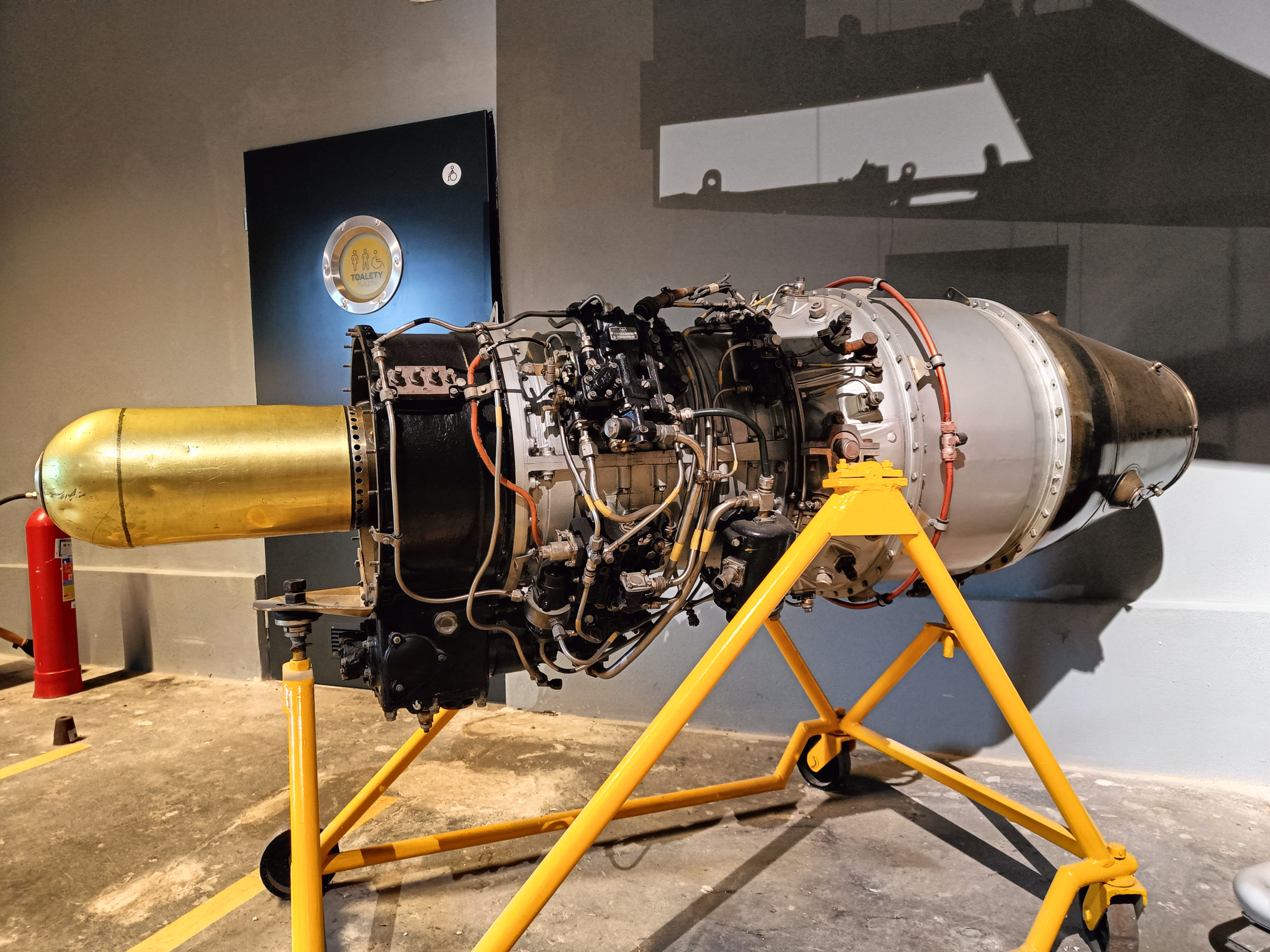
turbojet engine SO-1

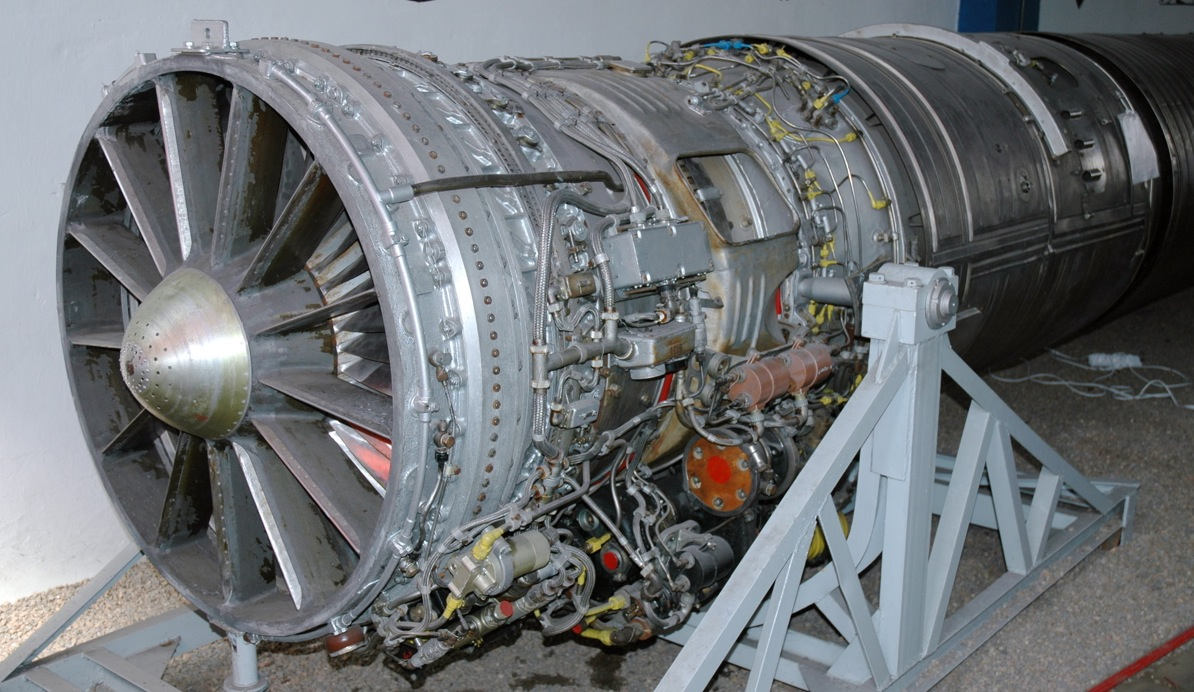
turbojet engine Lyulka AL-7F

- AI-14R
- AI-24WT
- Alfa Romeo 126 RC 34
- Argus As 10c
- Argus As 410
- Argus As 5
- Argus As 7
- Argus As 8
- Armstrong Siddeley Genet
- Austro-Daimler DM 200
- Avia M-332
- Avia M-337
- Benz Bz.IVd
- BMW 132 Z
- BMW 801 D2
- BMW IIIa
- Bramo 323 Fafnir
- Breda (lic. SPA 6a)
- Bristol Cherub I
- Bristol Pegasus X
- Clerget Blin 9B
- Daimler-Benz DB 600 G
- Farman 12 WE
- Farman 9 EFR
- Gnome-Rhône 9KRd Mistral
- Gnome-Rhône 9Ab Jupiter
- GTD-350
- Hirth HM 504A
- Hirth HM 508
- Hirth HM 60R
- Hispano-Suiza 12X
- Hispano-Suiza 82
- Isotta Fraschini Bianchi V 4B
- Junkers Jumo 205
- Junkers Jumo 211
- Junkers L 8
- Klimov M-103
- Klimov VK-105 PF
- Le Rhône 9
- Liberty L-12
- LIT-3 (lic. Ivchenko AI-26)
- Lorraine-Dietrich 12 EB
- Lyulka AL-7F
- Maybach HSLU
- Maybach Mb.IV
- Mercedes Benz F-7502
- Mercedes D.IIIa
- Mercedes D.IVa
- Mercedes D IVb
- Mercedes E 4F
- Mikulin AM-34
- Mikulin AM-35A
- Mikulin M-42
- Mikulin AM-38F
- NAG C.III
- Praga Doris 208B
- Pratt & Whitney Twin Wasp
- PZInż. Junior
- PZInż. Major Typ 4
- PZL Pegaz II
- PZL Pegaz VIII
- PZL WN-3
- R-11
- R-13
- R-27
- RAF 3A Napier
- RAF 4A Daimler
- RD-10A
- RD-500
- RD-9B
- Renault 12FE
- Renault 6Q11
- Rolls-Royce Eagle Mk IX
- Rolls-Royce Kestrel II S
- Rolls-Royce Merlin Mk XX
- 9D21
- R-11 Zemlya (SCUD)
- Salmson 9 AD
- Salmson Z-9
- Siemens-Halske Sh 14
- Wójcicki's ramjet engine
- Sunbeam Mohawk
- Shvetsov ASh-21
- Shvetsov ASh-62 IR
- Shvetsov ASh-82 FN
- Shvetsov M-11 D
- Shvetsov M-11 FR
- Walter HWK 109-501
- Walter HWK 109-507
- Walter Minor 4-III
- Walter Mistral K-14
- Wright R-2600-23 Cyclone 14
- Wright Whirlwind R-975
- WSK Lis-2
- WSK NP-1
- WSK SO-1

== See also ==
- Culture of Kraków
- List of aerospace museums
