= Bronisław Żurakowski =

Polish engineer, aeroplane constructor, and glider test pilot (1911–2009)

Bronisław Żurakowski (26 June 1911 – 4 October 2009) was a Polish engineer, aeroplane constructor, and glider test pilot.

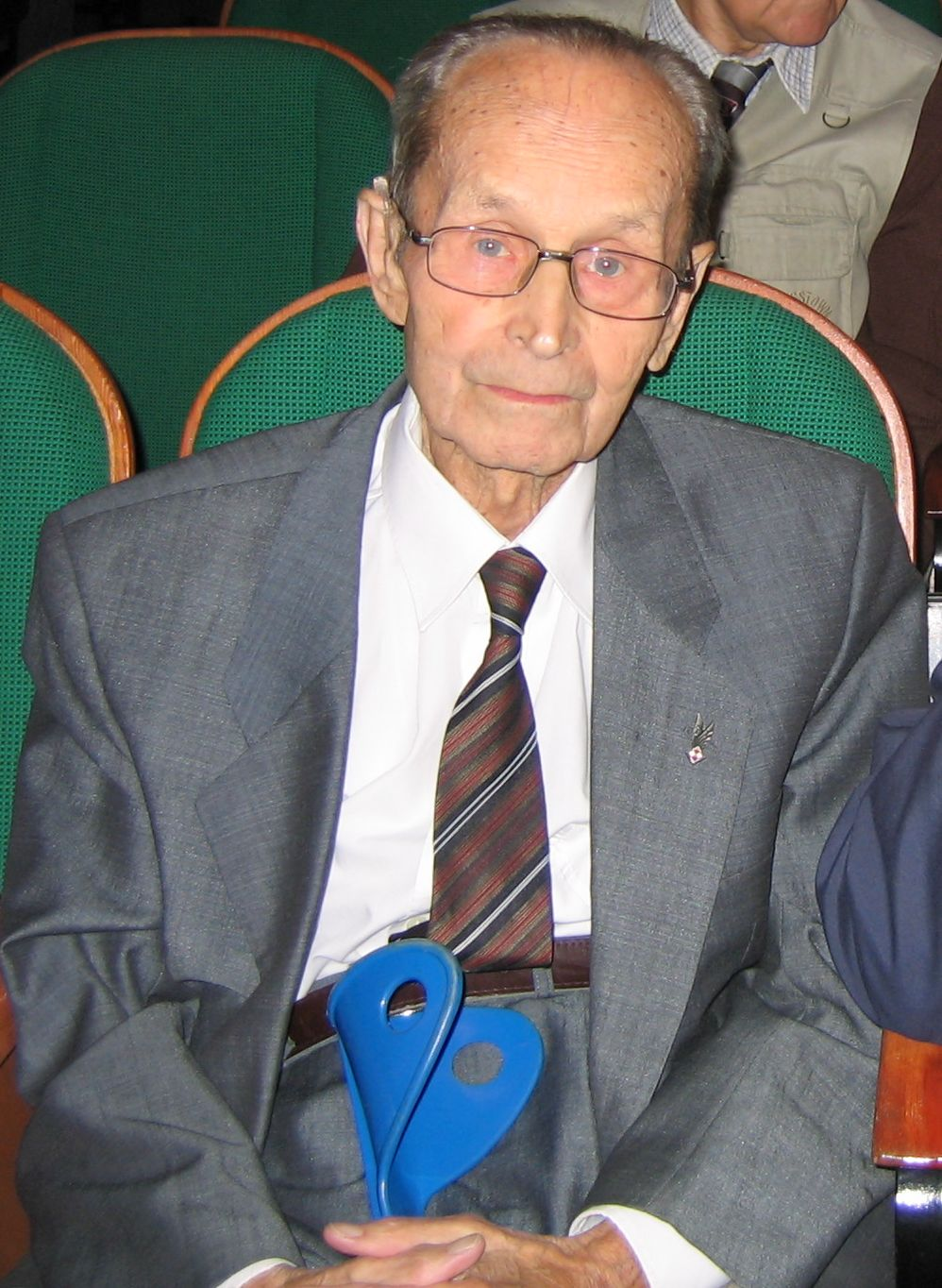
Bronisław Żurakowski in 2007

== Personal life ==
Bronisław Żurakowski was born in Makiejowka. He was a brother of test pilot Janusz Żurakowski. Żurakowski died on October 4th, 2009.

== Career ==
Before the Second World War Żurakowski worked in the RWD bureau, where he designed aircraft RWD-17, RWD-17W, RWD-20 and made calculations for RWD-16bis, RWD-21 and RWD-23. After the war he designed the first Polish helicopter BŻ-1 GIL and later a helicopter BŻ-4 Żuk (both designated BŻ for his initials). He was a co-designer of a successful utility plane PZL-104 Wilga.
