= Yakovlev Yak-10 =

Soviet liaison aircraft

Yak-10

General information
- Type: Utility aircraft
- National origin: Soviet Union
- Manufacturer: Yakovlev
- Number built: 40+

History
- First flight: 1944
- Developed from: Yakovlev AIR-6

The Yakovlev Yak-10 (Russian: Яковлев Як-10) was a Soviet light liaison aircraft designed and built by the Yakovlev design bureau in the 1940s.

== Design and development ==
In the late 1940s the Soviet forces had a need for a light liaison aircraft that was smaller than the Antonov An-2. The company derived two four-seat aircraft with wooden wings and metal fuselages, from the earlier AIR-6. The Yak-10, a high-wing strut-braced monoplane with fixed landing gear and the Yak-13 a low-wing cantilever monoplane with a manually retractable landing gear. Both aircraft were powered by a 145 hp M-11MF radial engine. After tests in 1945, the Yak-10 was awarded a production contract for 40 aircraft, despite unimpressive performance. The company built a number of different variants but soon produced an improved design, the Yak-12, which, although of similar layout, was not a derivative of the Yak-10.

The Yak-10 only entered limited production before it was replaced by the superior Yakovlev Yak-12, and although the Yak-13 proved to be superior to the original Yak-10, production was not carried out.

== Variants ==
Yak-10
Strut-braced high-wing monoplane powered by a Shvetsov M-11MF radial engine.
Yak-10G
Floatplane variant with twin floats.
Yak-10S
Ambulance variant with room for one stretcher.
Yak-10V
Dual control.
Yak-13
Low-wing monoplane derivative, using an almost identical fuselage and Shvetsov M-11MF engine installation, with a cantilevered wooden low wing for direct comparison with the Yak-10. One built.

== Specifications (Yak-10) ==
Data from The Osprey Encyclopaedia of Russian Aircraft 1875 – 1995

General characteristics

- Crew: one
- Capacity: three passengers
- Length: 8.45 m (27 ft 8.63 in)
- Wingspan: 12.0 m (39 ft 4.5 in)
- Wing area: 22.0 m^{2} (237 sq ft)
- Empty weight: 820 kg (1,808 lb)
- Gross weight: 1,250 kg (2,756 lb)
- Powerplant: 1 × Shvetsov M-11FR radial engine , 119 kW (160 hp)

Performance

- Maximum speed: 206 km/h (128 mph, 111 kn)
- Range: 605 km (376 mi, 327 nmi)
- Service ceiling: 3,500 m (11,480 ft)
- Rate of climb: 3.0 m/s (600 ft/min)

== See also ==
Aircraft of comparable role, configuration, and era

- de Havilland Canada DHC-2 Beaver
- Yakovlev Yak-12
- PZL-101 Gawron
