= PZL-104 Wilga =

Utility aircraft family by PZL Warszawa-Okęcie built 1962-2006

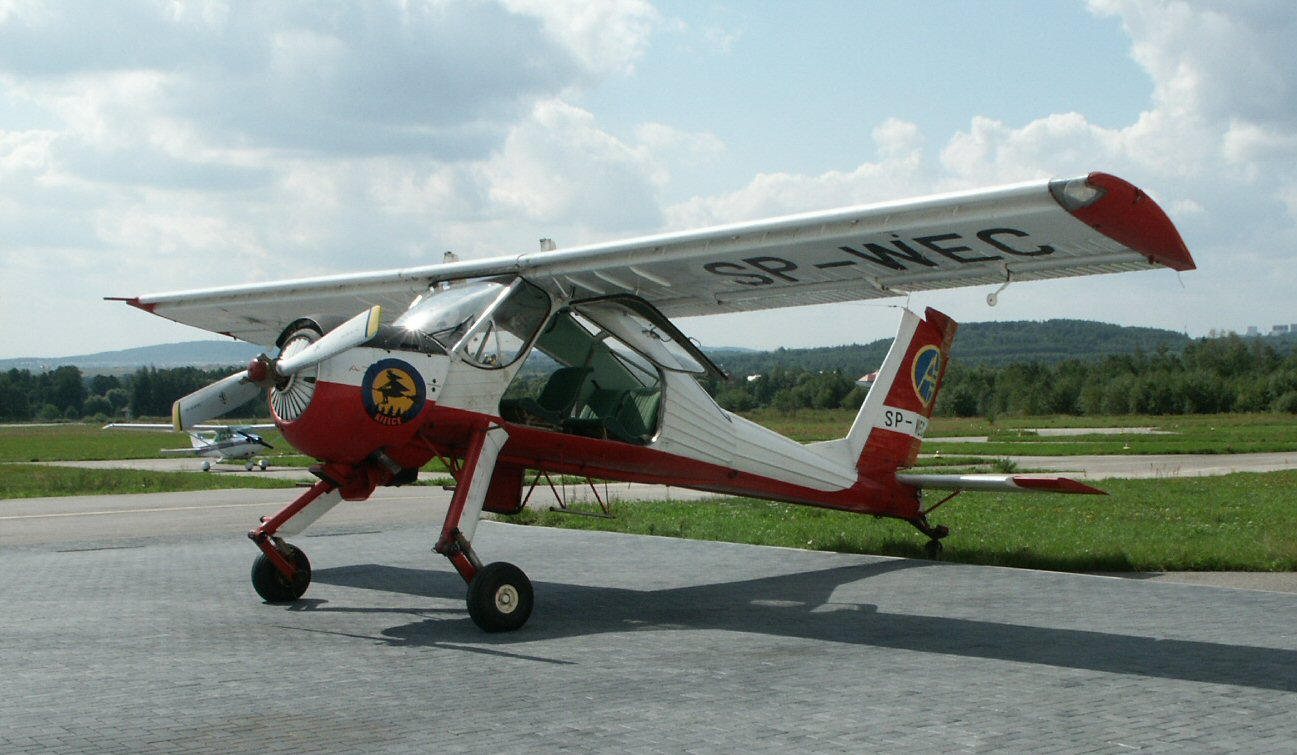
- PZL-104 Wilga 35

General information
- Type: Utility aircraft
- National origin: Poland
- Manufacturer: PZL Warszawa-Okęcie
- Status: Production Ended
- Primary user: Polish military and civilian aviation
- Number built: 1,000+

History
- Manufactured: 1962-2006
- First flight: 24 April 1962

PZL-104 Wilga (golden oriole) is a Polish short-takeoff-and-landing (STOL) civil aviation utility aircraft designed and originally manufactured by PZL Warszawa-Okęcie, and later by European Aeronautic Defence and Space Company (EADS), who had acquired the original manufacturer during 2001.

First flown on 24 April 1962 and entering service during the following year, the Wilga has evolved through many ever-improving versions during its continuous production from 1962 to 2006. The type was largely used by civil operators; those military air services that did fly the type typically used it as a trainer and liaison aircraft. In excess of 1,000 aircraft were produced prior to European Aeronautic Defence and Space Company (EADS) announcing on their website that production of the Wilga would cease in 2006.

== Development ==
=== Origins ===
The PZL-104 was designed for robust use in sports and civil aviation, with a strong emphasis on glider-towing and parachute training. On 24 April 1962, the prototype of the initial Wilga Mark 1 variant made the type's first flight, powered by an existing Polish 220 hp (160 kW) horizontally-opposed engine, the PZL WN-6RB. The subsequent flight test programme with the prototype exposed a number of design faults, the most serious of which was the airframe's excessive weight and a rear view restriction that prevented the crew from easily seeing a towed glider. Accordingly, an airframe review was performed by the design team that resulted in the thorough redevelopment of the aircraft, led by Polish aeronautical engineers Bronisław Żurakowski and Andrzej Frydrychewicz.

While the major structural elements and sub-assemblies which had been deemed to have been successful, such as the structure of the wings, were retained from the initial design, the redeveloped aircraft featured a completely new fuselage that was both slimmer and considerably strengthened beyond its prior counterpart; this new airframe also offered an excellent rear view aspect for the crew during glider towing operations, while the side doors were also re-engineered to open upwards for better aero observation or parachute jump sorties. If required, the aircraft could be flown with the doors open. It also featured an air ambulance cabin conversion capability.

On 1 August 1963, the revised aircraft, which was designated as the PZL-104 Wilga Mark 2, conducted its first flight. While testing validated the qualities of the Wilga 2's airframe and had proved the aircraft to be a successful design, the WN-6RB engine that powered the model was not fully developed and thus, the aircraft did not enter serial production. In response, the decision was taken to convert the assembly line to instead manufacture the improved Wilga C and Wilga Mark 3 configurations instead. On 30 December 1963, the Wilga C (or Wilga Mark 2 Subvariant C) made its first flight; this variant which was a dedicated export model of the type for Indonesia powered by the imported North American -certified 225 hp (168 kW) horizontally opposed Continental O-470 engine.

To address the immaturity of the original WN-6RB engine, the design team decided to adopt an in-production radial engine, the 260 hp (190 kW) Ivchenko AI-14R; furnished with this engine, the aircraft became the PZL-104 Wilga Mark 3 variant, which first flew on 31 December 1965. The new engine was more powerful but it spoilt the previously clean and aerodynamic fuselage lines, originally designed for a flat engine; nonetheless, the new variant was successful. Due in combination to the power of the AI-14R engine and the STOL capability of the airframe, an extraordinary high rate of climb of 11 m/s (2,165 fpm) (maximum) under minimal load was possible. One of a few remaining flaws was that the engine was relatively uneconomical to operate.

=== Further development ===
The Wilga 32 was an improved small-series export variant of the type, powered by a Continental flat engine, which was also locally produced in Indonesia as the "Gelatik". After completing an initial batch of 13 Wilga 3s, there were some improvements made to the model, most notably the landing gear base being increased from 2.12 to 2.83 m (7.0 to 9.3 ft) to improve stability during takeoff runs. On 29 June 1967, an improved model, designated as the PZL-104 Wilga 35, made its first flight, it subsequently entered mass production as well. The most numerous variant of Wilga 35 was the utility plane Wilga 35A, while most others were built in small numbers or remained as prototypes alone.

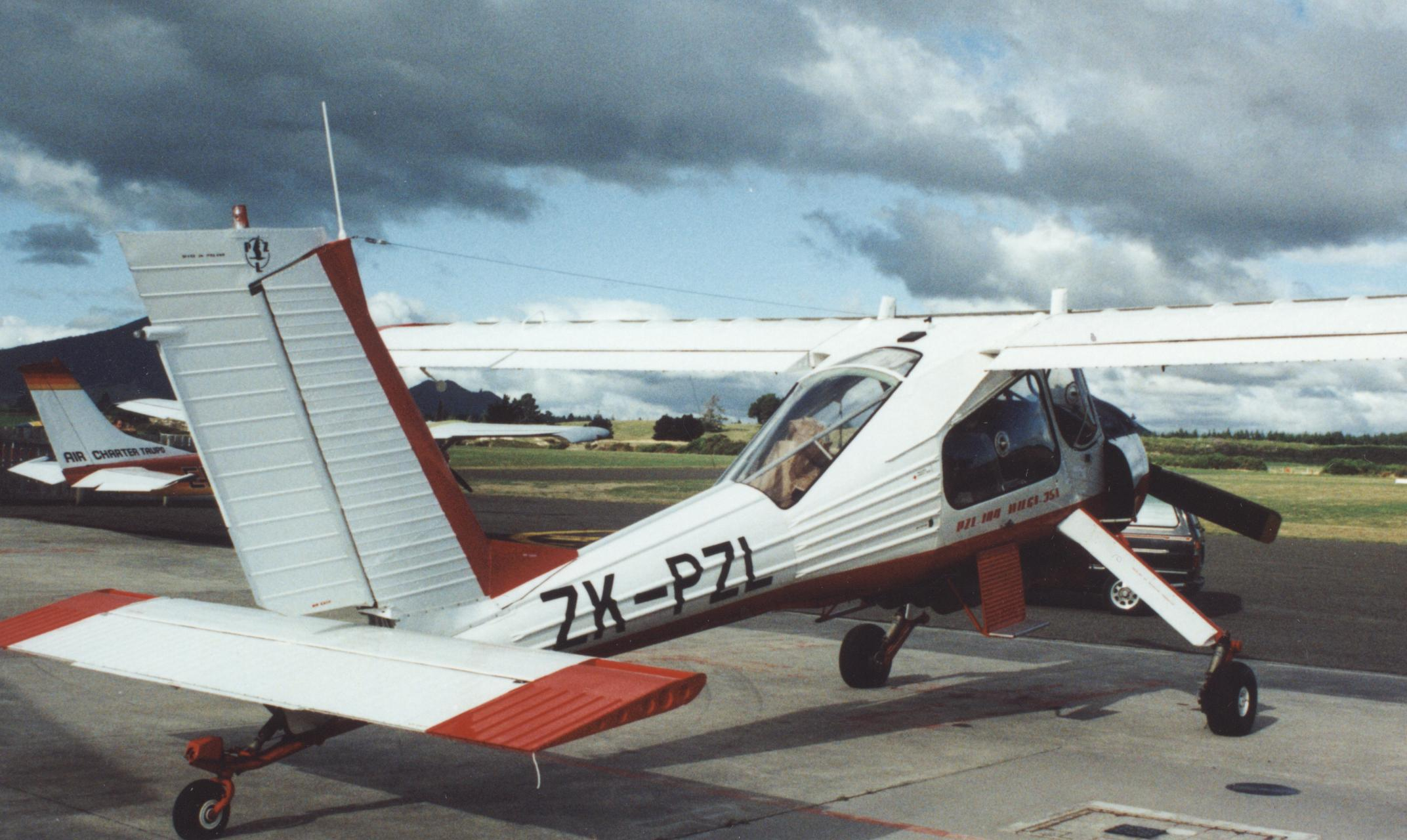
PZL 104 Wilga 35A at Taupō airfield, New Zealand, in February 1992 showing rear cabin glazing arrangement

During 1979, the Wilga 80 variant went into production, which was an improved model specifically certified to operate in the US market. During the late 1990s, California-based Wilga dealer Terra-San, promoted their own self-developed special mission variant of the Wilga 80. This customised derivative, which was marketed as an alternative to helicopters in the law enforcement role, was furnished with a Wescam-built gimbal-mounted camera and infrared imaging system fixed to the exterior of the fuselage's centre-line. In January 1996, it was announced that PZL intended to offer an armed version of the Wilga, intended to perform border patrol and counter-insurgency missions. The basic configuration of the aircraft was principally changed by the addition of a pair of under-wing hardpoints capable of carrying gun pods, along with both unguided or guided rockets.

In 1996, it was announced that PZL had developed an improved version of the aircraft, known as the PZL-104MA Wilga 2000. The Wilga 2000 family benefitted from various improvements, it adopted an American Lycoming O-540 engine, capable of generating a maximum of 225 kW (300 hp), along with an AlliedSignal-Bendix avionics suite and a new wing, the latter of which offered increased fuel capacity and endurance, as well with aerodynamic refinements, such as fairings around the undercarriage. In May 2004, Canadian-based company Sealand Aviation demonstrated an amphibious version of the Wilga 2000 in Anchorage.

During July 1995, PZL and Brazilian aircraft manufacturer Embraer signed a co-operation agreement, involving the latter conducting the marketing of Polish general aviation aircraft such as the Wilga, in the Brazilian market in exchange for the sale of Embraer EMB 120 Brasilia regional airliners to Poland.

=== EADS and production shutdown ===
During September 2001, it was announced that Poland had finalised an agreement with the multinational aerospace conglomerate European Aeronautic Defence and Space Company (EADS) to acquire 51 per cent of PZL Warszawa-Okecie for 28.5 million zloty ($6.74 million), which later rose up to 85 per cent ownership of the company. At the time, EADS commented that it intended to market the company's current products, including the Wilga, as well as retaining the workforce at the current numbers and promising to finance the costs of modernising the Warsaw-based manufacturer's facilities. According to Ignacio Alonso Recarte, senior vice-president commercial for EADS-CASA's military transport aircraft division, the firm was studying options for marketing PZL's existing aircraft.

During 2003, negotiations were underway on the topic of creating an integrated light aircraft company between EADS-CASA and EADS-SOCATA, under which a combined market for general aviation and business aircraft was to incorporate EADS PZL's own range while the Polish factory would produce elements of all SOCATA-built aircraft. In early 2004, EADS CASA openly declared its intentions to market the Wilga 2000 towards the North American law enforcement market, and that it was working with distributors to develop a capable airborne surveillance capability for the type, including forward-looking infrared (FLIR) and colour cameras.

For a time during the 2000s, a Canadian aircraft supplier was reportedly seriously considered building the Wilga aircraft for the nation's Air Cadet league, observing its complete compliance with glider training requirements and the need to procure further aircraft at that time. However, the company was unable to acquire the necessary support of EADS to proceed on the proposed Canadian manufacturing venture involving the Wilga.

During November 2006, production of the Wilga came to end following a decision by EADS to reduce its presence within the civil aviation market, the firm also attributed the termination to be a consequence of a lack of internal resources and high associated costs. At the time, it was stated that proposals to transfer Wilga production to North America were being evaluated. According to aerospace publication Flight International, the programme's cessation was largely a surprise to the company's own international dealers, many of which have reported a relatively strong demand for the four-seat aircraft at the time. Throughout its production life, in excess of 1,000 Wilgas of all types had been constructed, the vast majority (reportedly around 935) of these were built to the Wilga 35 and 80 standards. These numbers mean that the PZL-104 has been produced in greater quantity than any other Polish aircraft design in history.

In September 2024 Airbus Poland and Draco Aircraft, set up by former Airbus Poland's CEO Johannes von Thadden, signed an agreement to transfer all intellectual property rights and the type certificate for Wilga to Draco Aircraft. Draco Aircraft, in cooperation with Mike Patey, wants to bring the aircraft to the market in a modernized version, called 'Draco'. Currently the company is looking for investors. An important step was taken in May 2025 when Draco Aircraft was chosen by a new European Union and European Defence Fund (EDF) program, called 'European Union Defence Innovation Scheme' (EUDIS) as one of only 39 high tech startups throughout Europe.

== Design ==
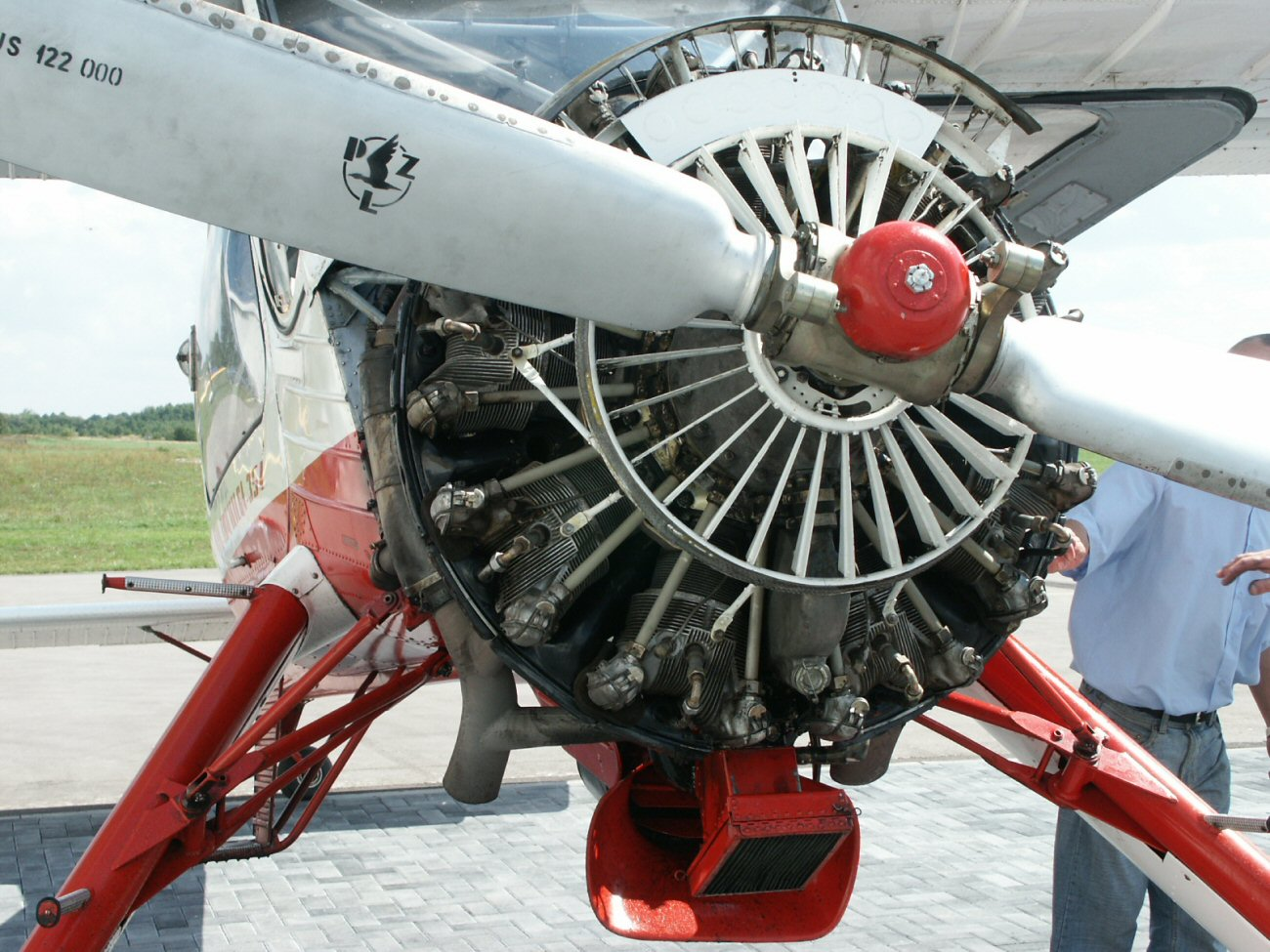
Head-on view of the forward section of a Wilga

The PZL-104 Wilga is a high-wing cantilever short-takeoff-and-landing (STOL) monoplane utility aircraft, featuring all-aluminium construction and a conventional layout. The main cabin is constructed of duralumin, both riveted and corrugated, which reportedly increases the strength and durability of the aircraft's low-mass semi-monocoque fuselage. The rectangular single-spar wing is fitted with slotted flaps and anti-stall slats. The four-seat cabin is fitted with two large side doors, opening upwards to facilitate large loads, and rapid entry/exit. The main wheels of the landing gear are attached to an articulated, conventional fixed undercarriage, complete with pneumatic shock absorbers and paired with a heavy-duty sprung tail wheel, which was attached to a hook for towing gliders.

Early aircraft were typically powered by the Soviet-designed Ivchenko AI-14R radial engine, which was capable of generating up to 260 hp (190 kW); notably, the engine rotates in the opposite direction to North American standards. The Al-14R would normally drive a two-bladed composite wooden propeller, which was strengthened with bonded metal sections fitted along their leading edges. The newest models of the Wilga have been furnished with fully metal propellers and are powered by the North American Continental O-470 engine, which rotate in the opposite direction to the earlier Soviet engine. Other engines from other manufacturers have also been adapted to power the type. Regardless of the engine fitted, fuel is primarily housed within a pair of 195 L (43 imp gal; 52 US gal) fuel tanks, which were located within the aircraft's wings.

== Operational history ==
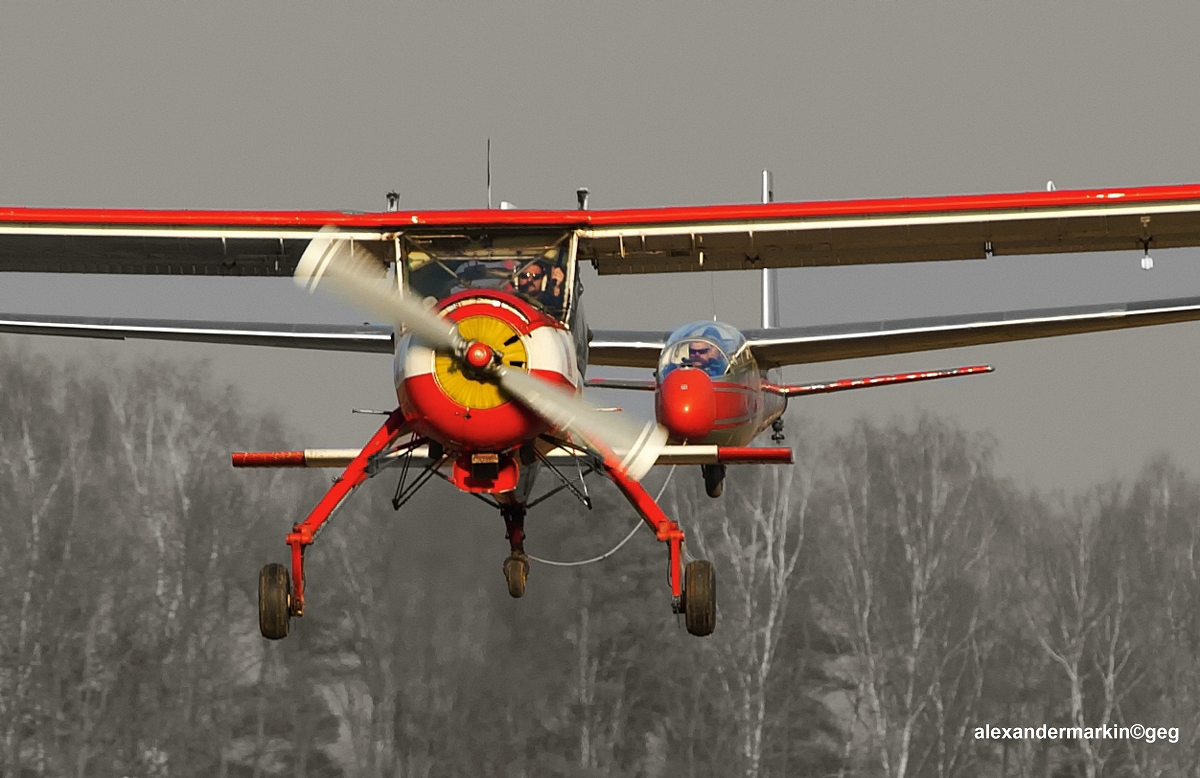
A Wilga towing a LET L-13 Blanik sailplane

The Wilga has been widely used in civil aviation circles; it has often been tasked with performing various duties, such as touring, observation, glider towing, parachute training and bush flying. In Poland, the type has formed the longtime backbone contingent of the Polish Aero Club, who operate the aircraft in a basic configuration for flight training. Additionally, a number of Polish pilots that have flown Wilgas have been awarded several prizes in the FAI World Rally Flying and Precision Flying Championships across a wide range of dates, from 1978 to 2006.

In military service, the type has been typically used to perform liaison and recovery missions, as well as being used as a light observation platform.

== Variants ==
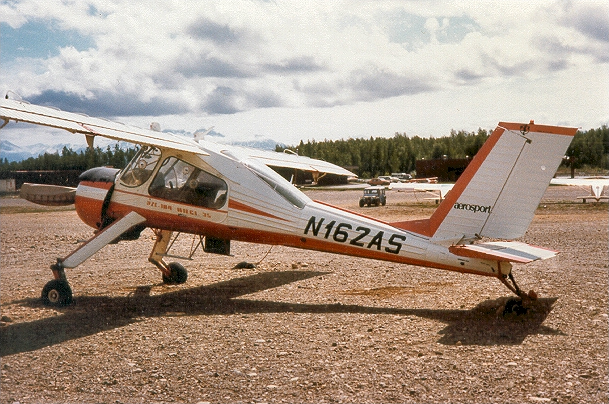
PZL-104 Wilga 35, rear view

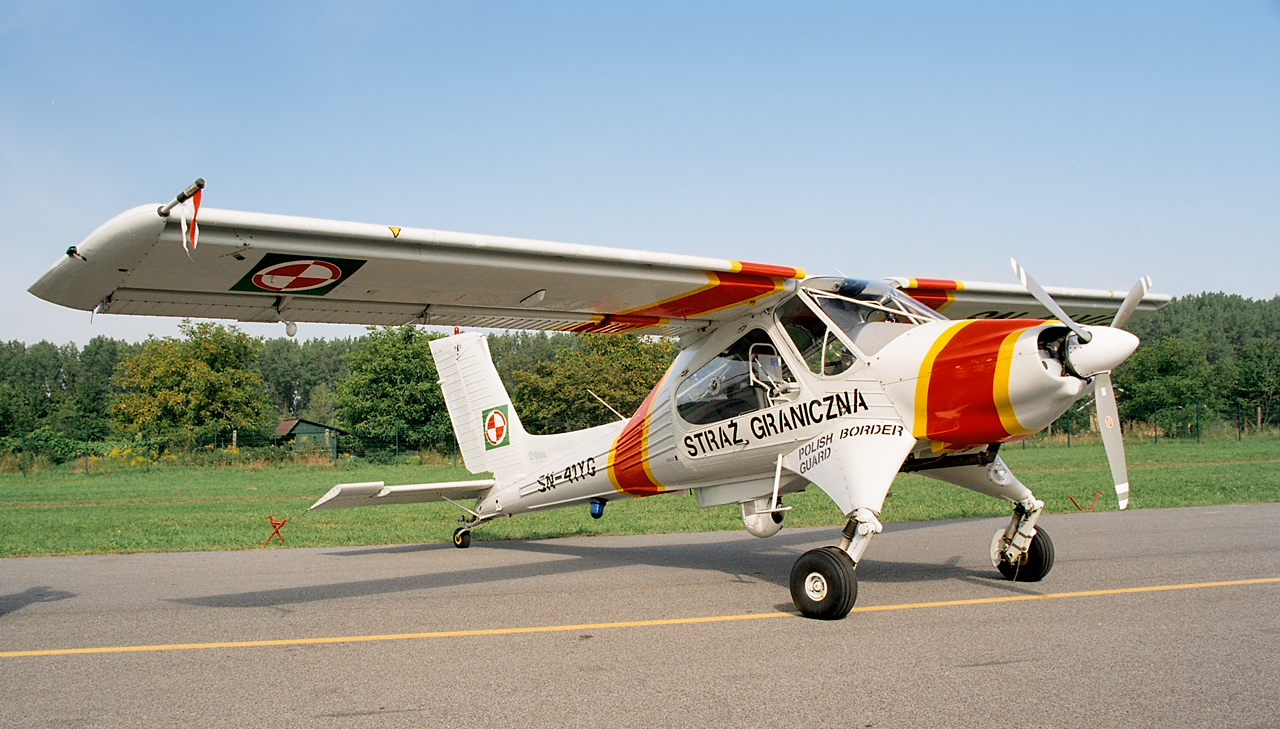
PZL-104M Wilga 2000 of Polish Border Guard at Radom Air Show 2005

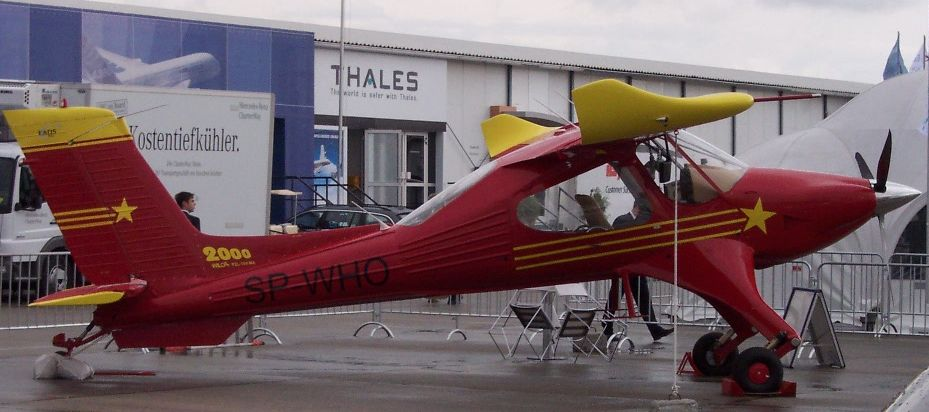
PZL-104MA Wilga 2000

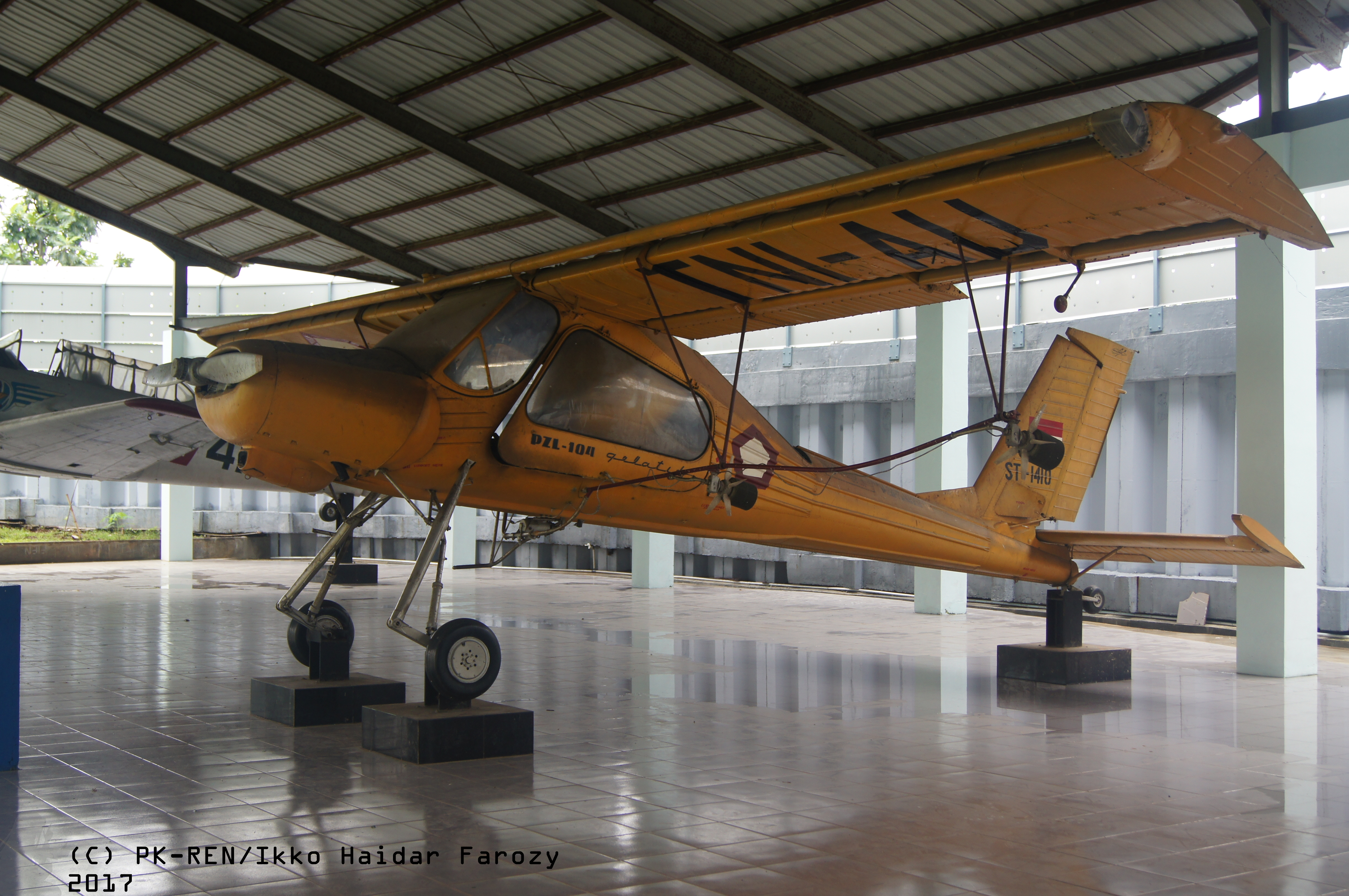
LIPNUR Gelatik 32 on display at Satriamandala Museum, Jakarta

Wilga 2
First production variant with WN-6 flat engine (small series - about 10, converted to Wilga C and 3).
Wilga 3A
Aero club aircraft.
Wilga 3S
Air ambulance aircraft.
Wilga C (2C)
Wilga 2 with Continental O-470 engine for Indonesia. 16 aircraft built in Poland, with some assembled in Indonesia.
Wilga 3
Modified serial variant with AI-14 radial engine, 13 built (including 2 converted Wilga 2s).
Wilga 32
Wilga 3 with Continental O-470 engine for Indonesia. 6 aircraft built in Poland, 18 in Indonesia under the name Gelatik. Some were fitted as agricultural aircraft.
Wilga 35
Basic variant with AI-14 engine.
Wilga 35A
Mass-produced basic variant for sports aviation, with glider towing hook, produced from 1968.
Wilga 35H
Floatplane export variant built in cooperation with Canada, flown 30 October 1979.
Wilga 35P
Military liaison or passenger variant (without towing hook), flown in 1968.
Wilga 35R
Agricultural aircraft of 1978, with 300 L of chemicals (probably not built in series).
Wilga 35S
Air ambulance of 1968, 1 made.
Wilga 40
Variant with one-piece elevators flown in 1969, 2 prototypes only.
Wilga 80
Wilga 35 modified in accordance with FAR regulations for US market, of 1979, powered by PZL AI-14RA engine, serial production.
Wilga 80/1400 (80H)
Export floatplane variant of 1982 built in cooperation with Canada, powered by PZL AI-14RD (206 kW /280 HP) engine.
Wilga 80/550 Melex
Wilga 80 fitted with Continental flat engine in the USA, of 1992 (prototype)
Wilga 88
Development of Wilga in the 1980s, that led to PZL-105 Flaming.
PZL-104M Wilga 2000
Variant with Lycoming flat engine, modified wings and improved aerodynamics, produced from 1998.
PZL-104MW Wilga 2000 Hydro
Floatplane variant of Wilga 2000, flown on 19 September 1999.
PZL-104MF Wilga 2000
Patrol version of Wilga 2000 for Polish Border Guard.
PZL-104MN Wilga 2000
Newer version from 2001.
PZL-104MA Wilga 2000
Last variant of Wilga 2000 made in 2005, with improved aerodynamics and winglets, powered by Lycoming I0-540 300 hp engine. No longer in production.
PZL-104 DRACO Turbine Wilga
Highly modified Wilga 2000, created and built by Mike Patey. Patey attached a Pratt & Whitney PT6A-28 turboprop engine, modified the wings, ailerons, flaps, rudder, elevator, landing gear, and named the aircraft DRACO. The aircraft was destroyed in a takeoff accident in Reno, Nevada on 16 September 2019, when Patey attempted to take off in a gusty cross wind; all passengers survived. In September 2024, Draco Aircraft acquired the rights to the PZL Wilga from Airbus Poland, allowing the company to produce Draco aircraft for private and public customers.
LIPNUR Gelatik
License-built version produced in Indonesia by LIPNUR, production discontinued in 1975.

== Operators ==
=== Military operators ===
Egypt

- Egyptian Air Force - Former operator.

Estonia

- Estonian Air Force - Former operator.

Indonesia

- Indonesian Air Force
- Indonesian Army

Latvia

- Latvian Air Force - Former operator.
- Latvian National Guard - Former operator.

Lithuania

- Lithuanian Air Force - Former operator.
- Lithuanian National Defence Volunteer Forces - Ex-DOSAAF aircraft.

Moldova

- Moldova Air Force - Former operator.

Mongolia

- Mongolian Air Force - Former operator.

Paraguay

- Paraguayan Air Force operated 2 aircraft between 1996 and 2003.

Poland

- Polish Air Force operated 27 aircraft between 1971 and 1993.
- Polish Border Guard operates some (5 in 2005) PZL-104MF Wilgas 2000 as patrol aircraft.
- Polish Navy - Former operator.

Republic of Srpska

- Republika Srpska Air Force - Former operator.

Soviet Union

- DOSAAF

=== Civilian operators ===
Canada

- Royal Canadian Air Cadets - 1 (former operator)

Estonia

- Ridali Airfield - 1, but used to operate at least 3.
- Rapla(Kuusiku) Airfield - 2, one of them rarely used.

Hungary

- Hungarian Police - Former operator.

Indonesia

- Indonesia Flying Club (As of 2015).

Romania

- Romanian Airclub - 8, as of 2020. Private owners - at least two.

Turkey

- Turkish Aeronautical Association - mainly used for aerotowing of gliders

United Kingdom

- Sky Banners

United States

- Wilga'Beast' (M14P Powered - airshows|events).

== Accidents and incidents ==
- On 12 Jan 1996, a PZL-104 (VH-PZS) crashed on North Stradbroke Island near Brisbane. The pilot and his three passengers were killed.
- On 6 May 2010, a PZL-104 carrying UK Independence Party (UKIP) leader Nigel Farage crashed at Hinton-in-the-Hedges Airfield, Northamptonshire.
- On 16 September 2019, a PZL-104 2000 (N123T, popularly known as Draco) was attempting to takeoff from Reno Stead Airport in a crosswind with 38 knot gusts with a subsequent ground loop and crashed beside the runway. The three occupants got out uninjured.

== Specifications (Wilga 35A) ==
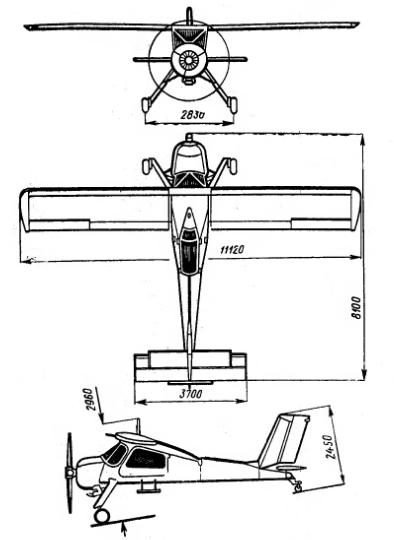

Data from The Illustrated Encyclopedia of Aircraft

General characteristics

- Crew: 1
- Capacity: 3
- Length: 8.10 m (26 ft 6 in)
- Wingspan: 11.12 m (36 ft 5 in)
- Height: 2.96 m (9 ft 6 in)
- Wing area: 15.50 m^{2} (166.85 sq ft)
- Empty weight: 900 kg (1,984 lb)
- Gross weight: 1,300 kg (2,868 lb)
- Powerplant: 1 × Ivchenko AI-14RA air-cooled 9-cylinder radial piston engine , 194 kW (260 hp)

Performance

- Maximum speed: 195 km/h (121 mph, 105 kn)
- Range: 670 km (416 mi, 361 nmi)
- Service ceiling: 4,040 m (13,250 ft)
- Rate of climb: 5.5 m/s (1,082 ft/min)

== See also ==
Related development

- PZL-105 Flaming

Aircraft of comparable role, configuration, and era

- Aero L-60 Brigadýr
- MFI-10 Vipan
