= Ivchenko AI-14 =

Soviet aircraft engine

AI-14/M462
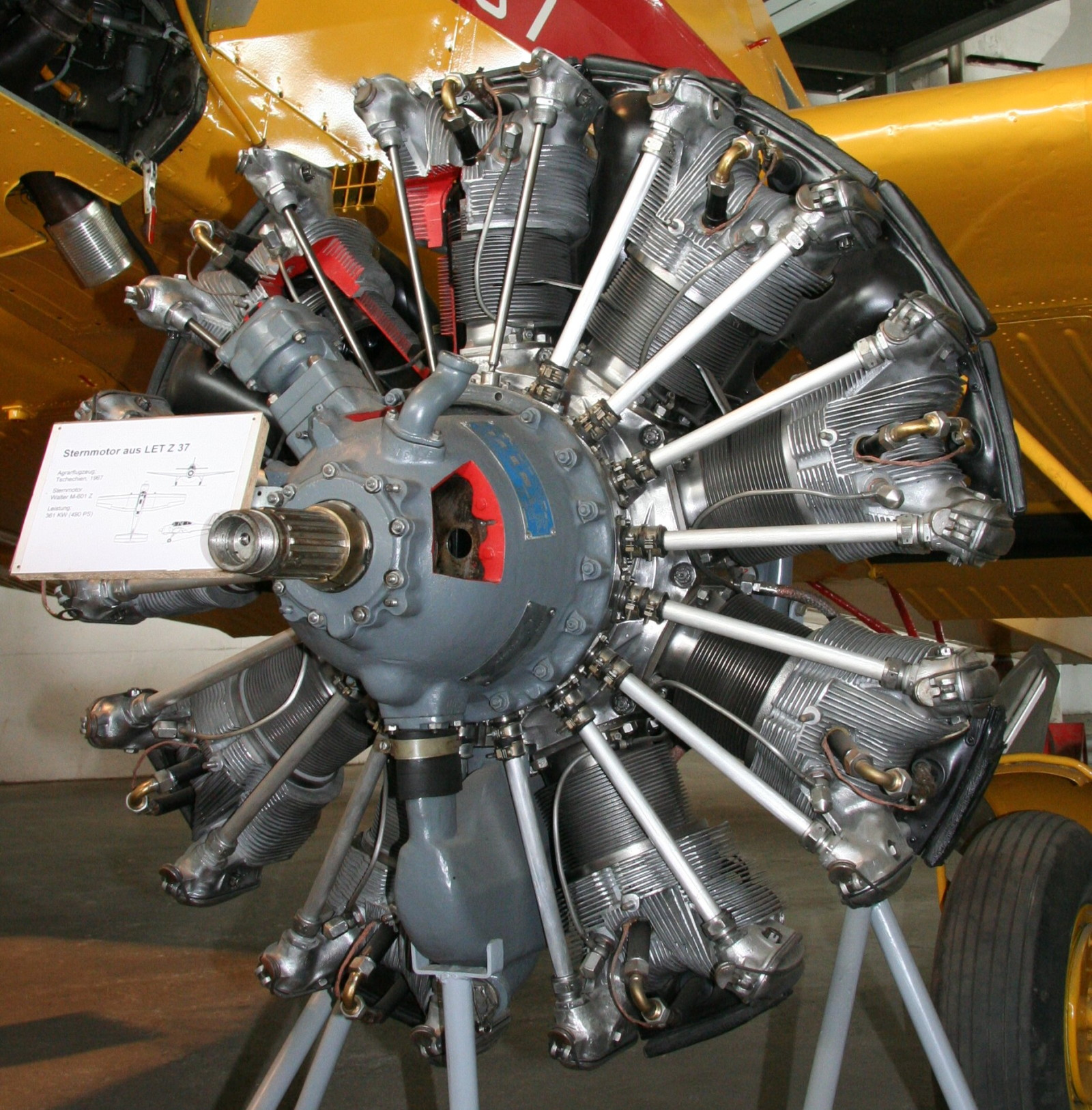
- Avia M462 on display at the Museum für Luftfahrt und Technik, Wernigerode
- Type: Radial engine
- National origin: Soviet Union
- Manufacturer: Ivchenko design bureau
- First run: 1950
- Major applications: Antonov An-14; Nanchang CJ-6; PZL-104 Wilga; Yakovlev Yak-12; Yakovlev Yak-18

The Ivchenko AI-14 (Russian: Ивченко АИ-14) is a nine-cylinder, air-cooled, radial piston engine designed in the Soviet Union to power aircraft.

A variant known as the M462 was produced under license by Avia.

== Variants ==
AI-14
AI-14R
Underwent state trials in December 1950 and was used in many types of light aircraft, typically used with a two-bladed propeller and is started with compressed air. Several thousand were built.
AI-14RA
AI-14V
Variant for helicopters and other applications.
AI-14VF
Variant for helicopters and other applications.
AI-14RF
A variant uprated by Ivan Vedeneyev to 300 hp. Its further development is the Vedeneyev M14P family of engines.
Avia M462
Powers the Zlín Z 37 agricultural aircraft.
Zhuzhou HS-6
The designation for AI-14 Licence production in China.
PZL AI-14R
A licensed version of the AI-14R, produced by WSK-Kalisz in Poland from 1956 until 2007.

== Applications ==
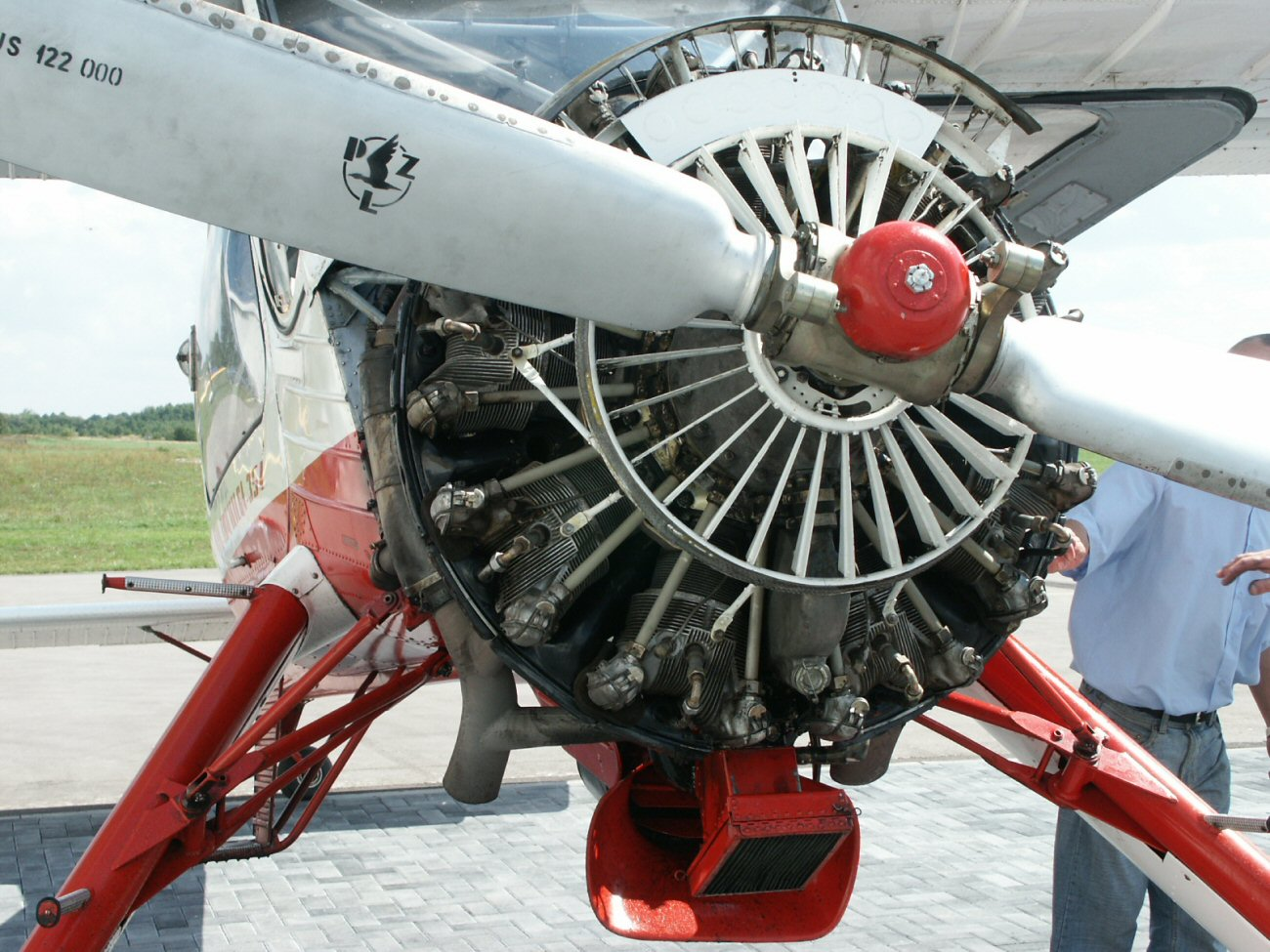
AI-14R engine of a PZL-104 Wilga

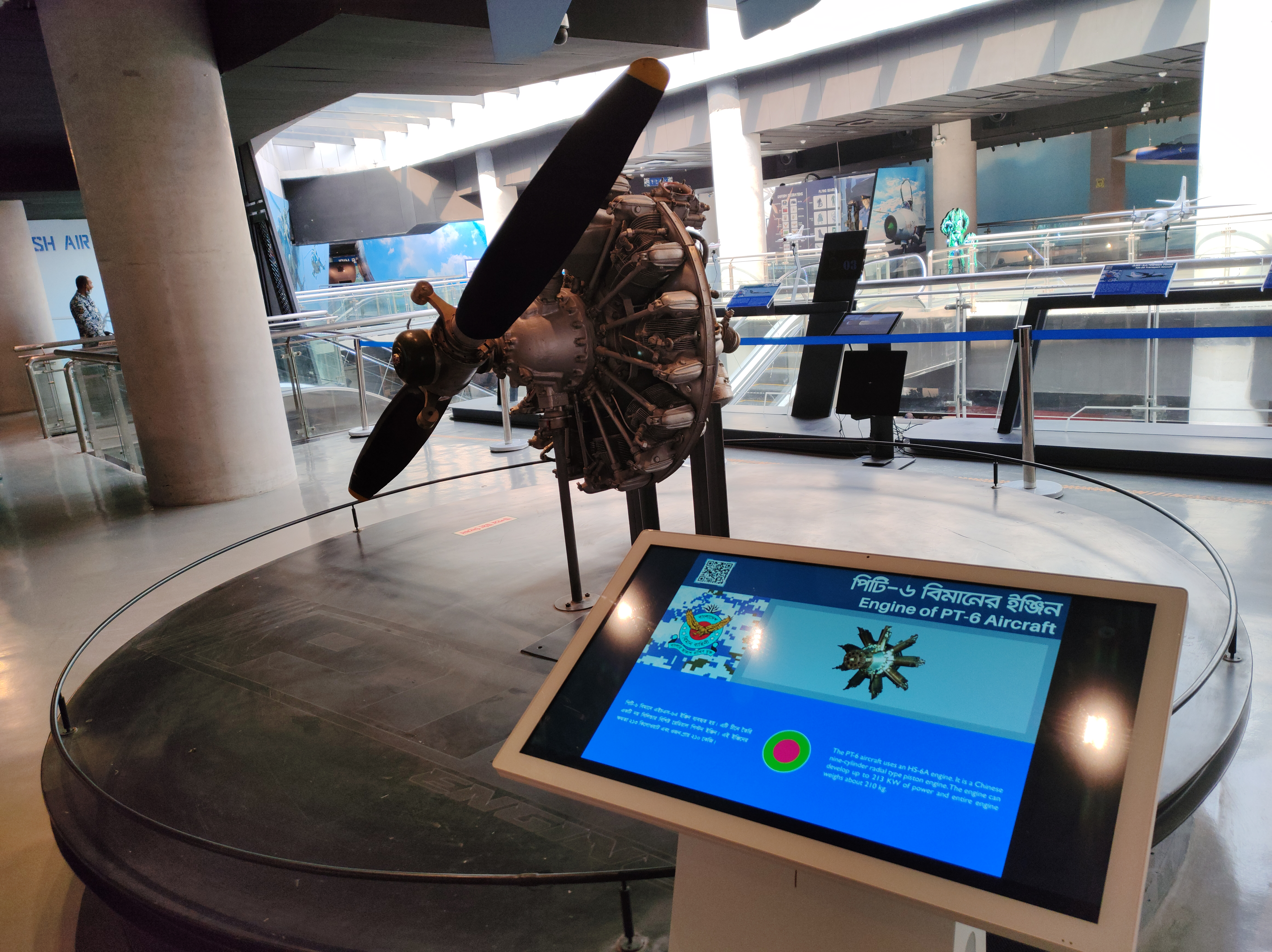
Chinese license-built Zhouzhou HS-6A from BAF PT-6A on display at Bangladesh Military Museum

- Aero L-60 Brigadýr (L-60S variant)
- Antonov An-14 - AI-14RF
- ICA IS-23 - AI-14RF
- Kamov Ka-15 - AI-14V
- Kamov Ka-18 - AI-14VF
- Nanchang CJ-6
- PZL-101 Gawron
- PZL-104 Wilga
- Yakovlev Yak-12
- Yakovlev Yak-18 (Yak-18A variant)
- Zlín Z 37

== Specifications (Ivchenko AI-14RA) ==
Data from Jane's All the World's Aircraft 1982-83.

=== General characteristics ===
- Type: 9-cylinder, air-cooled, radial, engine
- Bore: 105 mm (4.125 in)
- Stroke: 130 mm (5.125 in)
- Displacement: 10.16 L (620 cu in)
- Length: 956 mm (37.63 in)
- Diameter: 985 mm (38.78 in)
- Dry weight: 197 kg (434 lb)

=== Components ===
- Supercharger: Single stage, single speed, geared centrifugal supercharger
- Fuel system: K-14A carburetor
- Oil system: Gear pressure and scavenge pumps
- Cooling system: Air-cooled
- Reduction gear: 0.787:1, left-hand tractor

=== Performance ===
- Power output:
- Power (take-off): 194 kW (260 hp)
- Power (rated): 164 kW (220 hp)
- Compression ratio: 5.9:1

== See also ==
- List of aircraft engines
