= Yakovlev Yak-12 =

Utility aircraft family in the Soviet Air Force

Yak-12
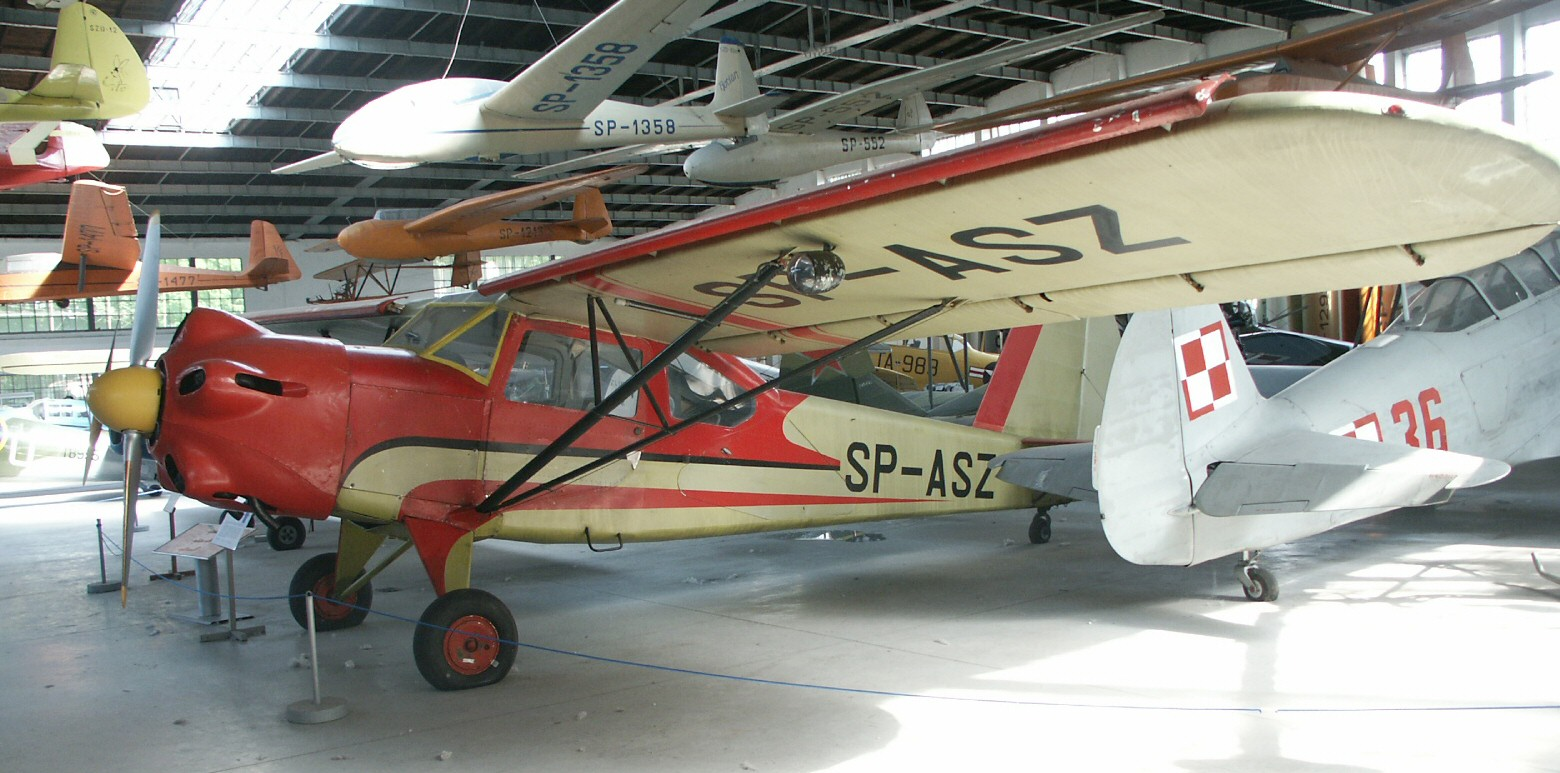
- Yak-12 (basic model) at the Polish Aviation Museum

General information
- Type: Utility aircraft
- Manufacturer: Yakovlev
- Status: In use in civilian aviation
- Primary user: Soviet Air Force
- Number built: 4,992 (without China)

History
- Manufactured: since 1947 to 2010 (1968+ in China only)
- Introduction date: 1947
- First flight: 1946
- Developed from: Yakovlev Yak-10
- Variant: PZL-101 Gawron

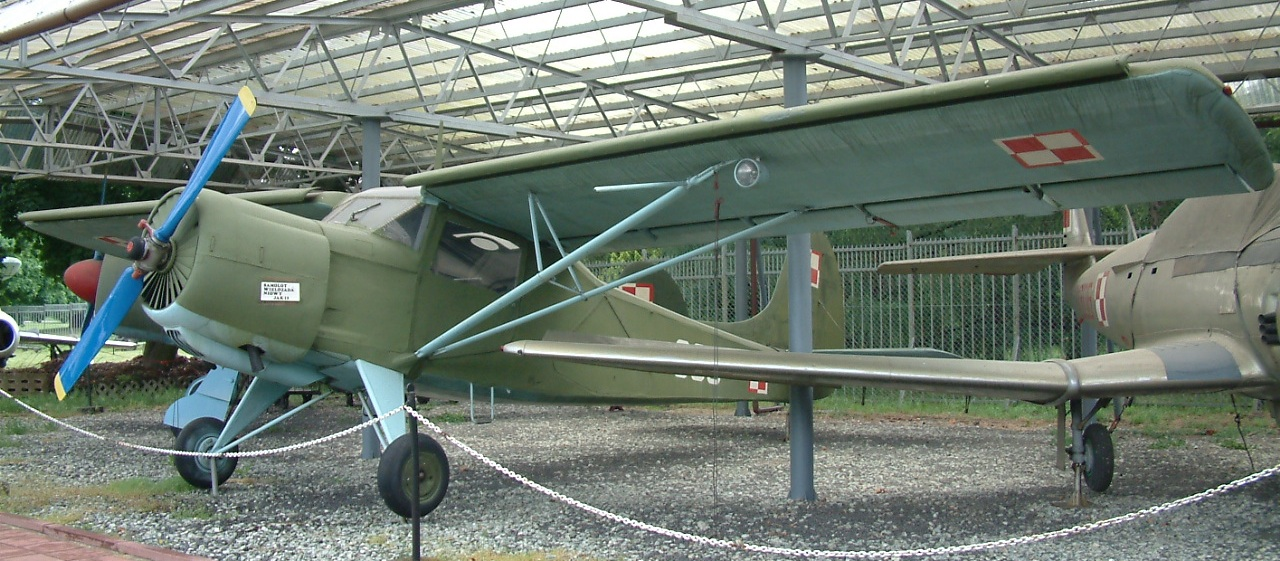
Polish Air Force Yak-12M

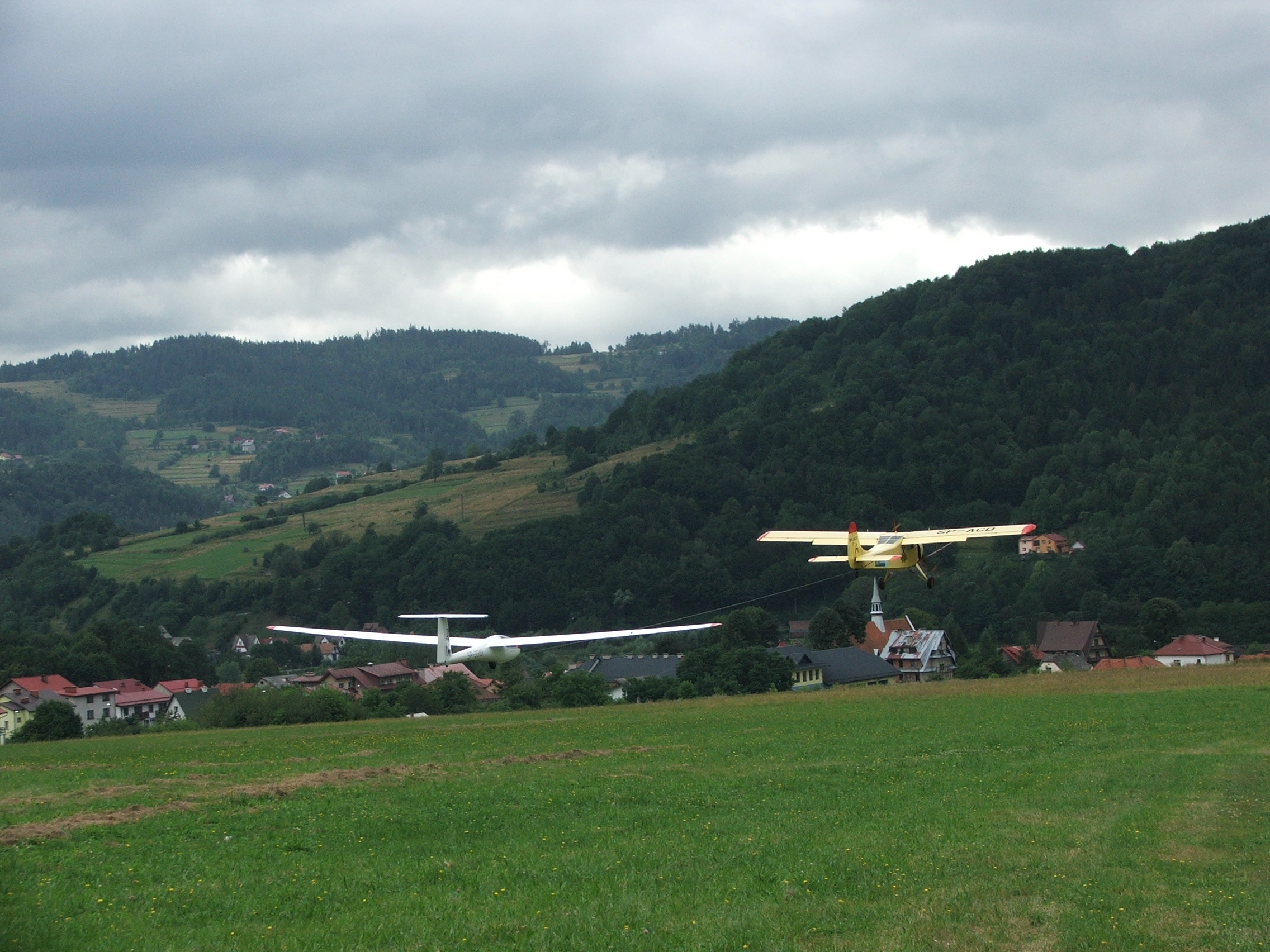
Polish civilian Yak-12M taking off towing a glider

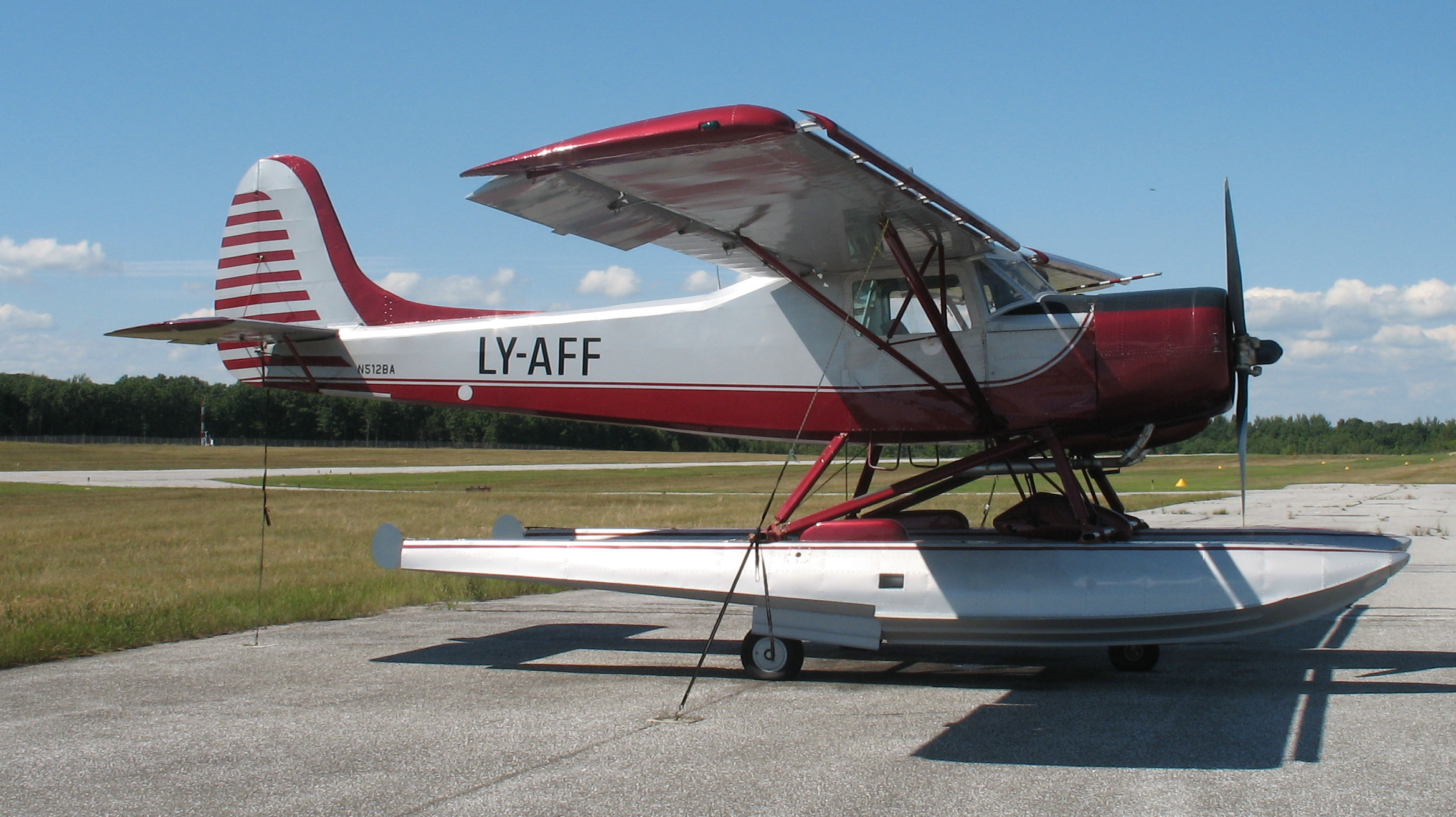
Tied down at the Franklin County State Airport, Highgate, Vermont

The Yakovlev Yak-12 (Russian: Яковлев Як-12, also transcribed as Jak-12, NATO reporting name: "Creek") is a light multirole STOL aircraft used by the Soviet Air Forces, Soviet civilian aviation and other countries from 1947 onwards.

== Design and development ==
The Yak-12 was designed by Alexander Yakovlev's team to meet a requirement of the Soviet Air Force of 1944 for a new liaison and utility plane, to replace the obsolete Po-2 biplane. It was also meant to be used in civil aviation as a successor to Yakovlev's AIR-6 of 1934, built in a relatively small series. Yakovlev's first proposal was a four-place high-wing aircraft, the Yak-10 (first named Yak-14), built in January 1945. It won the competition with a low-wing Yak-13, based on the same fuselage, and a series of 40 Yak-10s were produced, powered with a 108 kW (145 hp) Shvetsov M-11M radial engine.

In 1947, Yakovlev developed a new aircraft to replace the Yak-10. This was fitted with a more powerful 119 kW (160 hp) M-11FR, a new wing and undercarriage, and a fuselage with a revised shape (lower tail). The new type was designated Yak-12, first flying in 1947. 788 of the basic variant were produced, including military observation planes, some Yak-12S air ambulances, Yak-12SKh agricultural aircraft and Yak-12GR floatplanes. A distinguishing feature of the basic Yak-12, just like the Yak-10, were engine cylinders with individual cowlings. It was a plane of a mixed construction and could take 1 or 2 passengers, apart from a pilot.

The next generation Yak-12 entered production in 1952, starting with the Yak-12R. It was fitted with a new 194 kW (260 hp) Ivchenko AI-14R radial engine and all-metal construction. The wing area increased (from 21.6 m^{2} to 23.8 m^{2}). This variant had the least wing loading of all Yak-12s, and therefore the best STOL performance (take-off run 52 m/171 ft, landing 81 m/266 ft).

After being lengthened to improve weight distribution, with further strengthening of the structure and other minor changes, from 1955 the Yak-12M ("modernized") was produced. A visible difference was a lengthened, curved tailfin. This variant became more universal, offering a bigger payload. It took a pilot and 3 passengers and could be fitted with dual controls for training, a stretcher for an ambulance role or an agricultural spraying device. It became the most numerous variant.

The last generation, produced from 1957, was the Yak-12A. It was an aerodynamically refined variant, with a slimmer fuselage and a new wing. The cowling was smaller diameter. The rectangular wings were fitted with trapezoidal ends and automatic slats, and single struts replaced twin struts. Navigation equipment and controls were improved, and performance also increased. In the USSR, 3,801 Yak-12s were built in all models (including 3,013 Yak-12R, M and A). An experimental Yak-12B biplane was also developed, but did not enter production.

The Yak-12M was licence-built from 1956 in Poland as the WSK-4 Okecie, or Jak-12M (Polish spelling of Russian name). From 1959, the Yak-12A was built in Poland (1,054 Jak-12Ms, 137 Jak-12As), most for export to the USSR. In 1958, further development of the Yak-12M was carried out in Poland, becoming the PZL-101 Gawron.

The Yak-12 was also produced in China as Shenyang type 5.

== Operational history ==
Yak-12s first entered service in the Soviet Air Force as a liaison and artillery observation plane. Then, they were used also in the Soviet civilian aviation – mostly in the DOSAAF aero club for transport, pilot training, parachute training, and glider towing. They were also used as air ambulances and agricultural aircraft.

Apart from the Soviet Union, Yak-12s were used in Poland, Czechoslovakia, Yugoslavia (civil and military), and Hungary (civil). Licence-built Shenyangs were used in China and other countries. In some countries, including Poland, Hungary and Czechoslovakia, the Russian name was transcribed as Jak-12.

In the Polish Air Force, about 90 Yak-12s were used from 1951, as liaison, patrol, and general utility planes. Most were withdrawn in the 1970s, the last in the 1980s. Most were next handed over to civil aviation. In Poland, the first civilian model was acquired in 1952, and larger numbers were used from the 1960s (at least 79). They were used mostly in regional aeroclubs for pilot training, parachute training, transport, and glider towing. 21 were used as air ambulances.

Some civil Yak-12s (mostly Yak-12A) remained in use as of 2006.

On July 12, 2012, a Yak-12 chartered by Canada's Kinross Gold Corporation, crashed shortly after takeoff from an airport in Nouakchott, Mauritania.

== Description ==
They were braced high-wing monoplanes of metal construction (Yak-12R, M, A) or mixed construction (Yak-12), conventional in layout, and covered in metal and canvas. The wings were fitted with flaps and slats (automatic slats in Yak-12R and A, or fixed in other variants). There was a four-seat cabin (in early variants of Yak-12 – 2 or 3 seats), and a conventional fixed landing gear with tail wheel.

There was a single radial engine: 5-cylinder M-11FR (nominal power 104 kW/140 hp, take-off power 118 kW/160 hp) – Yak-12 basic variant; 9-cylinder AI-14R (nominal power 161 kW/220 hp, take-off power 191 kW/260 hp) – Yak-12R, M and A.

The planes had a two-blade propeller, and two fuel tanks in the wings (225 L (55 US gal) each).

== Variants ==
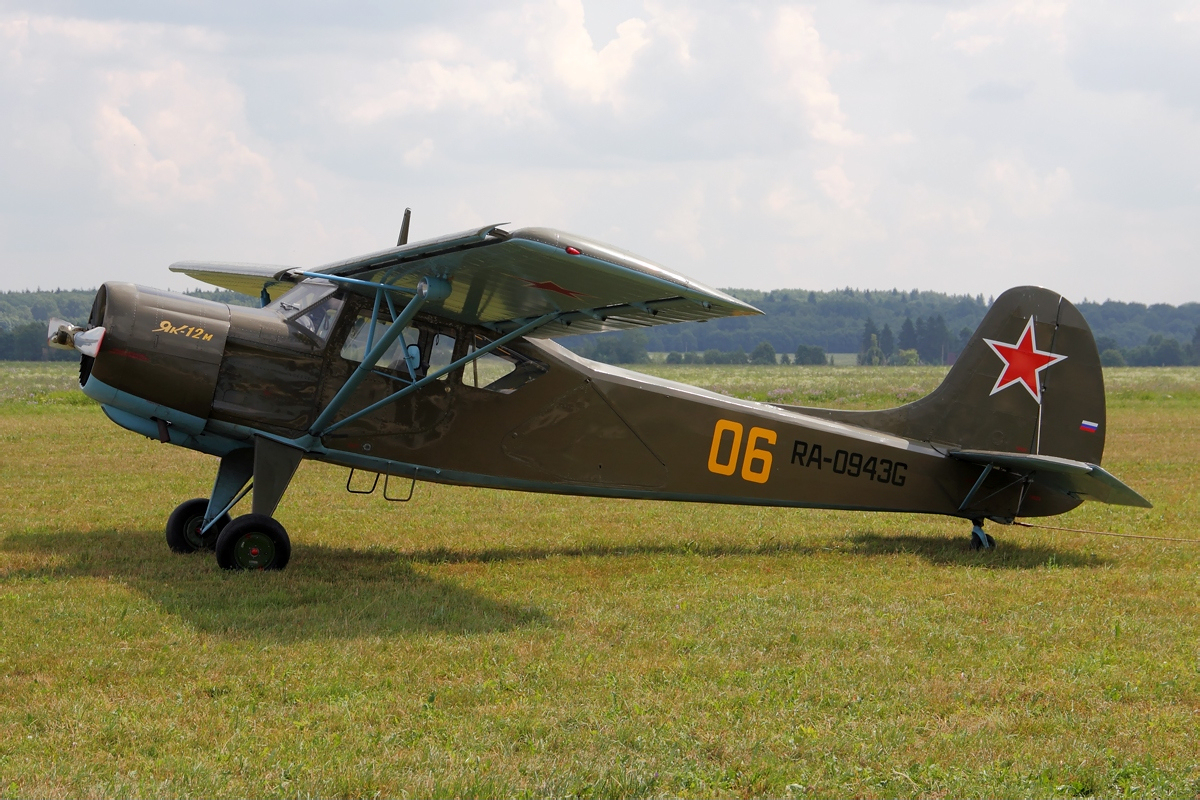
Yak-12M, main production version

Yak-12
Basic variant built for military and civilian operators.
Yak-12GR
Floatplane version of the Yak-12.
Yak-12S
Air ambulance version of the Yak-12.
Yak-12SKh
Agricultural version of the Yak-12.
Yak-12R
Improved version of the Yak-12 powered by Ivchenko AI-14R engine and the plane construction became all-metal, built from 1952.
Yak-12M
Main production version with further construction strengthening, a lengthened tailfin and other minor changes, built from 1955.
Yak-12A
Aerodynamically refined version with a slimmer fuselage, engine cover with smaller diameter and some wing modifications, built from 1957.
Yak-12B
Experimental biplane version, not produced.
Shenyang type 5
Yak-12 licence-built in China.
Jak-12M
Yak-12M licence-built in Poland, 1,054 built.
Jak-12A
Yak-12A licence-built in Poland, 137 built.
PZL-101 Gawron
Polish development of the licence-built Yak-12M.

== Operators ==
=== Military operators ===
Bulgaria

- Bulgarian Air Force

Czechoslovakia

- Czechoslovak Air Force only one Yak 12R tested.

Hungary

- Hungarian Air Force

Mongolia

- Military of Mongolia

Poland

- Polish Air Force operated Yak-12 aircraft (transcribed as Jak-12) since 1951, as liaison, patrol and general utility planes. Most were withdrawn in the 1970s, the last in the 1980s.

Soviet Union

- Soviet Air Force

Yugoslavia

- Yugoslavian Air Force

=== Civil operators ===
People's Republic of China
Czechoslovakia
Hungary
Poland

- Aeroklub Polski since 1952
- Air ambulance service

Mongolia

- MIAT

Soviet Union

- DOSAAF aero club operated Yak-12s for transport, pilot training, parachute training, and glider towing. They were also used as air ambulances and agricultural aircraft.

Yugoslavia

== Specifications (Yak-12M) ==
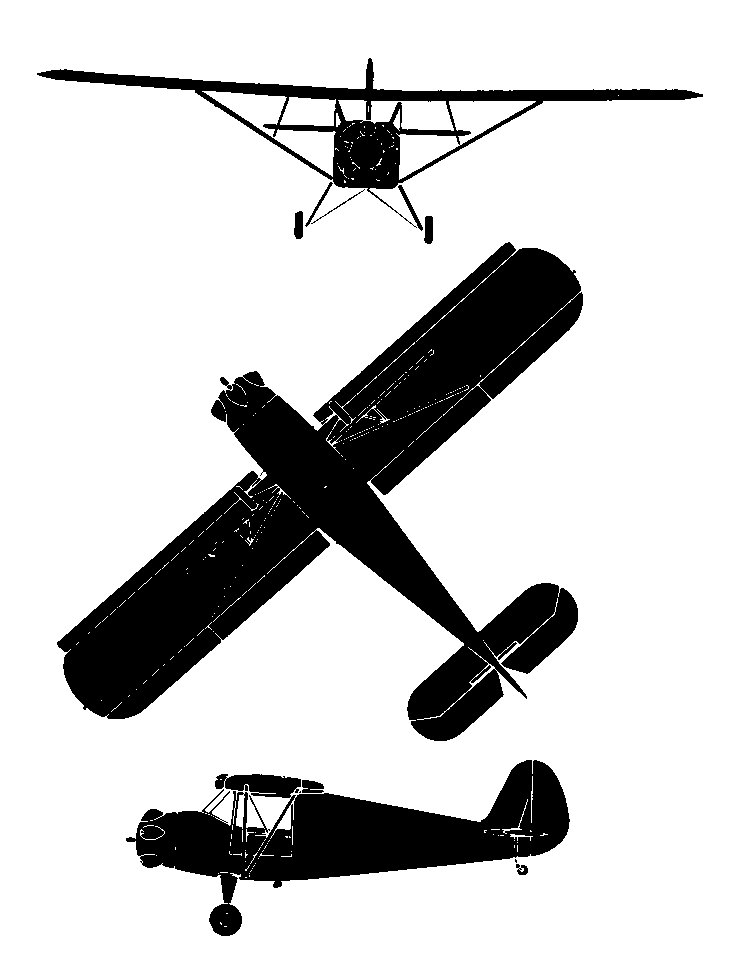
Yak-12 3-view drawing

Data from OKB Yakovlev, Soviet Transport Aircraft since 1945

General characteristics

- Crew: one
- Capacity: three passengers
- Length: 9 m (29 ft 6 in)
- Height: 3.12 m (10 ft 3 in)
- Wing area: 23.8 m^{2} (256 sq ft)
- Airfoil: Clark YH
- Empty weight: 1,026 kg (2,262 lb)
- Gross weight: 1,450 kg (3,197 lb)
- Powerplant: 1 × Ivchenko AI-14R 9-cylinder, air-cooled, radial piston engine, 191 kW (256 hp)
- Propellers: 2-bladed fixed-pitch propeller

Performance

- Maximum speed: 182 km/h (113 mph, 98 kn) at sea level
- Cruise speed: 127 km/h (79 mph, 69 kn) economical
- Landing speed: 82 km/h (51 mph; 44 kn)
- Range: 765 km (475 mi, 413 nmi)
- Service ceiling: 4,160 m (13,650 ft)
- Rate of climb: 4.1 m/s (810 ft/min)
- Time to altitude: 1,000 m (3,300 ft) in 4 minutes
- Take-off run: 126 m (413 ft)
- Landing run: 90 m (300 ft)

== See also ==
Related development

- Yakovlev Yak-10
- Yakovlev Yak-13
- PZL-101 Gawron

Aircraft of comparable role, configuration, and era

- Fieseler Fi 156
- Aero L-60 Brigadýr
- Piper PA-20 Pacer
- Cessna 170
