= PZL-101 Gawron =

Agricultural and utility aircraft

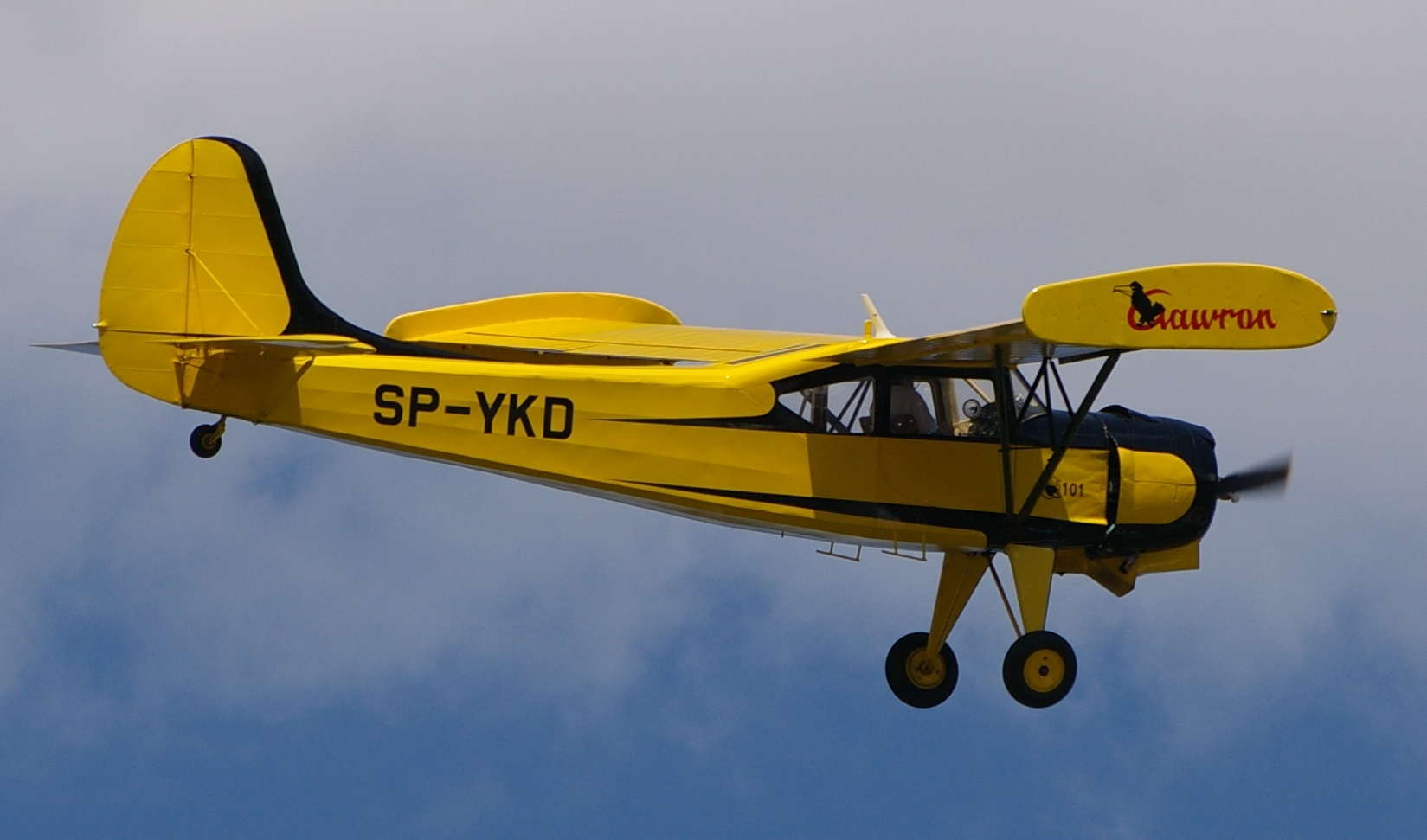
- PZL-101A utility variant in a typical livery

General information
- Type: Agricultural and utility aircraft
- Manufacturer: WSK-Okęcie
- Primary users: Poland Bulgaria; Hungary; Austria
- Number built: 325

History
- Manufactured: 1960-1968
- First flight: 14 April 1958
- Developed from: Yakovlev Yak-12

The PZL-101 Gawron (rook) is a Polish agricultural and utility aircraft designed and built by WSK-Okęcie (later PZL "Warszawa-Okęcie").

== Design and development ==
The PZL-101 was a development of the Yakovlev Yak-12M, manufactured in Poland under licence from 1956. The main goal was to create an agricultural aircraft with increased useful load. Works were carried out by a team led by Stanisław Lassota. Behind two crew seats there was installed a container for 500 kg of chemicals, with a "hump" above a fuselage. Because a center of gravity moved rearwards, the plane was fitted with new, swept wings, with significant vertical end plates to improve air flow. Later, in most of the aircraft they were removed, because they increased side surface, making landing very tricky in crosswind. Main landing gear was also shifted rearwards, comparing with Yak-12. Equipment was also simplified and lightened to increase useful load, e.g. the right door was removed.

The first prototype flew on April 14, 1958, and the production of the PZL-101 started in 1960. From 1962 the PZL-101A variant was produced, with improved equipment, pilot's seat raised and a right-side door added. From 1965 a further improved PZL-101B was produced. Visible changes were: lack of "hump" above the fuselage and a bigger air intake below engine. Apart from agricultural planes, there were made four-seater utility planes and air ambulances. Until production end in 1968, 325 planes were manufactured, including 215 agricultural ones, 78 utility ones and 32 air ambulances.

== Operational history ==
The main user of the PZL-101 was the Polish civilian aviation. Polish agricultural planes were used in Poland and in services abroad (Austria, Libya, Egypt). They were mostly replaced in this role in the late 1970s by the PZL-106 Kruk and PZL-Mielec M-18 Dromader. Air ambulances were used in the Polish civilian aviation. Utility Gawrons were used in aero clubs in the country, also for glider towing and parachute training (with removed right doors). In 2006 there remained 40 Gawrons in the Polish registry, including 4 private owned.

134 PZL-101s were exported, mainly to Hungary and Bulgaria, in lesser numbers to eight other countries.

On 30 March 2007 EADS PZL "Warszawa-Okęcie" S.A. announced that will not longer support their tasks related with flight certificates for Jak-12A, Jak-12M and PZL-101 Gawron. Between 31 March and 28 June 2007 Polish Civil Aviation Office was temporary certificate holder. Since 28 June PZL-101s can be used only as experimental aircraft class.

== Description ==
Metal construction braced high-wing monoplane, conventional in layout. Fuselage of a steel frame, covered with duralumin (front) and canvas (tail). Two-spar wings, canvas covered, fitted with slotted flaps, slats and vertical edge plates. Two-seat or four-seat cabin. Conventional fixed landing gear with a tail wheel. In an agricultural variant there was 800-litre container in a fuselage (for 500 kg of chemicals), behind front seats, with exchangeable sets of equipment for spraying or cropdusting.

Single radial engine 9-cylinder AI-14R (cruise power 161 kW/220 hp, take-off power 191 kW/260 hp). Two-blade propeller. Two fuel tanks in wings, 90 L each.

== Variants ==
PZL-101
First production series built between 1960 and 1962.
PZL-101A
Version with improved equipment and a right-side door added, built between 1962 and 1965.
PZL-101B
Improved version lacking of "hump" above the fuselage and with bigger air intake below engine, built between 1965 and 1968.

== Operators ==
- Austria received five aircraft.
- Bulgaria bought 40 aircraft.
- Finland received three aircraft.
- Hungary bought 67 aircraft, 52 were delivered in agro variant.
- India bought six aircraft.
- Poland was the main operator, 191 aircraft were delivered.
- Spanish State bought four aircraft.
- Soviet Union bought two aircraft.
- Turkey bought five aircraft.
- Venezuela bought one aircraft.
- Vietnam bought one aircraft.

== Specifications ==
Data from Jane's All The World's Aircraft 1965-66

General characteristics

- Crew: 1
- Capacity:
  - 3 passengers or
  - 2 stretchers and 1 attendant
  - 500 kg (1,100 lb) powdered chemicals or
  - 605 L (160 US gal; 133 imp gal) liquid chemicals
- Length: 9.00 m (29 ft 6 in)
- Wingspan: 12.60 m (41 ft 4 in)
- Height: 3.12 m (10 ft 3 in)
- Wing area: 23.86 m^{2} (256.8 sq ft)
- Empty weight: 1,004 kg (2,213 lb) (agricultural use)
- Max takeoff weight: 1,660 kg (3,660 lb)
- Fuel capacity: 180 L (48 US gal; 40 imp gal) internal fuel, further 160 L (42 US gal; 35 imp gal) in underwing auxiliary tanks
- Powerplant: 1 × Ivchenko AI-14R air-cooled 9-cylinder radial engine, 190 kW (260 hp)
- Propellers: 2-bladed W530-D-11 constant-speed propeller, 2.75 m (9 ft 0 in) diameter

Performance

- Maximum speed: 160 km/h (99 mph, 86 kn)
- Cruise speed: 130 km/h (81 mph, 70 kn) (econ. cruise)
- Dusting and spraying speed: 110–130 km/h (68–81 mph; 59–70 kn)
- Stall speed: 50 km/h (31 mph, 27 kn) (flaps down)
- Range: 525 km (326 mi, 283 nmi) (ambulance use)
- Service ceiling: 3,600 m (11,800 ft)
- Rate of climb: 3.0 m/s (590 ft/min)
- Take-off run (agricultural): 102 m (335 ft)
- Landing run (agricultural): 90 m (295 ft)

== See also ==
Related development

- Yakovlev Yak-12

Aircraft of comparable role, configuration, and era

- Aero L-60 Brigadyr
