= PZL-105 Flaming =

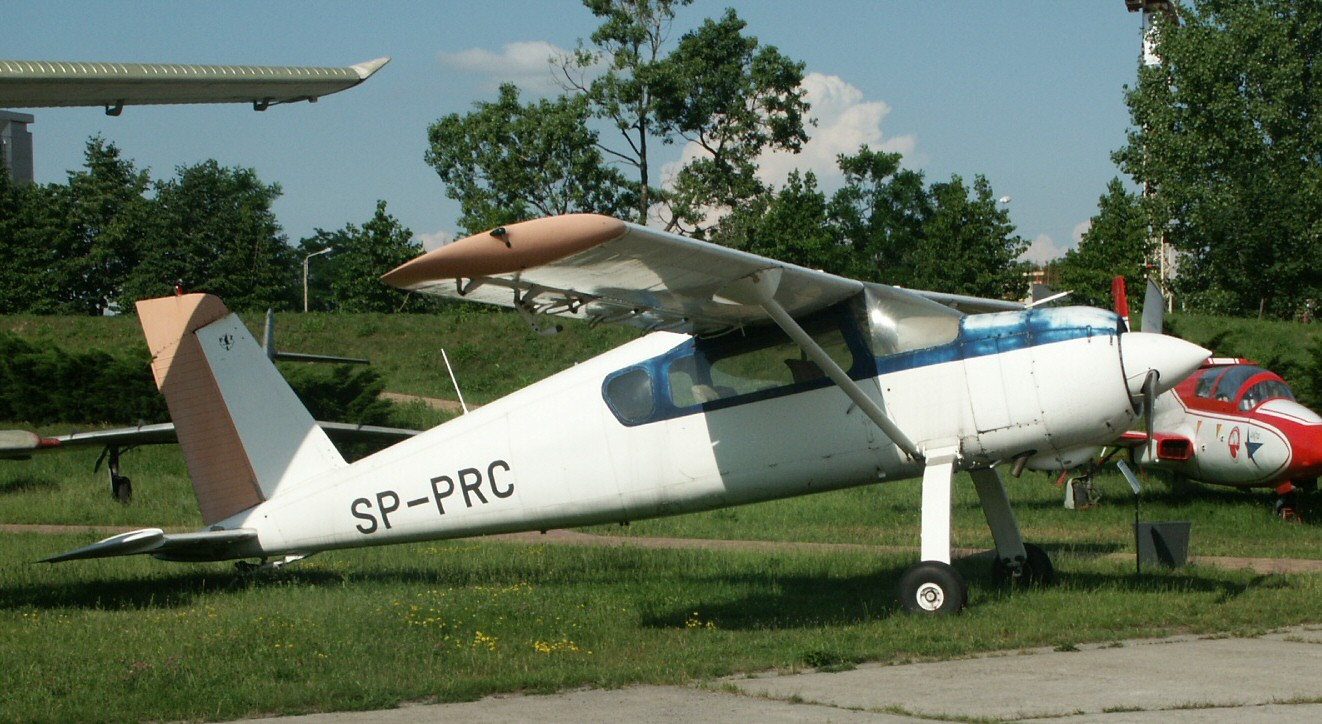
- PZL-105 at the Polish Aviation Museum

General information
- Type: Utility aircraft
- Manufacturer: PZL Warszawa-Okęcie
- Status: Prototype
- Primary user: Polish civilian aviation
- Number built: 2 (prototypes)

History
- First flight: 9 November 1989

The PZL-105 Flaming (flamingo) is a Polish short-takeoff-and-landing (STOL) utility aircraft designed by PZL "Warszawa-Okęcie". It remained a prototype.

== Development ==
The PZL-105 was designed as a successor to the successful utility aircraft PZL-104 Wilga, being more modern and economical and offering increased transport capacity. The design was initially called Wilga 88. It retained the high-wing layout of the PZL-104 and the upward-opening side doors, but it was a completely new aircraft. Compared with the Wilga, it has a six-seat cabin instead of four seats and the wings are supported by single struts instead of a cantilever design. The plane was intended for a variety of purposes, like glider towing, parachute training, transport, air ambulance, patrolling and crop dusting (with 500 kg of chemicals). Also, a seaplane variant was intended.

The first prototype, powered by a 265 kW (360 hp) Russian M-14P radial engine, was first flown on 9 November 1989 (markings SP-PRC). An intended designation of a serial variant was PZL-105M. The second prototype, designated PZL-105L, was fitted with a flat engine 298 kW (400 hp) Lycoming IO-720. It was flown on 27 July 1991 (markings SP-PRD). There was also made one prototype for static trials.

Problems with funding at the outbreak of the 1980s and 1990s, connected with a change of political system in Poland, and the priority of the PZL-130 Orlik trainer program, had caused the Flaming program to be suspended, and production of the type has yet to have started. The company developed a new variant of the PZL-104, the Wilga 2000 with Lycoming IO-540 flat engine instead.

== Design ==
Metal construction braced high-wing monoplane, conventional in layout, duralumin covered. Semi-monocoque fuselage. Rectangular single-spar wings, fitted with Fowler flaps and slotted flaperons. Six-seat cabin with three rows of seats, with large side doors opening upwards. Conventional fixed landing gear with tail wheel, the main gear is made of composite spring legs. Two-blade or three-blade (PZL-105L) metal propeller. Fuel tanks in wings (270 L).

== Surviving aircraft ==
The first prototype and the second prototype airframe (lacking engine) are in a collection of the Polish Aviation Museum in Kraków.

== Specifications (PZL-105M) ==
Data from Jane's All The World's Aircraft 1993-94.

General characteristics

- Crew: 1
- Capacity: 5 pax / 450 kg (990 lb) cargo
- Length: 8.7 m (28 ft 7 in)
- Wingspan: 12.97 m (42 ft 7 in)
- Height: 2.87 m (9 ft 5 in)
- Wing area: 16.9 m^{2} (182 sq ft)
- Aspect ratio: 9.95
- Airfoil: NASA GA(W)-1
- Empty weight: 1,130 kg (2,491 lb)
- Max takeoff weight: 1,850 kg (4,079 lb)
- Fuel capacity: 270 L (71 US gal; 59 imp gal) in two integral wing tanks
- Powerplant: 1 × Vedeneyev M-14P 9-cylinder air-cooled radial piston engine, 268.5 kW (360.1 hp)
- Propellers: 2-bladed W-530TA-D35, 2.4 m (7 ft 10 in) diameter constant-speed propeller

Performance

- Maximum speed: 245 km/h (152 mph, 132 kn)
- Cruise speed: 205 km/h (127 mph, 111 kn) max

188 km/h (117 mph; 102 kn) economical

- Stall speed: 102 km/h (63 mph, 55 kn) flaps down engine idling
- Never exceed speed: 306 km/h (190 mph, 165 kn)
- Range: 1,044 km (649 mi, 564 nmi) at max cruising speed

1,085 km (674 mi; 586 nmi) at economical cruise speed

- Service ceiling: 4,140 m (13,580 ft)
- g limits: +3.8 -1.52
- Rate of climb: 5.5 m/s (1,080 ft/min) at sea level
- Wing loading: 109.5 kg/m^{2} (22.4 lb/sq ft)
- Power/mass: 0.145 kW/kg (0.088 hp/lb)
- Take-off: 176 m (577 ft)
- Landing: 153 m (502 ft)
- Take-off to 50 m (160 ft): 338 m (1,109 ft)
- Landing from 50 m (160 ft): 326 m (1,070 ft)

== See also ==
Related development

- PZL-104 Wilga
