= Antonov An-14 =

1958 utility aircraft family by Antonov

An-14 Pchelka / Bdzhilka
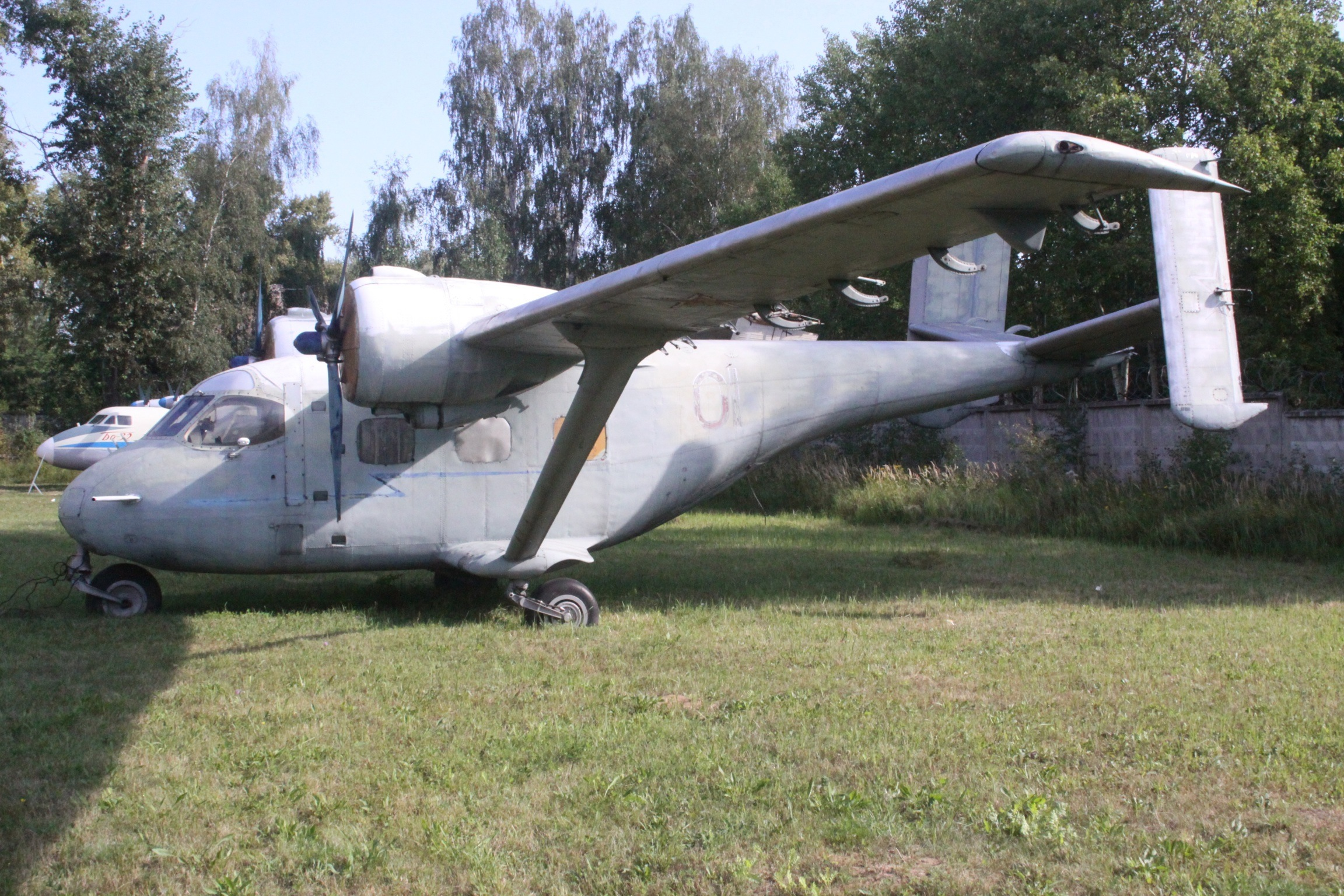
- Preserved An-14 on public display.

General information
- Type: Utility transport
- Manufacturer: Antonov
- Status: In limited service as private aircraft
- Primary users: Soviet Air Force Aeroflot; Afghan Air Force; East German Air Force
- Number built: 332

History
- Manufactured: 1965–1972
- Introduction date: 1966
- First flight: 15 March 1958
- Developed into: Antonov An-28

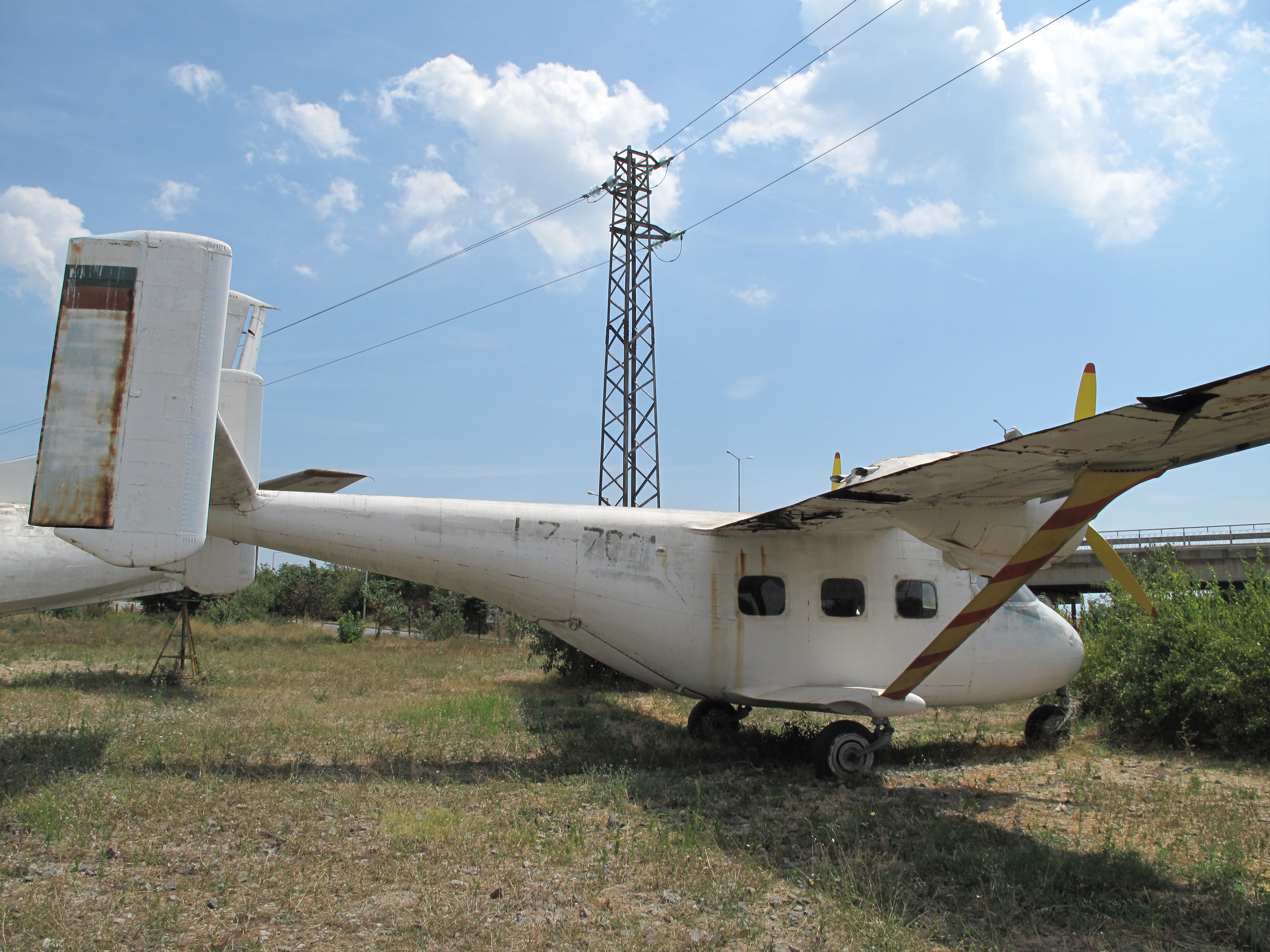
Antonov An-14 registration LZ-7001 (Balkan Bulgarian Airlines)

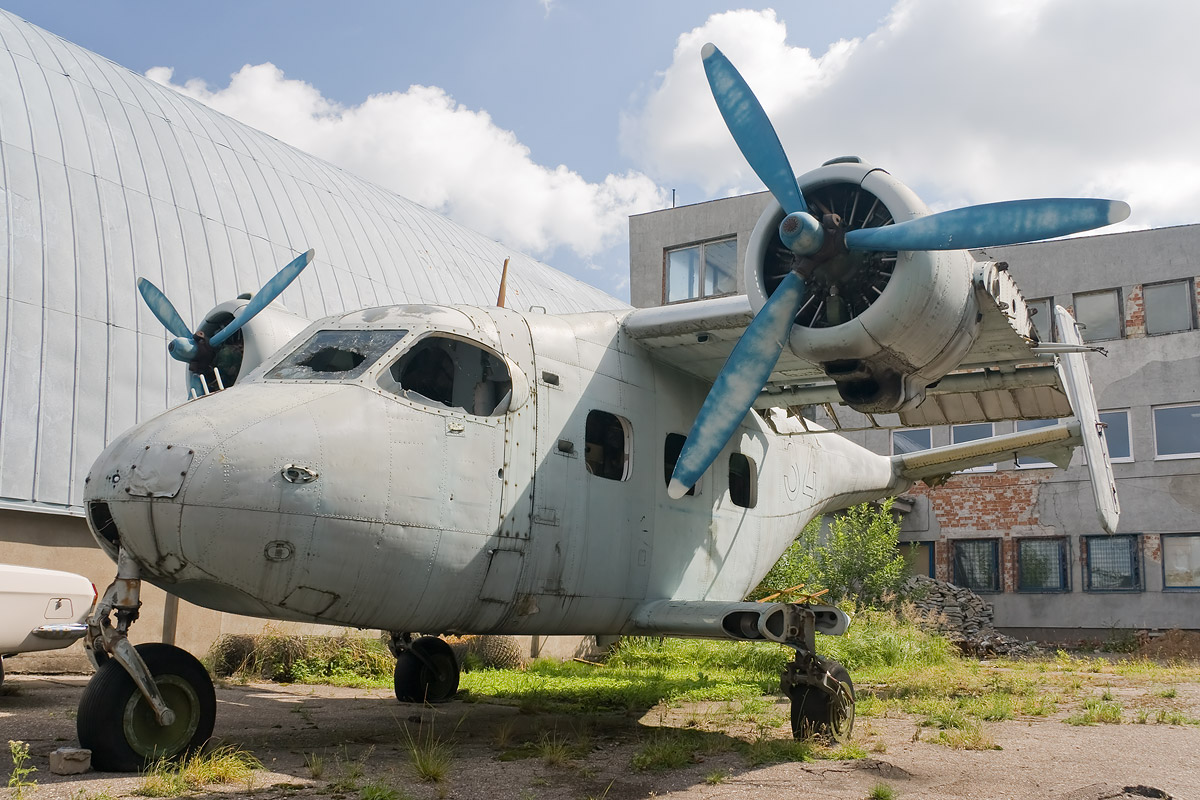
Antonov An-14A

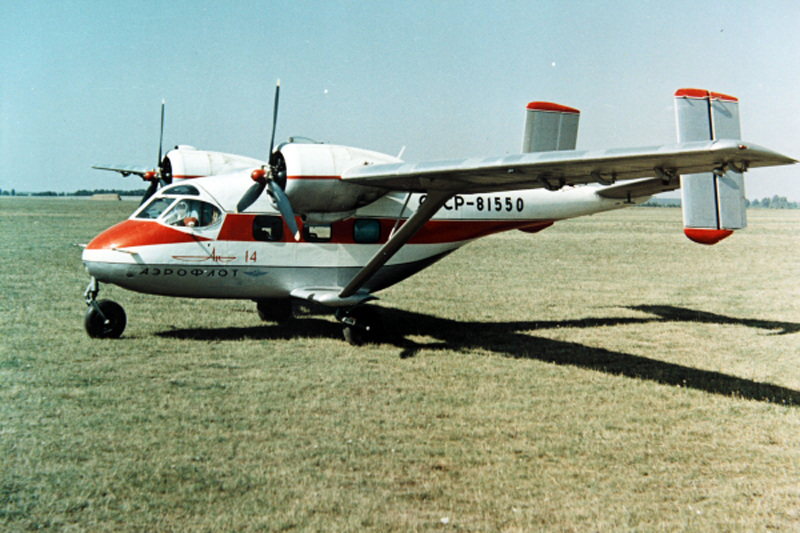
An-14

The Antonov An-14 Pchelka or Bdzhilka (Ukrainian: «Бджілка», "Little Bee", NATO reporting name: Clod) is a Soviet utility aircraft which was first flown on 15 March 1958. It was a twin-engined light STOL utility transport, with two 300 hp Ivchenko AI-14RF radial piston engines. Serial production started in 1966, and about 300 examples were built by the time production ended in 1972. The An-14 failed to replace the more successful An-2 biplane, which was manufactured until 2001.

With very stable flight characteristics, the An-14 could be flown by most pilots after a few hours of basic training. A small number of An-14s are still in airworthy condition.

== History ==
The development goal was a plane that was easy to fly and could be used as a light passenger and cargo transport as well as agricultural aircraft and air ambulance. The maiden flight took place on March 15, 1958. Aeroflot had planned to introduce the type in 1959 but the project was delayed by development problems with the Antonov An-10 which tied down the complete Antonov OKB, as well as issues with the An-14 prototype itself.

The An-14A went into production in 1965 in the state-owned aircraft factory No. 166 in Arsenyev. By now, it had different wings, a distinctly V-shaped tail plane and modified vertical stabilizers. A large cargo door at the rear of the cabin had an opening of 0.85 by 1.90 metres (2.8 by 6.2 ft). In 1967, the type was presented at the milestone Domodedovo air show.

The An-14 had a capacity of seven passengers or 600 kg (1,300 lb) of freight. For aerial application in agriculture, it could be fitted with a 1,000-litre (260 US gal) tank and spraying booms. The air ambulance version was able to accept six stretchers and one nurse. There was also a VIP version for five passengers. Other variants included the An-14B with retractable landing gear, as well as the An-14M with turboprop engines which was later developed into the Antonov An-28. The maiden flight of the An-14M took place in 1969. It received a stretched fuselage and high-lift wing. Like the An-14B, its prototype had been fitted with retractable landing gear, but that was dropped in the final production version.

Another unusual variant was the An-14Sh, which tested an air cushion landing gear for unprepared landing strips. While these tests were successful, the gear impaired the aerodynamics and only left minimal payload capacity. A precursor of the An-14Sh had been the An-714 with inflatable floats. In China, there was a smaller variant named Sha-Tu (or Capital) N°1.

15 An-14 were exported, four of which went to the East German Army in 1966. They were used by the Verbindungsfliegerstaffel 25 (aerial liaison squadron) of the East German Air Force in Strausberg, renamed to VS-14 in 1971, until 1980 or 1981. Two of these, 995 and 996, survive in the German Air Force Museum and the Airport Museum Cottbus.

Production ceased in 1976 after 332 units as the type proved unable to replace the Antonov An-2.

== Design ==
A high-wing plane with struts, all variants except the An-14M are powered by two Ivchenko AI-14 air-cooled nine-cylinder radial engines. The strut-braced wing has automatic leading-edge slats and split flaps. Twin vertical stabilizers are mounted on the tips of the tail plane in the air stream of the propellers. The tricycle landing gear was not retractable in the original variant but could be fitted with skis for winter use. Short sponsons serve to mount the main gear. The fuselage is an all-metal semi-monocoque design.

== Operators ==
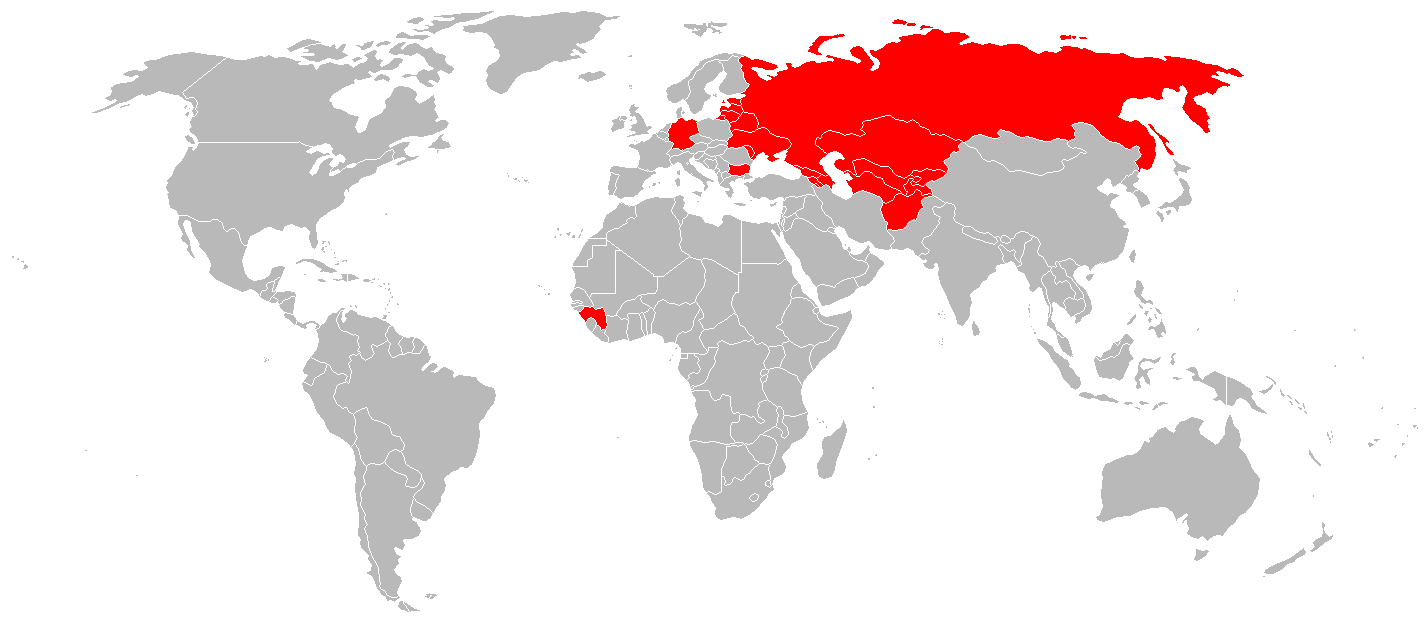
An-14 operators

Afghanistan

- Afghan Air Force - operated 12 from 1985 through 1991.

Bulgaria

- Balkan Bulgarian Airlines

East Germany

- East German Air Force

Mongolia

- Mongolian People's Air Force - operated 2 from the early 1970s through the 1980s

Guinea

- Military of Guinea

Yugoslavia

- Letalski center Maribor - civil operator YU-BCD crashed 1967

Soviet Union

- Soviet Air Force
- Aeroflot

== Specifications (An-14) ==
Data from Soviet Transport Aircraft since 1945

General characteristics

- Crew: two
- Capacity: 6-8 passengers / 720 kg (1,587 lb) payload
- Length: 11.36 m (37 ft 3 in)
- Wingspan: 21.99 m (72 ft 2 in)
- Height: 4.63 m (15 ft 2 in)
- Wing area: 39.72 m^{2} (427.5 sq ft)
- Aspect ratio: 12.15:1
- Empty weight: 2,600 kg (5,732 lb)
- Gross weight: 3,450 kg (7,606 lb)
- Max takeoff weight: 3,600 kg (7,937 lb)
- Cabin size: 3.1 m × 1.53 m × 1.6 m (10.17 ft × 5.02 ft × 5.25 ft)
- Powerplant: 2 × Ivchenko AI-14RF 9-cylinder air-cooled radial piston engines, 220 kW (300 hp) each
- Propellers: 3-bladed variable-pitch propellers

Performance

- Maximum speed: 210 km/h (130 mph, 110 kn)
- Cruise speed: 180 km/h (110 mph, 97 kn)
- Landing speed: 80 km/h (50 mph; 43 kn)
- Range: 650 km (400 mi, 350 nmi)
- Service ceiling: 5,000 m (16,000 ft)
- Take-off run: 100–110 m (328–361 ft)
- Landing run: 110 m (361 ft)

== See also ==
Related development

- Antonov An-28
- Antonov An-38

Aircraft of comparable role, configuration, and era

- IAI Arava
- Short SC.7 Skyvan
