= Aero L-60 Brigadýr =

General aviation aircraft by Aero in Czechoslovakia

L-60 Brigadýr
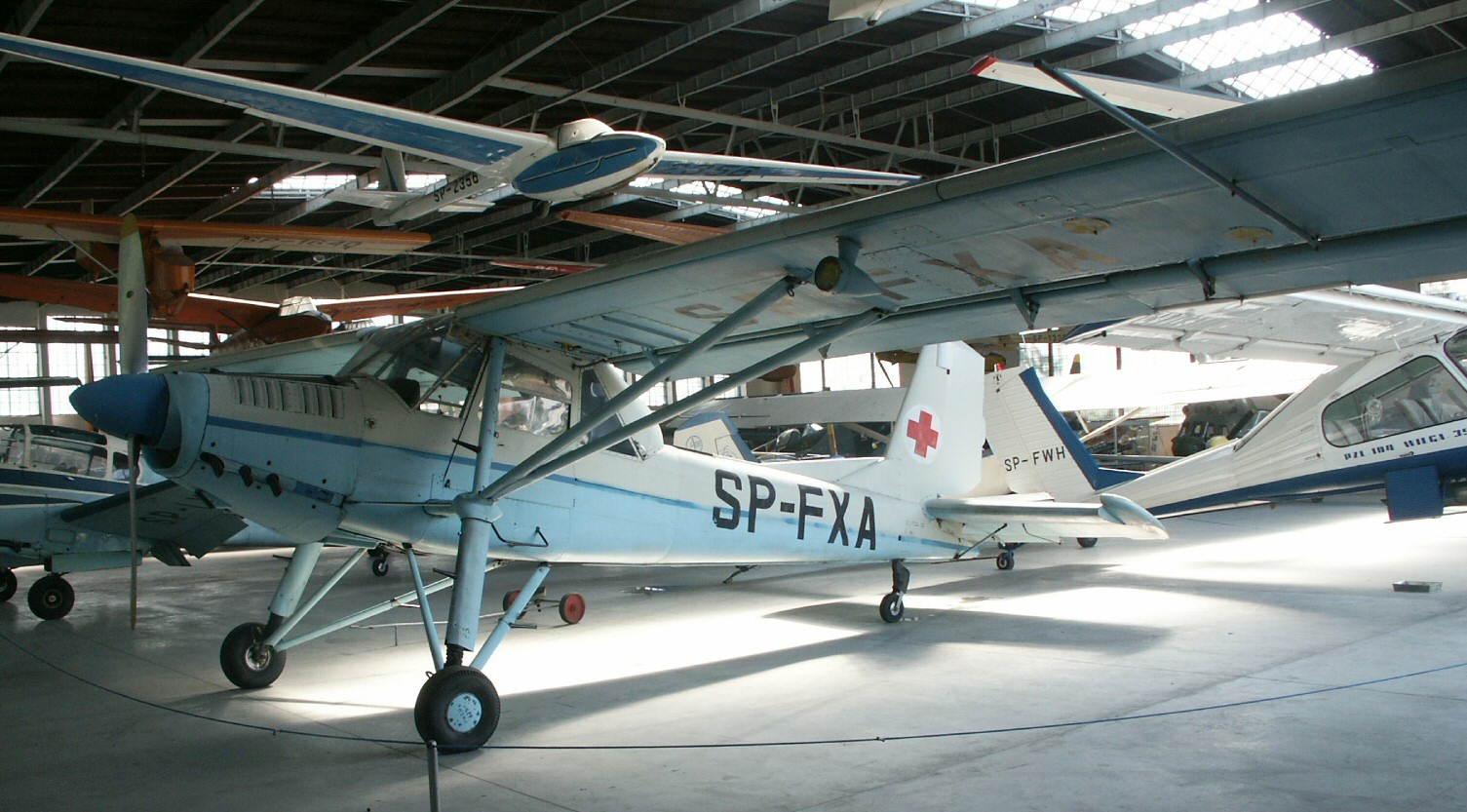
- L60 as air ambulance at the Polish Aviation Museum

General information
- Type: Utility aircraft
- Manufacturer: Aero
- Primary user: Czechoslovak aviation

History
- Manufactured: 273
- First flight: 24 December 1953

The Aero L-60 Brigadýr (Czech: Brigadier) was a small, high-wing propeller-driven Czechoslovak STOL utility aircraft developed for both civil and military use. A prototype, designated XL-60, with Argus As 10C engine, first flew on December 24, 1953, but it was not successful. The plane was thoroughly redesigned and the second improved prototype, with M-208B flat-six engine, flew on June 8, 1954. The aircraft's configuration bears a strong resemblance to the Fieseler Fi 156 "Storch" licence-produced in Czechoslovakia during and after World War II (as K-65 Čáp), and which this aircraft was intended to replace. By the end of production in 1960, 273 had been built by Aero, including an improved version, the L-160 with an all-metal tail.

Aircraft retrofitted with a PZL-built Ivchenko AI-14R radial engine are known as the L-60S.

== Variants ==
- XL-60 : Prototype.
- L-60 : Single-engined light utility transport, observation aircraft.
- L-60A : 50 production aircraft for the Czech Air Force. Also known as the K-60. Armed with MG-15 7.92 mm machine gun in a rear cab. First flew on June 24, 1955.
- L-60B : Agricultural crop spraying aircraft (300 L chemicals tank).
- L-60D : Glider tug aircraft.
- L-60E :Air ambulance aircraft.
- L-60F : Glider tug aircraft.
- L-60S : Aircraft fitted with the PZL-built 260-hp Ivchenko AI-14R radial piston engine.
- L-60SF : Fitted with the M-462RF radial piston engine.
- L-160 : Improved version with all-metal tail.

== Operators ==
=== Civil operators ===
Argentina
Austria
Bulgaria
Cuba
Czechoslovakia

- Slov-Air

East Germany
Hungary

- MÉM Flight Service used 2 L-60 (registered: HA-BRA, HA-BRB) from 1959 for short period.

New Zealand
China
Poland

- Polish Air Ambulance Service used 3 L-60F in 1957–1974

Romania
Sri Lanka
Soviet Union
United Arab Emirates
Yugoslavia

=== Military operators ===
Czechoslovakia

- Czechoslovak Air Force

East Germany

- East German Air Force
- Gesellschaft für Sport und Technik

== Specifications (L-60) ==
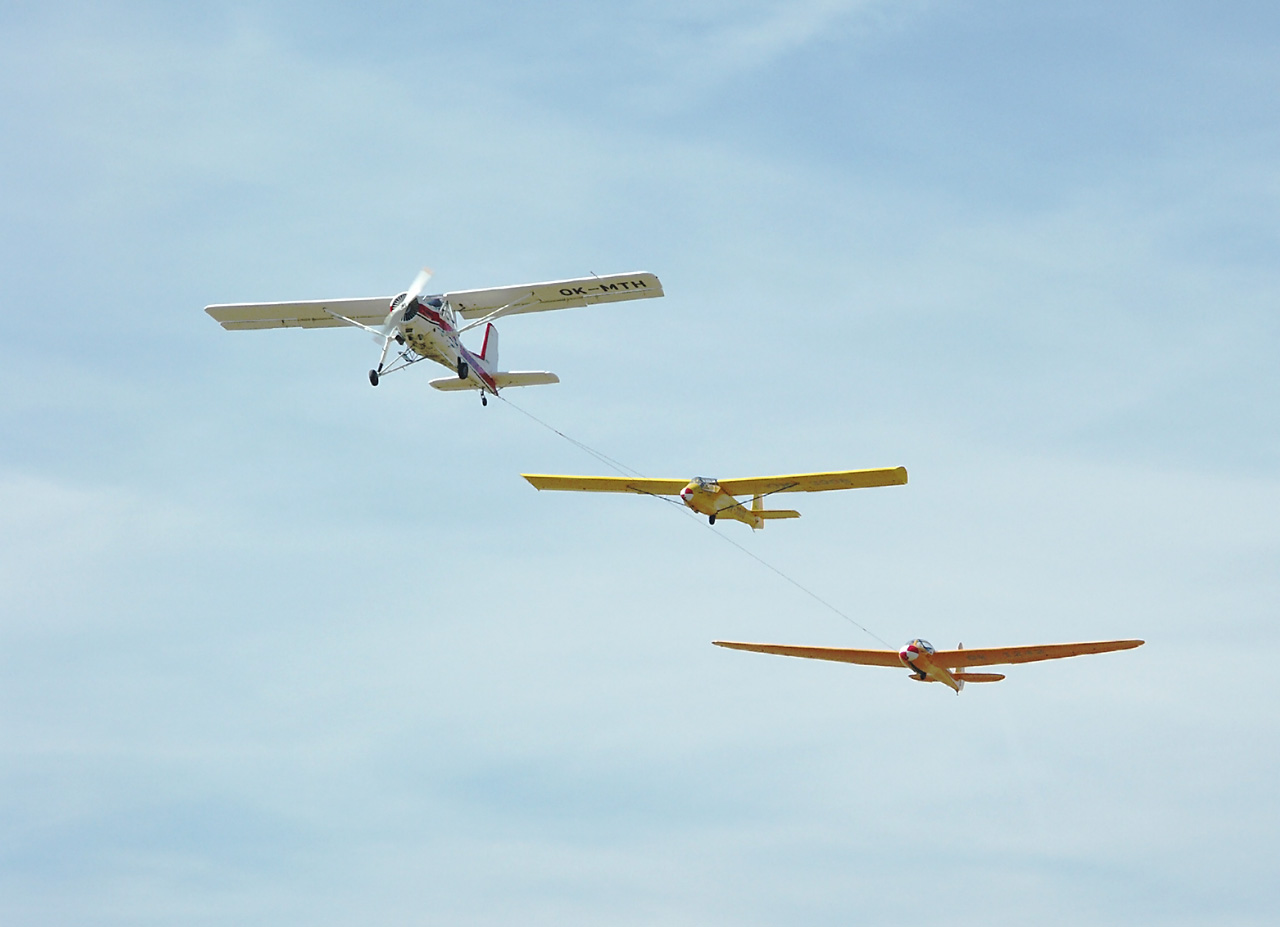
Aero L-60S aerotows historical gliders

Data from Jane's All The World's Aircraft 1961–62

General characteristics

- Crew: 1
- Capacity: 3 passengers
- Length: 8.54 m (28 ft 0 in)
- Wingspan: 13.96 m (45 ft 10 in)
- Height: 2.72 m (8 ft 11 in)
- Wing area: 24.30 m^{2} (261.6 sq ft)
- Aspect ratio: 8.07:1
- Airfoil: NACA 4412
- Empty weight: 968 kg (2,134 lb)
- Gross weight: 1,460 kg (3,219 lb)
- Max takeoff weight: 1,560 kg (3,439 lb)
- Fuel capacity: 200 L (53 US gal; 44 imp gal)
- Powerplant: 1 × Praga Doris M 208-B air-cooled flat-six engine, 140 kW (190 hp)
- Propellers: 2-bladed Type V-411 wooden controllable pitch, 2.70 m (8 ft 10 in) diameter

Performance

- Maximum speed: 193 km/h (120 mph, 104 kn)
- Cruise speed: 175 km/h (109 mph, 94 kn) at sea level
- Stall speed: 52 km/h (32 mph, 28 kn)
- Range: 720 km (450 mi, 390 nmi) at 1,000 m (3,300 ft)
- Service ceiling: 4,200 m (13,800 ft)
- Time to altitude:
  - 4.3 min to 1,000 m (3,300 ft)
  - 17.5 min to 3,000 m (9,800 ft)
- Takeoff run to 15 m (50 ft): 240 m (787 ft) (on grass)
- Landing run from 15 m (50 ft): 195 m (640 ft)

== See also ==
Aircraft of comparable role, configuration, and era

- Dornier Do 27
- Yakovlev Yak-12
