= CSS-10 (aircraft) =

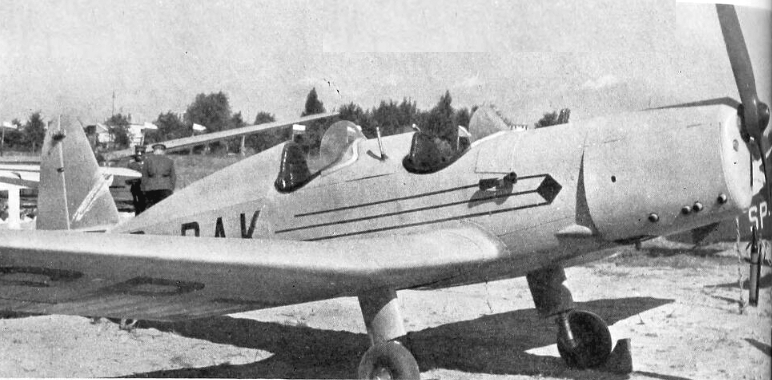
- CSS-10C

General information
- Type: Training aircraft
- National origin: Poland
- Manufacturer: Centralne Studium Samolotów (C.S.S.)
- Number built: 2

History
- First flight: 3 September 1948

The CSS-10 was a single-engine two-seat Polish training aircraft of the 1940s. It was a low-wing monoplane with a fixed conventional landing gear. Two prototypes were built, flying in 1948 and 1949, but while a production series of 40 aircraft was planned, a reorganisation of the Polish aircraft industry meant that production did not occur.

== Design and development ==
The German invasion of Poland at the start of the Second World War resulted in the destruction of Poland's aviation industry, and following the end of the war the Polish government decided to re-establish a national aviation industry. Two design bureaus were set up to design and develop prototypes, Lotnicze Warsztaty Doświadczalne (LWD) (Aircraft Experimental Workshops) at Łódź and the Centralne Studium Samolotów (C.S.S.) (Central Aircraft Study) based at Warsaw, with production to be carried out at a series of State Aircraft Factories (PZL). The C.S.S., led by Franciszek Misztal, who worked as a designer in the pre-war PZL, was tasked with the design of three types, the CSS-10, a single-engined primary trainer, an aerobatic trainer, the CSS-11 and a twin-engined feederliner, which was designated CSS-12.

Misztal's design team, which was assisted by students from the Wawelberg and Rotwand School of Engineering (now part of the Warsaw University of Technology) for whom it formed part of their diploma thesis, began work in Misztal's apartment before moving to a workshop at Warsaw Okęcie airport in the autumn of 1946. The design was completed in 1947 and the plans handed over to PZL Mielec for construction of two prototypes, the first of which, the CSS-10A was to be powered by a 65 hp (48 kW) Walter Mikron and was to be suitable for elementary training, while the second prototype, the CSS-10C, would have a more powerful (105 hp (78 kW)) Walter Minor 4-III engine and have greater aerobatic capabilities. A third version, the CSS-10B, was to have an enclosed cockpit, but this was unbuilt.

The CSS-10 was a low-wing cantilever monoplane of mixed wood and metal construction with a fixed conventional landing gear. The aircraft's fuselage was formed around a welded steel tube framework, with the forward fuselage covered by duralumin panels, and the rear fuselage covered in canvas. The student and instructor were provided with individual open cockpits, which were fitted with full dual controls, with the rear cockpit raised above the front cockpit to ensure a good downwards view from both cockpits. The wings were wooden, with a single spar, with the leading edge of the wings covered in plywood with the rest fabric covered. The wings of the CSS-10A were slightly swept back.

The first prototype, the CSS-10A, later registered SP-AAP, was flown for the first time on 3 September 1948. It was seriously overweight, partly due to overly pessimistic design of the wooden parts of the airframe, and partly due to use of out of specification materials (for example, thicker plywood was used because the specified thickness was not available). The CSS-10A could not be flown as a two-seater, and performance was poor, while the aircraft also was difficult to recover from a stall.

The CSS-10C, later registered SP-BAK, flew for the first time on 24 April 1949. The more powerful engine and other design changes transformed the aircraft. It could now operate with the intended pilot and instructor, while performance was greatly improved, with shorter take-off and faster climb. The CSS-10C could be easily recovered from a stall, and was suitable for simple aerobatics. The major criticism noted was that the use of a fixed tailskid and the lack of wheel brakes made ground handling difficult.

It was planned that 40 CSS-10Cs would be built for use by Polish aeroclubs as an intermediate trainer to follow the LWD Żak and precede the more advanced LWD Junak and LWD Zuch, with the engines being produced under license in Poland. Owing to a reorganisation of the Polish aircraft industry in 1950, which geared up the industry for mass production under license of Soviet military aircraft such as the Mikoyan-Gurevich MiG-15, LWD and the CSS were disbanded and their design offices closed, which greatly slowed the development of indigenous Polish designs. While the CSS-10 successfully passed its state trials in 1952, no production followed, as plans for license production of the Walter Minor engines in Poland had been abandoned.

The two prototypes were abandoned at Okęcie in 1952, but in 1956, an attempt was made to restore the CSS-10C to use, and it was refurbished by an aeroclub based at Okęcie airfield. The refurbishment was not complete, however, when the aeroclub workshops were closed down, with the undercarriage still to be repaired, and the CSS-10C did not receive the required permit to allow it to return to use. It was scrapped in 1960.

== Variants ==
CSS-10A
Powered by 65 hp (48 kW) Walter Mikron III engine. One prototype built.
CSS-10B
Proposed version with enclosed cockpit. Unbuilt.
CSS-10C
Powered by 105 hp (78 kW) Walter Minor 4-III engine. One prototype built.

== Specifications (CSS-10C) ==
3-view of CSS-10A

Data from Monografie: CSS-10

General characteristics

- Crew: 2
- Length: 7.55 m (24 ft 9 in)
- Wingspan: 10.58 m (34 ft 9 in)
- Height: 1.91 m (6 ft 3 in)
- Wing area: 15.73 m^{2} (169.3 sq ft)
- Empty weight: 505 kg (1,113 lb)
- Gross weight: 756 kg (1,667 lb)
- Fuel capacity: 82 L (18 imp gal; 22 US gal)
- Powerplant: 1 × Walter Minor 4-III 4-cylinder air-cooled in-line piston engine, 78 kW (105 hp)

Performance

- Maximum speed: 185 km/h (115 mph, 100 kn)
- Cruise speed: 152 km/h (94 mph, 82 kn)
- Never exceed speed: 265 km/h (165 mph, 143 kn)
- Range: 440 km (270 mi, 240 nmi)
- Service ceiling: 4,900 m (16,100 ft)
- Rate of climb: 3.5 m/s (690 ft/min)

== See also ==
Aircraft of comparable role, configuration, and era

- Zlín Z-26
- Praga E-112
- Lazarov Laz-7
