= Kharkiv KhAI-4 =

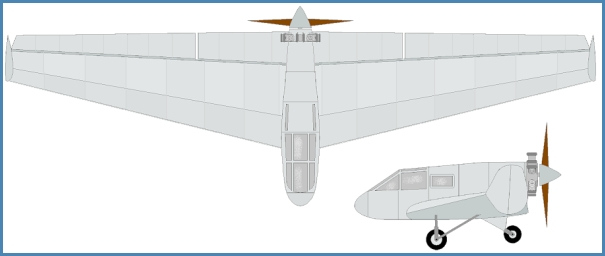

General information
- Type: Experimental tailless aircraft
- National origin: USSR
- Manufacturer: Kharkovskii Aviatsionni Institut
- Designer: P.G. Benning, A.A. Lazarev, A.A. Krol
- Number built: 1

History
- First flight: October 1934

The Kharkiv KhAI-4 was an experimental Soviet tailless aircraft tested in 1934. It only made three flights before being grounded as dangerous.

== Design and development ==
The KhAI-4 was the Kharkov Institute's first tailless design, making its first flight two years before the Kharkov KhAI-3. It was an all-wood machine.

It was rather similar in layout to the powered version of the Lippisch Delta 1, first flown three years earlier in 1931, and had similar dimensions but a much more powerful engine. Its low-mounted wing was tetragonal in plan, with sweep (15°) only on the leading edges. Wing tip fins, which had a blunted triangular profile, carried slightly more rounded rudders. Ailerons occupied the outer 65% of each wing, with the rest filled with an elevon. The controls were essentially conventional, with rudder pedals and a wheel for the ailerons which, when pushed or pulled moved the elevons together to change pitch.

Its fuselage was short but deep, with an enclosed cabin over the leading edge holding two seats in tandem. A Shvetsov M-11 radial engine, working in pusher configuration, was mounted high on the rear fuselage with its five cylinders exposed for cooling. Under the engine the fuselage was cut away.

The KhAI-4 had a conventional fixed undercarriage, though the need for propeller ground clearance required a long tailwheel leg, producing a low ground angle of attack.

== Operational history ==
The first flight was piloted by B.N. Kudrin, who found insufficient elevon authority to lift the nose for take-off until he reached 180 km/h (110 mph; 97 kn), the design maximum airspeed. Pitch instability dominated the rest of the flight, though he landed successfully. Two more flights were made before the KhAI-4 was grounded as dangerous.

== Specifications ==
Data from Russian Aircraft 1875-1995

General characteristics

- Crew: two
- Length: 4.2 m (13 ft 9 in)
- Wingspan: 12.0 m (39 ft 4 in)
- Wing area: 21.25 m^{2} (228.7 sq ft)
- Empty weight: 550 kg (1,213 lb)
- Gross weight: 850 kg (1,874 lb)
- Powerplant: 1 × Shvetsov M-11 5-cylinder air-cooled radial, 93 kW (125 hp) . Sub-type not known so power uncertain.
- Propellers: 2-bladed

Performance

- Maximum speed: 180 km/h (110 mph, 97 kn) at sea level
- Range: 600 km (370 mi, 320 nmi) design target
- Service ceiling: 3,250 m (10,660 ft) estimated service ceiling
- Landing speed: 100 km/h (62 mph; 54 kn)
