= LWD Żuraw =

1950s Polish utility aircraft

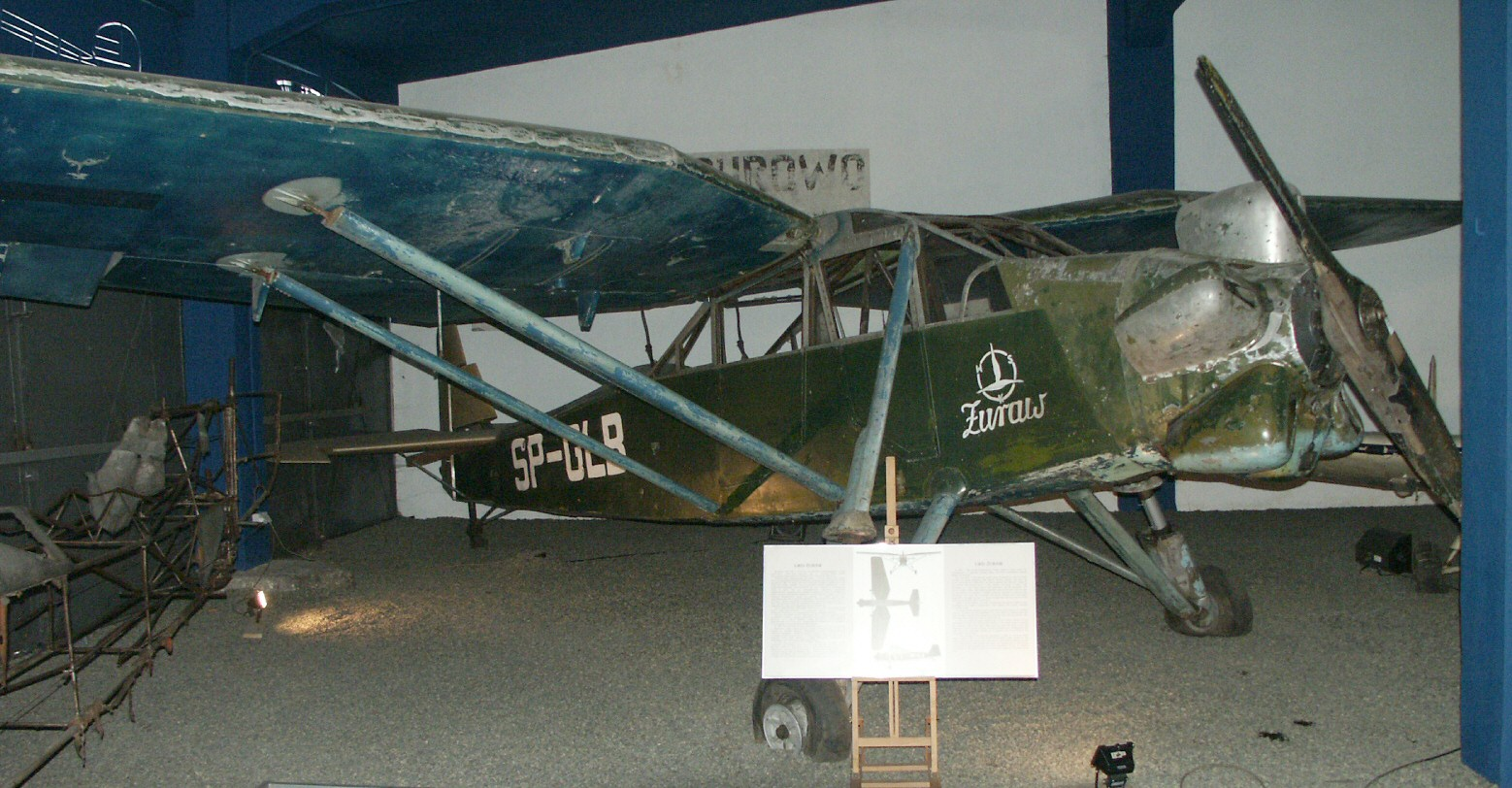
- Damaged prototype in the Polish Aviation Museum

General information
- Type: Liaison aircraft
- Manufacturer: LWD
- Primary user: Polish military aviation
- Number built: 1

History
- First flight: 16 May 1951

The LWD Żuraw was a Polish utility and liaison aircraft prototype of 1951, a high-wing monoplane with single engine, that did not enter production. The name means crane.

== Design and development ==
The aircraft was designed in 1949 by the LWD (Lotnicze Warsztaty Doświadczalne⁣ – Aircraft Experimental Workshops) as a utility and liaison aircraft for the Polish Air Force. The chief designer was Tadeusz Sołtyk. It was the last LWD design. A prototype first flew on 16 May 1951 (pilot Antoni Szymański). Because of a shortage of more powerful engines, it was fitted with the only available license-built Soviet radial Shvetsov M-11FR (118 kW, 160 hp). In addition to increased airframe weight (it was 160 kg heavier, than expected), the engine appeared too weak.

To obtain STOL capabilities, the wings had slats and flaps. The wings were thinner near the canopy to obtain a good view, and they were slightly swept forward. Despite advantages, like short takeoff and landing and low stall speed, the performance was poor and the plane was not ordered for production. It was considered to use more powerful WN-3 or Ivchenko AI-14 engines, but the design was abandoned, because Poland had bought a license to produce the Yakovlev Yak-12M.

An unusual feature was the triple tail, with two small vertical stabilizers in addition to a main central one. It was meant to improve aircraft stability at high angles of attack.

== Usage ==
The prototype was painted in Polish Air Force colours and markings, but was not used by the Polish Air Force. In 1951, it was passed to the Aviation Institute (Instytut Lotnictwa) to obtain certification of approval, and next it was used there for a couple of years. In 1952, it was given a civilian registration, SP-GLB. The prototype was withdrawn from use in 1960 and in 1963 given to the Polish Aviation Museum in Kraków, where it remains in a damaged condition.

== Specifications ==
Data from Jane's All The World's Aircraft 1956–57

General characteristics

- Crew: 1
- Capacity: 2
- Length: 8.26 m (27 ft 1 in)
- Wingspan: 11.70 m (38 ft 5 in)
- Width: 4.42 m (14 ft 6 in) (wings folded)
- Height: 2.56 m (8 ft 5 in)
- Wing area: 21 m^{2} (230 sq ft)
- Aspect ratio: 6.52:1
- Airfoil: NACA 23012
- Empty weight: 899 kg (1,982 lb)
- Gross weight: 1,157 kg (2,551 lb)
- Powerplant: 1 × Shvetsov M-11FR air-cooled 5-cylinder radial engine, 120 kW (160 hp)
- Propellers: 2-bladed wooden, 2.4 m (7 ft 10 in) diameter

Performance

- Maximum speed: 175 km/h (109 mph, 94 kn)
- Cruise speed: 140 km/h (87 mph, 76 kn)
- Range: 950 km (590 mi, 510 nmi)
- Service ceiling: 2,500 m (8,200 ft)
- Rate of climb: 2.1 m/s (410 ft/min)

== See also ==
Aircraft of comparable role, configuration, and era

- Nord 3400
- Yak-12
