= LWD Szpak =

Utility aircraft used by the Polish Air Force

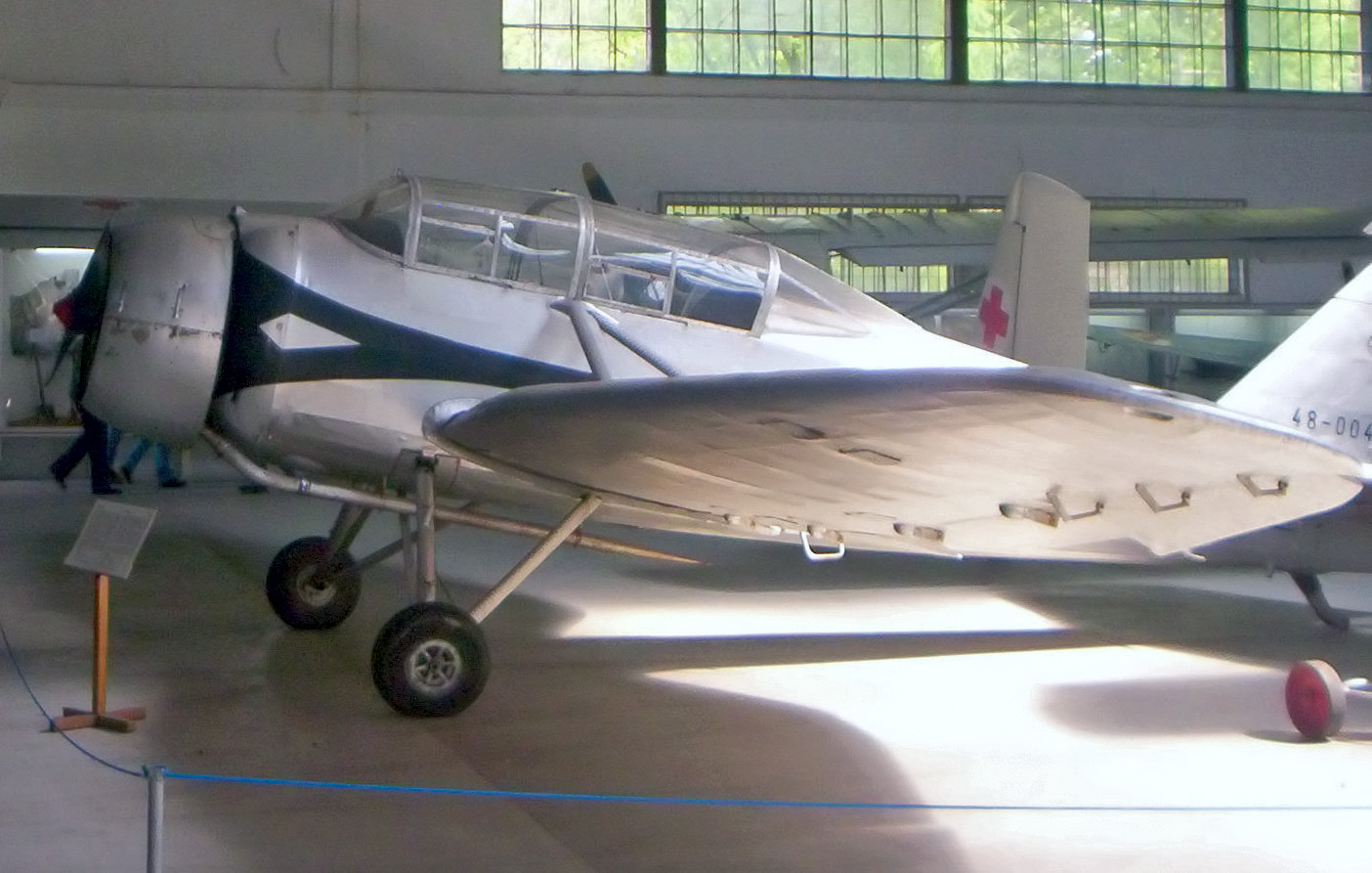
- Szpak-4T

General information
- Type: Utility aircraft
- Manufacturer: LWD, WSK-Mielec
- Designer: Tadeusz Sołtyk
- Primary user: Polish civilian aviation
- Number built: 13

History
- Manufactured: 1945–1948
- Introduction date: 1946
- First flight: October 28, 1945
- Retired: 1955

The LWD Szpak (starling) was a Polish utility aircraft of 1945, the first Polish aircraft designed after World War II and built in a short series.

== Development ==
The war destroyed the whole Polish aviation industry. As soon as the Eastern part of Poland was liberated by the Red Army in October 1944 a group of designers gathered in Lublin, under the direction of Tadeusz Sołtyk, thus creating the first Polish post-war construction team. They designed a touring low-plane aircraft of a wooden construction called Szpak-1, with a M-11F radial engine. The plane was not built, nevertheless it gave the beginning to a Szpak family. In early 1945 the construction team moved to Łódź and on April 1, 1945, created Lotnicze Warsztaty Doświadczalne (LWD, Aviation Experimental Workshops).

On October 28, 1945, the prototype of the Szpak-2 was flown for the first time; first Polish post-war civilian plane in operation. It broke its landing gear during a landing, but was repaired. The official first flight took place on 10 November 1945. Szpak was a strutted monoplane low-wing utility/touring plane of wooden construction, powered by a radial engine Bramo Sh 14, left in the country by the retreating Germans. A crew of 4 sat in a closed cab under a multi-part canopy, in two rows. Szpak-2 was not built in series, the single aircraft was used by the factory, then in 1947–1948 by the Polish government as a utility and light transport aircraft. Being the first plane registered in Poland after the war (on 10 May 1946) it carried the registration SP-AAA. It completed some 500 flights and transported some 250 passengers in total and was retired on April 5, 1948.

The Szpak-2 had a conventional fixed landing gear. On 17 December 1946, for the first time flew its improved experimental variant called Szpak-3 with a fixed tricycle landing gear (markings SP-AAB). It was not built in a series either, and the prototype was used as a courier plane by the Ministry of Foreign Affairs during 1947, then by the factory. It was retired on March 6, 1950.

The next variant, the Szpak-4A, was designed as an aerobatic aircraft. Only one prototype was built, flown on May 20, 1947. It had a steel fuselage frame rather than a wooden one, and a two-men side-by-side open cab. It was not certified as an aerobatic aircraft however, and was used by the factory as a utility plane in 1947–1948.

The only variant produced in a series was the 4-seater utility plane called Szpak-4T, utilizing the steel fuselage frame with a conventional landing gear. Contrary to Szpak-2 and 3, its fuselage was lowered behind a canopy. It was ordered by the Ministry of Communication and ten planes were built in 1947–1948 by the PZL (later WSK) in Mielec as the first Polish post-war planes built in a series. The first was flown on January 5, 1948. The planes had markings: SP-AAF to SP-AAO, and SP-AAR. They were used by the Polish civilian aviation - regional aero clubs until 1952, except for the SP-AAG, which was retired in 1955. They are also known as WSK Szpak-4T.

== Variants ==
Szpak-1
The design concept which spawned the Szpak series
Szpak-2
A version with a Bramo Sh 14 engine and portions of the wooden structure replaced with metal
Szpak-3
A tricycle undercarriage prototype

Szpak-4a

A single prototype aerobatic aircraft.
Szpak-4T
10 production aircraft.

== Operators ==
Poland

- Ministry of Foreign Affairs
- Polish Aero Club
- LWD workshops

== Surviving aircraft ==
- A Szpak 2 is on display at the Polish Aviation Museum in Kraków.
- A Szpak-3, (SP-AAB), preserved in the Polish Aviation Museum in Kraków (disassembled as of 2008)
- A Szpak-4T, (SP-AAG), is preserved in the Polish Aviation Museum in Kraków (disassembled as of 2008)

== Specifications (Szpak-4T) ==
Data from

General characteristics

- Crew: 1
- Capacity: 3 pax
- Length: 8.05 m (26 ft 5 in)
- Wingspan: 11.4 m (37 ft 5 in)
- Height: 2.4 m (7 ft 10 in)
- Wing area: 18.2 m^{2} (196 sq ft)
- Empty weight: 700 kg (1,543 lb)
- Gross weight: 1,200 kg (2,646 lb)
- Powerplant: 1 × Bramo Sh.14A-4 7-cylinder air-cooled radial piston engine, 118 kW (158 hp)
- Propellers: 2-bladed fixed-pitch propeller

Performance

- Maximum speed: 180 km/h (110 mph, 97 kn)
- Range: 630 km (390 mi, 340 nmi)
- Service ceiling: 3,350 m (10,990 ft)

== See also ==
Aircraft of comparable role, configuration, and era

- Aero A.200
