= LWD =

LWD may refer to:

- Large woody debris
- Logging while drilling, on oil wells
- Lotnicze Warsztaty Doświadczalne, a Polish aerospace manufacturer
- Leigh Warren and Dancers, now Dance Hub SA, Australian contemporary dance company
