= CSS-10 =

CSS-10 may refer to:

- CSS-10 (aircraft), a Polish training aircraft first flown in 1948
- CSS-10 (missile), the NATO reporting name for the Chinese DF-31 intercontinental ballistic missile
