= Yakovlev Yak-8 =

Prototype utility transport aircraft

- The second prototype of the Yak-8

General information
- Type: Utility aircraft
- National origin: Soviet Union
- Manufacturer: Yakovlev
- Designer: Oleg Antonov
- Status: Canceled
- Number built: 2

History
- First flight: 1944
- Developed from: Yakovlev Yak-6

The Yakovlev Yak-8 was a Soviet utility aircraft developed during World War II. It was not accepted for production, but received the NATO reporting name "Crib" anyway.

== Development ==
The Yak-8 was an improved version of the Yakovlev Yak-6. It was slightly enlarged but retained its predecessor's mixed construction and general layout. The wooden semi-monocoque forward and central fuselage sections were skinned with a 2 mm (0.079 in) layer of plywood both inside and outside. The rear fuselage was made from a tubular steel framework covered by fabric. The two-spar wooden wing was made in a single piece with fabric-covered ailerons. The main undercarriage retracted rearwards into the rear of the engine nacelles, but the castoring tailwheel was non-retractable. Two 190-horsepower (140 kW) Kossov M-12 engines were originally intended to be used, but they were unavailable and the 145-horsepower (108 kW) Shvetsov M-11FM had to be used instead. The Yak-8 was a dedicated transport so its fuselage was deeper than that of the Yak-6. This gave much more headroom for passengers and six could be accommodated rather than the four of its predecessor.

Two prototypes were built with the first flying in early 1944. The second prototype was some 250 kg (550 lb) lighter than the first one and passed its State acceptance tests. It was recommended for production, but never ordered, probably because the Soviets had begun to switch over to all-metal aircraft.

== Specifications ==
Data from Gordon et al., OKB Yakovlev: A History of the Design Bureau and its Aircraft

General characteristics

- Crew: 2
- Capacity: 6
- Length: 11.35 m (37 ft 3 in)
- Wingspan: 14.8 m (48 ft 7 in)
- Wing area: 30.0 m^{2} (323 sq ft)
- Airfoil: Clark YH
- Empty weight: 1,750 kg (3,858 lb)
- Max takeoff weight: 2,700 kg (5,952 lb)
- Fuel/oil: 340 kg (750 lb)
- Powerplant: 2 × Shvetsov M-11FM single-row, five-cylinder, air-cooled radial engine, 108 kW (145 hp) each
- Propellers: 2-bladed VISh-327

Performance

- Maximum speed: 248 km/h (154 mph, 134 kn)
- Range: 890 km (550 mi, 480 nmi)
- Service ceiling: 3,900 m (12,800 ft)
- Time to altitude: 6.4 minutes to 1,000 metres (3,281 ft)
