= G21 =

G21 may refer to:

- BMW 3 Series (G21), an automobile
- County Route G21 (California)
- Glock 21, a firearm
- Gribovsky G-21, a Soviet aircraft
- Grumman G-21 Goose, an American aircraft
- Ginetta G21, an automobile produced by Ginetta Cars
- G21 developing nations, a trade bloc also known as G20 developing nations
