= Shche =

Shche may refer to:

- Shche ne vmerla Ukrainy, the state anthem of Ukraine
- Shcherbakov Shche-2, a Soviet utility aircraft
