= CSS-12 =

General information
- Type: Airliner
- National origin: Poland
- Manufacturer: Centralne Studium Samolotów (C.S.S.)
- Number built: 1

History
- First flight: 22 November 1950

The CSS-12 was a prototype Polish twin-engined feederliner of the 1950s. A single example was built and flown in 1950, but no production followed.

== Design and development ==
The German invasion of Poland at the start of the Second World War resulted in the destruction of Poland's aviation industry, and following the end of the war the Polish government decided to re-establish a national aviation industry. Two design bureaus were set up to design and develop prototypes, Lotnicze Warsztaty Doświadczalne (LWD) (Aircraft Experimental Workshops) at Łódź and the Centralne Studium Samolotów (C.S.S.) (Central Aircraft Study) based at Warsaw, with production to be carried out at a series of State Aircraft Factories (PZL). The C.S.S., led by Franciszek Misztal, who worked as a designer in the pre-war PZL, was tasked with the design of three types, the CSS-10, a single-engined primary trainer, an aerobatic trainer, the CSS-11 and a twin-engined feederliner, which was designated CSS-12.

Work on the CSS-12 began in 1948, with the prototype making its maiden flight on 22 November 1950. It was a twin-engined low-wing cantilever monoplane of all-metal construction, the first all-metal aircraft to be built in Poland following the end of the Second World War. The oval section fuselage accommodated seats for ten passengers in two rows of five, with the two pilots sitting in an enclosed flight deck forward of the passenger cabin, while a cloakroom and baggage compartment aft of the cabin. The aircraft's wings featured a mixture of smooth and corrugated duralumin skinning, with the corrugated sections covered in fabric to reduce drag. Full-span hydraulically operated trailing-edge flaps were fitted, while engine exhaust gas was used to de-ice the wings' leading edge. The aircraft was fitted with a retractable nosewheel undercarriage. Two 440 hp (330 kW) Argus As 411 engines, built in Germany during the war, drove two-bladed constant speed propellers.

At the end of 1950, the Polish aviation industry was re-organised, with large orders being placed for license-production of Soviet Mikoyan–Gurevich MiG-15 jet fighters. As part of this reorganisation, LWD and the CSS were disbanded, and work on the CSS-12 was suspended. In 1955 flight testing of the CSS-12 resumed. Although testing was successful, with the aircraft setting an international class altitude record of 6,600 metres (21,653 ft) while carrying a payload of 1,020 kilograms (2,240 lb) on 27 December 1957, no production followed, as the CSS-12 did not meet the requirements of Poland's national airline LOT and no suitable replacements for its out-of production German engines were available. Instead, the CSS-12 formed the basis of the larger four-engined PZL MD-12 airliner which made its first flight in 1959.

== Specifications ==
Data from Jane's All The World's Aircraft 1956–57

General characteristics

- Crew: 2
- Capacity: 10 passengers
- Length: 12.5 m (41 ft 0 in)
- Wingspan: 18.5 m (60 ft 8 in)
- Height: 5.12 m (16 ft 10 in)
- Wing area: 40.10 m^{2} (431.6 sq ft)
- Aspect ratio: 8.53:1
- Airfoil: NACA 23018 (root), NACA 23009 (tip)
- Empty weight: 3,500 kg (7,716 lb)
- Gross weight: 5,500 kg (12,125 lb)
- Powerplant: 2 × Argus As 411 TA air-cooled inverted V12 engine, 330 kW (440 hp) each
- Propellers: 2-bladed Argus constant-speed metal propellers

Performance

- Maximum speed: 365 km/h (227 mph, 197 kn) at 2,400 m (7,900 ft)
- Cruise speed: 320 km/h (200 mph, 170 kn) at 2,600 m (8,500 ft)
- Range: 1,200 km (750 mi, 650 nmi)
- Service ceiling: 6,000 m (20,000 ft)
- Rate of climb: 6.5 m/s (1,280 ft/min)
