= Yakovlev Yak-6 =

Soviet twin-engined utility aircraft

Yak-6
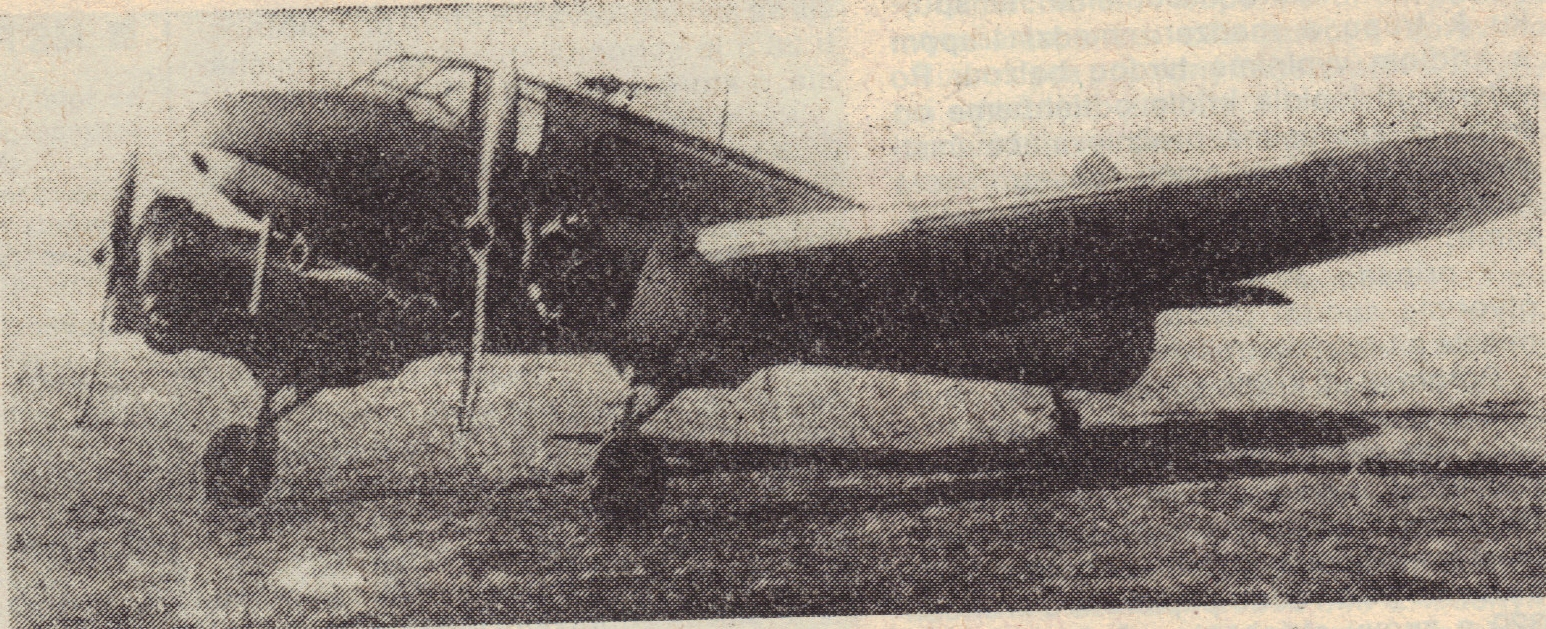

General information
- Type: Utility
- Manufacturer: Yakovlev
- Status: Retired
- Primary user: Soviet Air Force
- Number built: 381

History
- Introduction date: 1942
- First flight: 1942
- Retired: 1950

The Yakovlev Yak-6 (NATO reporting name: Crib) was a Soviet twin-engined utility aircraft, developed and built during World War II. It was used as a short-range light night bomber and a light transport.

== Development ==
In April 1942, the Yakovlev design bureau was instructed to design a twin-engined utility transport aircraft to supplement smaller single-engined aircraft such as the Polikarpov U-2. The design was required to be simple to build and operate. Design and construction work proceeded extremely quickly, with the first prototype Yak-6 flying in June 1942. It passed its state acceptance tests in September that year and was quickly cleared for production.

The Yak-6 was a cantilever low-wing monoplane of all-wood construction with fabric covering. It had a retractable tailwheel undercarriage, with the main wheels retracting rearwards into the engine nacelles. The horizontal tail was braced. It was powered by two 140 hp Shvetsov M-11F radial engines driving two-bladed wooden propellers, (Note: Yakovlev intended the Yak-6 to use 190 hp M-12 engines, but these were not available.) with the engine installation based on Yakovlev's UT-2 primary training aircraft. In order to minimise the use of scarce resources, the aircraft's fuel tanks were made of chemical-impregnated plywood rather than metal or rubber. Many Yak-6s were fitted with fixed landing gear.

The aircraft appeared in two versions, one as a transport and utility aircraft for the supply of partisans, transport of the wounded, and for liaison and courier services. It could accommodate two crew side-by-side in an enclosed cockpit with capacity to carry four passengers or 500 kg (1,100 lb) or cargo. The second version was a light night bomber (designated NBB - nochnoy blizhniy bombardirovshchik - Short Range Night Bomber), capable of carrying up to 500 kg of bombs on racks under the wing centre sections and with a defensive armament of a single ShKAS machine gun in a dorsal mounting. A total of 381 examples were built with production ending in 1943.

A few examples of an improved version of the Yak-6 with swept outer wings were flown, with the modified version sometimes known as the Yak-6M. The Yak-6M led to the larger Yak-8 which flew in early 1944.

== Operational history ==
The Yak-6 was used with great effect at the front lines in the Great Patriotic War both as a transport and as a bomber, proving popular with its crews, although the potential for the aircraft to enter a spin if overloaded or carelessly handled resulting in production ending in 1943 in favour of the similarly powered Shcherbakov Shche-2. By 1944, most operational units of the VVS had a Yak-6 as a utility aircraft. In the Battle for Berlin, the Yak-6 was fitted with rocket launchers under the wings for ten 82-mm RS-82 missiles for use against ground targets. After the end of the Second World War, some Yak-6s were supplied to allies, while it remained in large scale service with Soviet forces until 1950.

== Variants ==
- Yak-6 : Twin-engined light utility transport aircraft.
- NBB : Short-range night bomber aircraft.
- Yak-6M : Improved version of the Yak-6.

== Operators ==
France

- Normandie-Niemen squadron transport plane

Soviet Union

- Soviet Air Force

Mongolia

- Mongolian People's Army Air Force - Transports units

== Specifications (Yak-6 (1943 production)) ==
Data from Osprey Encyclopedia of Russian Aircraft

General characteristics

- Crew: two
- Capacity: four passengers
- Length: 10.35 m (33 ft 11 in)
- Wingspan: 14.0 m (45 ft 11 in)
- Wing area: 29.6 m^{2} (319 sq ft)
- Airfoil: Clark-YH
- Empty weight: 1,415 kg (3,120 lb)
- Gross weight: 2,300 kg (5,071 lb)
- Powerplant: 2 × Shvetsov M-11F 5-cylinder radial engines, 100 kW (140 hp) each

Performance

- Maximum speed: 187 km/h (116 mph, 101 kn)
- Range: 900 km (560 mi, 490 nmi)
- Service ceiling: 3,380 m (11,090 ft)
- Time to altitude: 5.4 min to 1,000 m (3,300 ft)

Armament

- Guns: 1 × ShKAS machine gun in dorsal position
- Rockets: provision for 10 × RS 82 rockets
- Bombs: Up to 500 kg (1,102 lb) bombs

== See also ==
Related development

- Yak-8

Aircraft of comparable role, configuration, and era

- Shcherbakov Shche-2
- Po-2

Related lists

- List of aircraft of World War II
