= Eugeniusz Pieniążek =

Polish pilot and engineer (1934–2020)

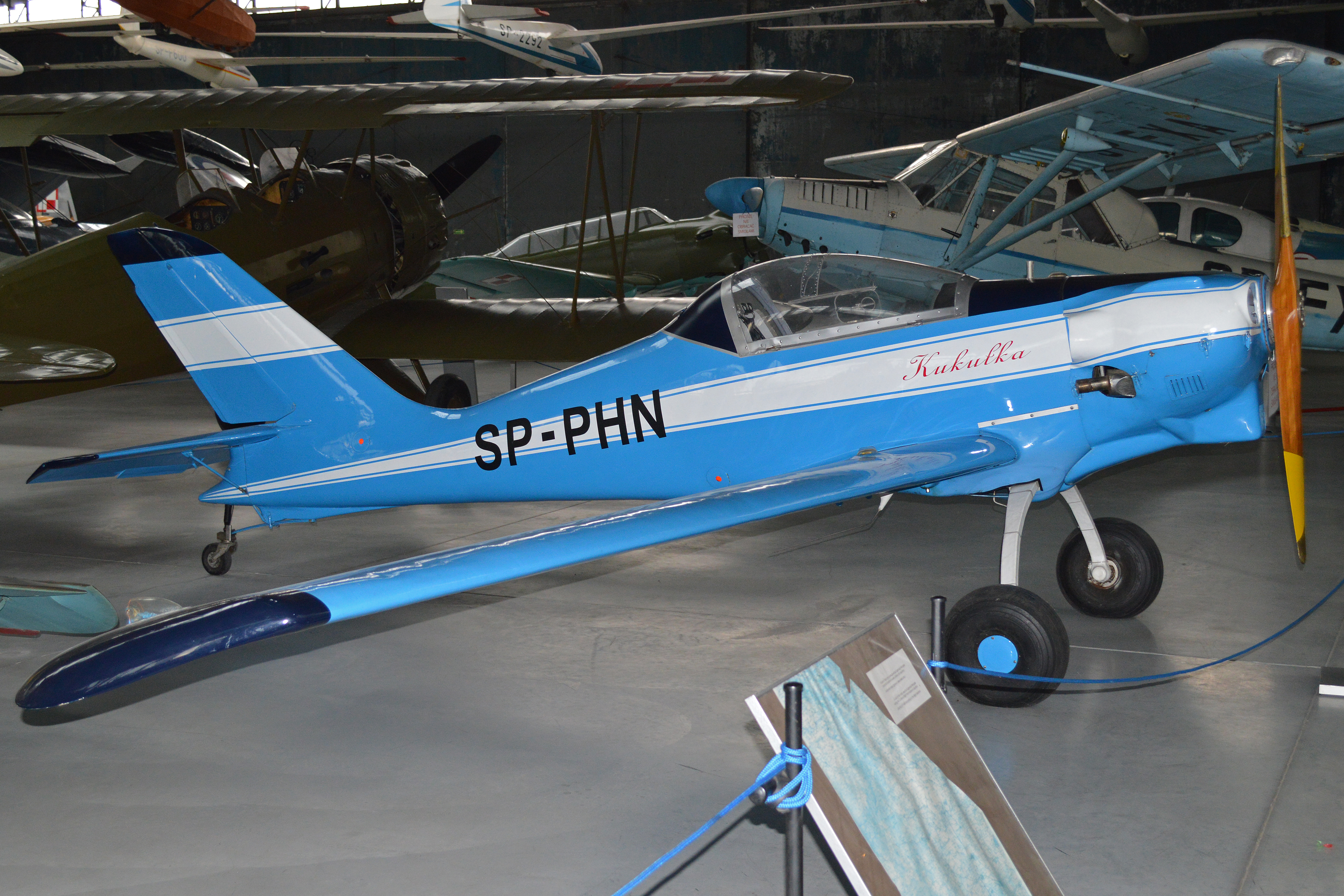
Pieniążek's Kukułka 'SP-PHN' airplane. On display in the main display hangar at the Muzeum Lotnictwa Polskiego Krakow, Poland.

Eugeniusz Pieniążek (1934-2020) was a Polish pilot and engineer. In 1971 he used an airplane Kukułka he constructed himself to escape from People's Republic of Poland, flying to Yugoslavia, from which he emigrated to Sweden.

He died on 7 February 2020.
