= Gribovsky G-20 =

General information
- Type: Two seat trainer
- National origin: USSR
- Designer: Vladislav Gribovsky
- Number built: 1

History
- First flight: 1935

The Gribovsky G-20 (Russian: ГРИБОВСКИЙ Г-20) was an aerobatic trainer, designed in the USSR in the mid-1930s. Only one was built; re-engined in 1937, it was used to train many aerobatic pilots.

== Design and development ==
The G-20 was a monoplane with a low wing of semi-elliptical plan, its greatest chord some way out from the roots. Unusually, the wing was braced from above with a pair of inverted V steel struts to a crash pylon within the enclosed forward cockpit. The wing had long, broad chord ailerons and manually operated flaps.

On its first flight, in 1935, and over its early career it was powered by a five-cylinder Shvetsov M-11 radial engine, a Soviet design which originally produced 100 hp (75 kW), enclosed in a broad chord, helmeted cowling. In 1937 performance was improved with the installation of an uprated M-11 variant, the 150 hp (112 kW) M-11 Ye. Behind the engine the fuselage was deep and rounded below. Instructor and student were in tandem cockpits under continuous, multiframed glazing that merged into a raised rear upper fuselage. Its empennage was conventional, with elliptical, mid fuselage horizontal surfaces, the tailplane braced from the upper fuselage. The fin merged smoothly into the fuselage and carried a broad, unbalanced rudder which extended own to the keel. The tailplane was far enough forward that trailing edges of the elevators were ahead of the rudder hinge.

The G-20 had a tailwheel undercarriage. Its main wheels, mounted on slender cantilever legs, were enclosed in large, deep spats.

It flew for the first time in 1935. It came third in the first All-Union light competition but was initially underpowered for its aerobatic trainer rôle. Its performance was much enhanced by the more powerful M-11 Ye engine and subsequently some seventy pilots qualified on it.

== Specifications (M-11 Ye engine) ==
Data from Gunston (1965), p.79

General characteristics

- Crew: Two
- Length: 6.3 m (20 ft 8 in)
- Wingspan: 9.7 m (31 ft 10 in)
- Wing area: 13.2 m^{2} (142 sq ft)
- Airfoil: RII
- Empty weight: 620 kg (1,367 lb)
- Gross weight: 880 kg (1,940 lb)
- Fuel capacity: 100 kg (220 lb), including oil
- Powerplant: 1 × Shvetsov M-11 Ye 5-cylinder radial, 110 kW (150 hp)

Performance

- Maximum speed: 235 km/h (146 mph, 127 kn)
- Range: 400 km (250 mi, 220 nmi) :This and below refer to original M-11 engine
- Service ceiling: 3,870 m (12,700 ft)
- Time to altitude: 11.1 min to 2,000 m (6,562 ft)
- Take off distance: 190 m (623 ft)
- Landing speed: 70 km/h (43 mph)
