= Gribovsky G-23 =

Gribovsky G-23 Komsomolyets 2

General information
- Type: Two seat experimental sports aircraft
- National origin: USSR
- Designer: Vladislav Gribovsky
- Number built: 2

History
- First flight: February 1937

The Gribovsky G-23 Komsomolyets 2 (Russian: Грибовский Г-23 Комсомолец 2) was a two-seat, single aircraft originally intended to explore the potential of a car-derived, water cooled inline engine for light aviation. It was built in the USSR in the 1930s. A second example was fitted with two different engines of greater power.

== Design and development ==
The Komsomolyets took its name from that of the Young Communists youth organisation Komsomol. It was designed to test the suitability of the GAZ-M-60 engine for light aircraft use. The M-60 was developed from the Ford derived engine used in the GAZ-M1 motor-car and was a 48 kW (65 hp) water-cooled, upright four cylinder unit and as a result the G-23 had a radiator protruding beneath its nose and a low set propeller.

Apart from its nose and its extra tandem seat, the G-23 had much in common with the single seat Gribovsky G-22. Both were low wing cantilever monoplanes with flat sided fuselages and long dorsal headrest fairings. They also shared similar elliptical vertical tails and fixed tail skid undercarriages, with each main wheel on a single leg and enclosed in a fairing. However, the G-23 was significantly larger, with a 25% greater span and 50% more wing area. The extra seat meant it was also longer.

The G-23 was completed in February 1937 and made its first flight soon after. Tests showed that though it was reasonably quick, with a maximum speed of 150 km/h (93 mph), its rate of climb was extremely low. It took 19 minutes to reach 1,000 m (3,300 ft) and about 40 minutes more to double that altitude. Despite this, it performed well in the summer of 1937 when it completed an out-and-return race from Moscow to Sebastopol, an overall distance of 2,584 km (1,606 mi), in a flight time of 21 hours. With two seats and standard fuel capacity, the G-23 had a range of 450 km (280 mi) but for this flight it was configured as a single-seater, with the forward cockpit replaced by extra tankage and faired over.

The performance of the second machine was greatly improved by the replacement of the heavy, water cooled, M-60 engine with a M-11Ye, a 112 kW (150 hp), five cylinder radial engine. It flew in 1938 and was designated the G-23bis. The new engine improved the climb rate by a factor of about twelve, the ceiling by a factor over 3 and the maximum speed by 20%. Late in 1938 this airframe was re-engined with a 63 kW (85 hp) GAZ-11, becoming known as the G-23bis-GAZ.

== Variants ==
G-23
Flown in 1937, powered by GAZ-M-60 water-cooled 4-cylinder inline engine.
G-23bis
Flown in 1938, powered by a M-11Ye five-cylinder radial engine.
G-23bis-GAZ
Flown in late 1938, powered by GAZ-11 engine.

== Specifications (Gribovsky G-23bis) ==
Data from Gunston 1995, p.80

General characteristics

- Crew: Two
- Length: 10.5 m (34 ft 5 in)
- Wingspan: 11.0 m (36 ft 1 in)
- Wing area: 14.9 m^{2} (160 sq ft)
- Powerplant: 1 × M-11Ye 5-cylinder radial engine, 110 kW (150 hp)

Performance

- Maximum speed: 179 km/h (111 mph, 97 kn)
- Service ceiling: 7,985 m (26,198 ft)
- Time to altitude: 1.5 min to 1,000 m (3,280 ft)
