= LWD Junak =

Trainer aircraft used by the Polish Air Force

LWD/WSK Junak
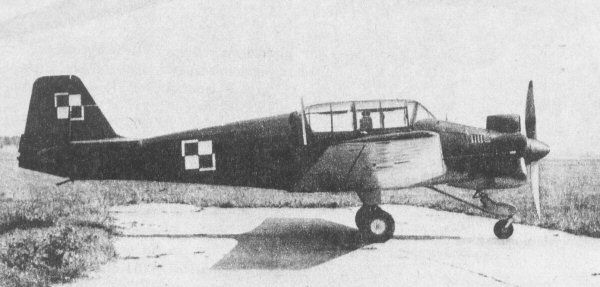
- Junak 3

General information
- Type: Trainer
- Manufacturer: WSK-Okęcie
- Designer: LWD bureau (Tadeusz Sołtyk)
- Primary users: Polish Air Force Polish Aero Club
- Number built: 252

History
- Manufactured: 1951-1956
- Introduction date: 1952
- First flight: February 22, 1948
- Retired: 1972
- Variant: LWD Zuch

The LWD/WSK Junak was a Polish trainer aircraft, used from 1952 to 1961 by the Polish Air Force and until 1972 by Polish civilian operators. It was designed by the LWD bureau and produced by the WSK Warszawa-Okęcie factory.

== Development ==
The aircraft was designed in response to a Polish Air Force requirement of 1946 for a trainer to replace the Soviet UT-2, which was obsolete. The new aircraft was designed in 1947 in the LWD (Lotnicze Warsztaty Doświadczalne - Aircraft Experimental Workshops) - the first Polish post-war construction bureau. The chief designer was Tadeusz Sołtyk. A prototype named the LWD Junak, later the Junak 1, was flown on February 22, 1948 (its name means "brave young man"). The entire design was Polish, except for the engine, which was a license-built Soviet radial, the Shvetsov M-11D (93 kW, 125 hp).

After tests, an improved variant, the Junak 2 was flown on July 12, 1949. Notable changes from the Junak 1 included the cockpit being moved forward, the fin being increased in area, a more powerful M-11FR engine (118 kW, 160 hp) was fitted and the massive landing gear covers were deleted. The plane's handling improved. The LWD team disbanded in 1950 and Junak 2 development was continued by the CSS workshops in Warsaw. After further improvements the prototype was designated the Junak-2bis, but finally entered production in 1951 as the Junak-2. Tadeusz Sołtyk was given a State Award in 1952 for the design. From 1951 to 1954, 105 Junak 2s were produced in the WSK-Okęcie in Warsaw (the first 3 in the WSK-Mielec).

Tadeusz Sołtyk, then working in the Aviation Institute (Instytut Lotnictwa - IL) in Warsaw, proposed a Junak development with a bubble canopy, retractable landing gear and other improvements, designated the TS-7 Chwat, but it was not ordered by the authorities and remained on the drawing board. Instead, when the Polish Air Force was equipped with its first jet fighters, (the Yak-23 and MiG-15), there appeared to be a need for a trainer with a tricycle landing gear. Sołtyk designed a modified Junak with a fixed tricycle landing gear and other minor improvements. This plane entered production as the TS-9 Junak 3 ("TS" standing for the designer's initials), after having first flown on August 7, 1953. The new plane was heavier, its maximum speed dropped from 223 km/h (139 mph) to 205 km/h (128 mph). Between 1953 and 1956, 146 Junak 3s were produced in WSK Warszawa-Okęcie.

Along with the Junak 1, the LWD developed a civilian trainer and aerobatics variant, the LWD Zuch. Only 5 Zuch 2s were built in 1950, powered by a 116 hp Bramo Sh 14 radial engine.

The Junak was the first aircraft mass-produced in Poland after World War II, the Polish aviation industry having been annihilated. Despite not being particularly modern, it was a stable and easy-to-handle aircraft, with an uncomfortable cockpit being one of its few flaws. On the other hand, it was considered a difficult aircraft to learn to fly, because a student in a rear cockpit had worse view. All models of Junak are generally referred to as LWD Junak or WSK Junak, while the designation TS-9 is not commonly used. The designation IL Junak 3 sometimes appears in books.

== Design ==
The aircraft was of mixed construction (steel and wood) and conventional in layout. The fuselage consisted of a steel frame, covered with canvas, in front with metal sheet. It had two-spar wings of wooden construction and a trapezoidal shape; they were covered with canvas and plywood and were fitted with split flaps. It had a two-seat cabin (front: instructor, rear: student) with a common closed canopy (front section opening to the right, rear section sliding). Landing gear was conventional (Junak 2) or tricycle (Junak 3) and fixed. A 5-cylinder M-11FR radial engine gave 119 kW (160 hp) of maximum power and 104 kW (140 hp) normal power. The cylinders have individual cowls, which were often removed. The aircraft was fitted with a two-blade fixed pitch wooden propeller. It carried 80 liters (Junak 2) or 100 liters (Junak 3) of fuel. The plane had no armament. The Junak 3 was fitted with a radio.

== Operational history ==
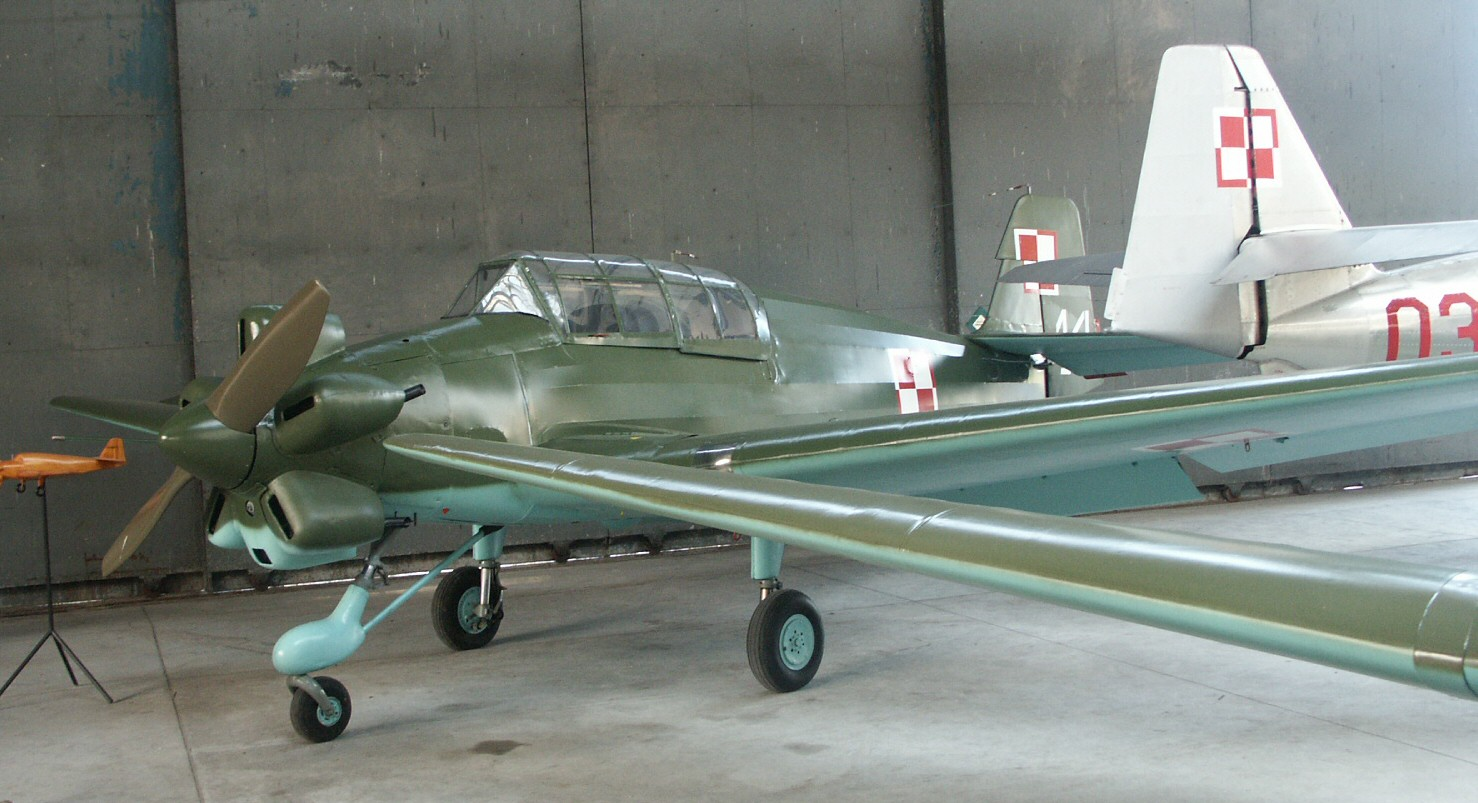
A Junak-3 in the Polish Aviation Museum

Junak 2s were used in the Polish Air Force as a basic trainer from 1952. When their replacement, with Junak 3s, started in 1954–55, the Junak 2s were withdrawn from the Air Force and handed over to civilian flying clubs.

Junak 3s were used in Polish military aviation from 1954 until 1961, when they were finally replaced with the TS-8 Bies. Starting from 1956, they were handed over to flying clubs as well.

In civilian aviation, 71 Junak 2s and 93 Junak 3s were distributed among aero clubs, who suffered a shortage of suitable aircraft after the war. They were used for pilot training and glider towing throughout the 1960s. The last Junak 2s and Junak 3s were retired in 1972.

In 1963 a group of 12 African pilot trainees from Algeria, Togo and Angola were taught to fly at Krosno, Poland, and they flew Junak 3.

== Variants ==
Junak 1
Prototype.
Junak 2
First serial produced variant, 105 aircraft built.
TS-9 Junak 3
Fixed tricycle landing gear version, 146 aircraft built.

== Operators ==
Poland

- Polish Air Force
- Polish Aero Club (APRL)

== Surviving aircraft ==
Junak-1 (SP-GLA)
Preserved in the Polish Aviation Museum in Kraków (damaged and disassembled as of 2008).
Junak-2 (SP-ADM)
Preserved in the Polish Aviation Museum in Kraków (disassembled as of 2008).
Junak-3 (SP-BPL)
Preserved in the Polish Aviation Museum in Kraków.

== Specifications (Junak 3) ==
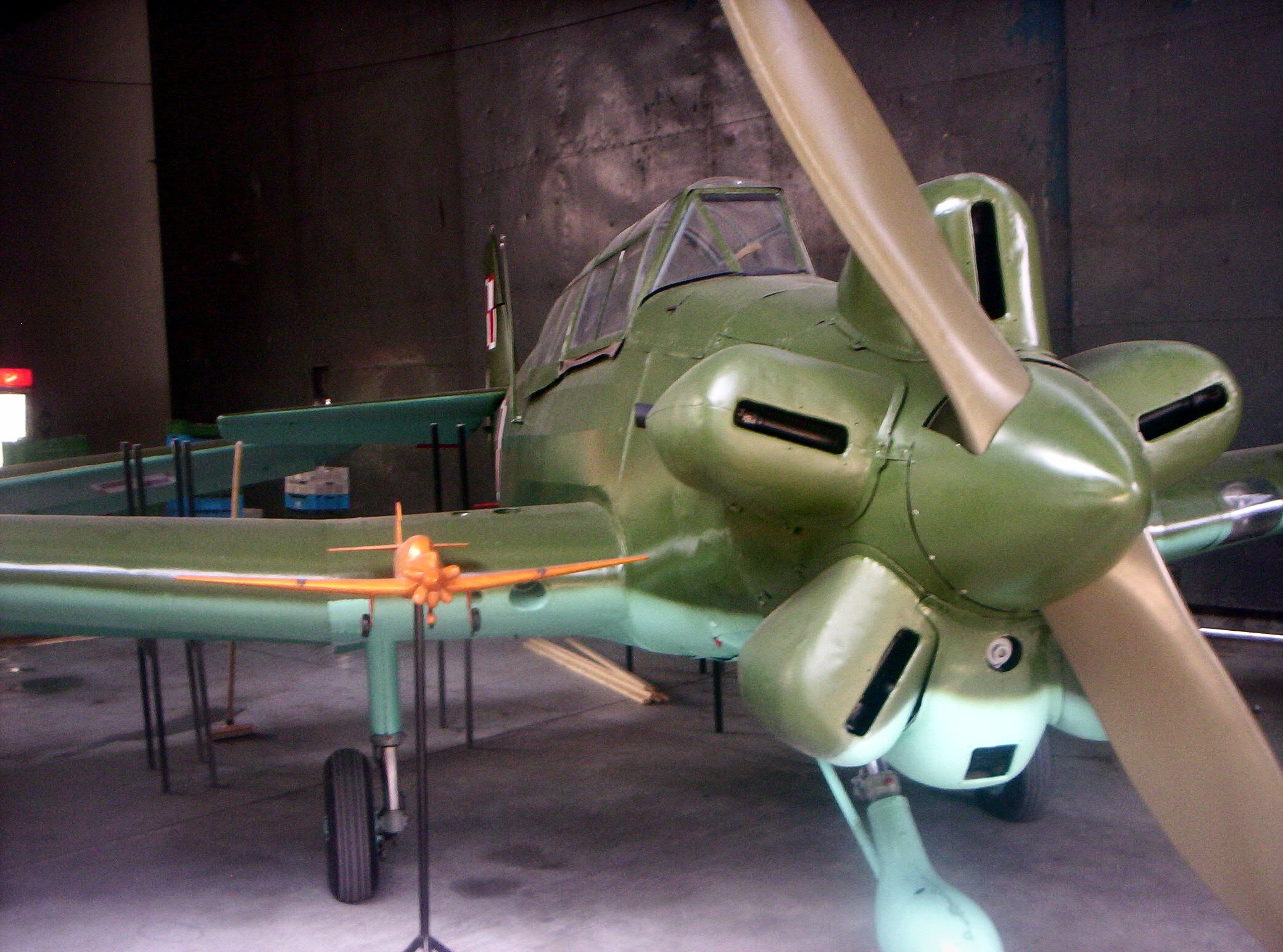
A Junak 3 in the Polish Aviation Museum in Kraków

Data from The Aircraft of the World, Jane's All the World's Aircraft 1958-59

General characteristics

- Crew: 2
- Length: 7.75 m (25 ft 5 in)
- Wingspan: 10 m (32 ft 10 in)
- Height: 2.5 m (8 ft 2 in)
- Wing area: 17.5 m^{2} (188 sq ft)
- Airfoil: root: NACA 23012; tip: NACA 23009
- Empty weight: 818 kg (1,803 lb)
- Gross weight: 1,083 kg (2,388 lb)
- Fuel capacity: 100 L (26.4 US gal; 22.0 imp gal) in port centre-section tank
- Powerplant: 1 × Shvetsov M-11FR 5-cylinder air-cooled radial piston engine, 120 kW (160 hp) maximum power at 1,900 rpm

104 kW (140 hp) rated power at 1,760 rpm

- Propellers: 2-bladed Type J-6 fixed-pitch propeller

Performance

- Maximum speed: 205 km/h (127 mph, 111 kn)
- Cruise speed: 180 km/h (110 mph, 97 kn) at 1,000 m (3,300 ft)
- Stall speed: 100 km/h (62 mph, 54 kn) flaps up
- Never exceed speed: 380 km/h (240 mph, 210 kn)
- Range: 450 km (280 mi, 240 nmi)
- Endurance: 2.5 hours
- Service ceiling: 4,100 m (13,500 ft)
- Rate of climb: 3.5 m/s (690 ft/min)
- Wing loading: 62 kg/m^{2} (13 lb/sq ft)
- Power/mass: 0.110 kW/kg (0.067 hp/lb)
- Take-off run: 155 m (509 ft)
- Landing run: 140 m (460 ft)

== See also ==
Related development

- LWD Zuch

Aircraft of comparable role, configuration, and era

- CAC Winjeel
- De Havilland Chipmunk
- Fiat G.49
- Macchi M.B.323
- Percival Prentice
- Percival Provost
- Piaggio P.150
- Yakovlev Yak-11
- Yakovlev Yak-18
- Zlin Z-26 Trener
