= Gribovsky G-27 =

General information
- Type: Three seat multi-purpose twin engine aircraft
- National origin: USSR
- Manufacturer: Vladislav Gribovsky
- Number built: 1

History
- First flight: 1939

The Gribovsky G-27 (Russian: Грибовский Г-27) was a light, economical, twin engined, multi-role aircraft built in the USSR in 1938-9. It did not reach production.

== Design and development ==
The G-27 was the only Gribovsky design with more than one engine. It was a wooden multi-purpose monoplane, intended to provide training in navigation and photo-reconnaissance for its crew of three as well as filling light transport and air ambulance rôles. In plan its wing had a rectangular centre section and straight tapered, two spar outer panels with rounded tips. The outer panels carried slotted ailerons and the centre section pneumatically operated split flaps.

The G-27's twin 75 kW (100 hp) Shvetsov M-11 five cylinder radial engines were mounted at the outer ends of the centre section, with their cylinders projecting for cooling and driving twin blade propellers. The main legs of the tailwheel undercarriage were under the engines. On the first flight the legs were fixed and enclosed with trouser fairings but during development the fairings were removed and later retractable legs were introduced. Skis could be substituted for the wheels for winter use. The G-27 had a fixed tailwheel positioned ahead of the empennage.

Its fuselage was a narrow wooden monocoque which tapered rapidly over its rearmost 30%. From the nose to the start of taper there were three sections of multi-piece glazing beginning with the blunt, deep nose followed by separate upper glazing between the nose and cockpit. The latter was glazed in two continuous parts which ran smoothly into the rear upper fuselage. The nose region was occupied by the navigator, who also served as front gunner and bomb aimer; light bombs could be carried under the wing centre section. The G-27 was routinely flown from the front cockpit; it could also be piloted from the rear one, though forward visibility was not good. Usually it was occupied by the radio operator/observer.

The G-27's empennage was conventional. A parabolic vertical tail, with a trim tab equipped balanced rudder, reached aft to the extreme fuselage. A small gap between fuselage and the bottom of the rudder allowed upward deflections of the balanced, tabbed elevators mounted on a tailplane with a strongly swept leading edge, positioned at mid-fuselage height.

Design of the G-27 began in 1938 and the aircraft made its first flight the following year, piloted by N.D. Fedoseev. In 1941 the original M-11 engines were replaced with the developed and much more powerful M-11 Ye variant, which produced 112 kW (150 hp). The upgrade only improved the maximum speed by 4%, but the ceiling was raised by 25% and the useful load by about 50%. Despite its promise, the G-27 did not go into production, priority being given to the Gribovsky G-29 (G-11) assault glider.

== Specifications (M-11 engines) ==
Data from Gunston (1995), p.81

General characteristics

- Crew: Three
- Length: 6.99 m (22 ft 11 in)
- Wingspan: 10.6 m (34 ft 9 in)
- Wing area: 17.0 m^{2} (183 sq ft)
- Empty weight: 900 kg (1,984 lb)
- Gross weight: 1,300 kg (2,866 lb)
- Fuel capacity: 130 kg (287 lb) with oil
- Powerplant: 2 × Shvetsov M-11 5-cylinder radial, 75 kW (100 hp) each
- Propellers: 2-bladed

Performance

- Maximum speed: 240 km/h (150 mph, 130 kn)
- Range: 350 km (220 mi, 190 nmi)
- Service ceiling: 4,000 m (13,000 ft)
- Landing speed: 80 km/h (50 mph)
