= LWD Żak =

1940s Polish light aircraft

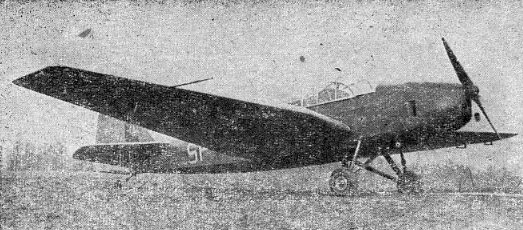

General information
- Type: Touring and trainer aircraft
- Manufacturer: LWD
- Designer: Tadeusz Sołtyk
- Primary user: Polish civilian aviation
- Number built: 13

History
- Manufactured: 1947-1948
- Introduction date: 1947
- First flight: 23 March 1947
- Retired: 1955

The LWD Żak was a Polish touring and trainer aircraft of the late 1940s, designed in the LWD and built in a short series.

== Design and development ==
The Żak (old-fashioned "student") was designed in the Lotnicze Warsztaty Doświadczalne (LWD, Aviation Experimental Workshops) in Łódź, directed by Tadeusz Sołtyk in 1946, as one of the first Polish post-war aircraft. It was a light low-wing cantilever monoplane of a mixed construction, with a crew of two, sitting side by side, and fixed conventional landing gear. The first prototype Żak-1 was first flown on March 23, 1947. It was powered by the Czechoslovak 65 hp straight engine Walter Mikron III and carried markings SP-AAC. The second prototype Żak-2 was powered by the 65 hp flat engine Continental A-65 and had an open cockpit. It was flown on November 27, 1947, and carried markings SP-AAE.

The design appeared successful and the Ministry of Communication ordered a series of 10 aircraft. They were to be powered by licence-built A-65 engines, but since plans of engine production were abandoned, it was decided to fit them with Walter Mikron engines. They were also fitted with a closed canopy, sliding rearwards, and named Żak-3. Ten planes were built by the LWD in the end of 1948, the first of them was flown on November 8, 1948. They had markings: SP-AAS to SP-AAZ, and SP-BAA to SP-BAC. At least one (SP-AAX) had engine replaced later with 85 hp (63 kW) Cirrus F.III. They were used in the Polish regional aero clubs until 1955.

On October 20, 1948, there was flown a prototype of the last variant, Żak-4, meant for a glider towing. It had stronger 105 hp Walter engine and an open canopy. Since it showed unsuitable for glider towing, and old Polikarpov Po-2 appeared the better plane for this purpose, Żak-4 was not built in series, and the prototype was re-fitted with a closed canopy and used as a touring plane in aero club (markings SP-BAE).

== Variants ==
Żak-1 (SP-AAC)
The first prototype powered by Walter Mikron III engine.
Żak-2 (SP-AAE)
The second prototype without canopy and powered by Continental A-65 engine.
Żak-3
Main production version with closed canopy and powered by Walter Mikron III engine, 10 built.
Żak-4 (SP-BAE)
Prototype of the glider towing version with open canopy (later refitted with a closed one) and powered by Walter engine.

== Operators ==
Poland

- Aeroklub Polski

== Survivors ==
Żak-3 SP-AAX is preserved in the Polish Aviation Museum in Kraków (disassembled as for 2007)

== Specifications (Żak-3) ==
Data from Jane's All The World's Aircraft 1953-54

General characteristics

- Crew: 2
- Length: 7.60 m (24 ft 11 in)
- Wingspan: 11.80 m (38 ft 9 in)
- Height: 1.95 m (6 ft 5 in)
- Wing area: 17.0 m^{2} (183 sq ft)
- Empty weight: 400 kg (882 lb)
- Gross weight: 620 kg (1,367 lb)
- Powerplant: 1 × Walter Mikron III air-cooled 4-cylinder straight engine, 48 kW (65 hp)

Performance

- Maximum speed: 160 km/h (99 mph, 86 kn)
- Cruise speed: 130 km/h (81 mph, 70 kn)
- Stall speed: 62 km/h (39 mph, 33 kn)
- Range: 400 km (250 mi, 220 nmi)
- Service ceiling: 3,500 m (11,500 ft)
- Rate of climb: 2.7 m/s (530 ft/min)

== See also ==
Aircraft of comparable role, configuration, and era

- Bücker Bü 181
- RWD-21
- Zlin Z-22 Junak
