= LWD Zuch =

1940s Polish light aircraft

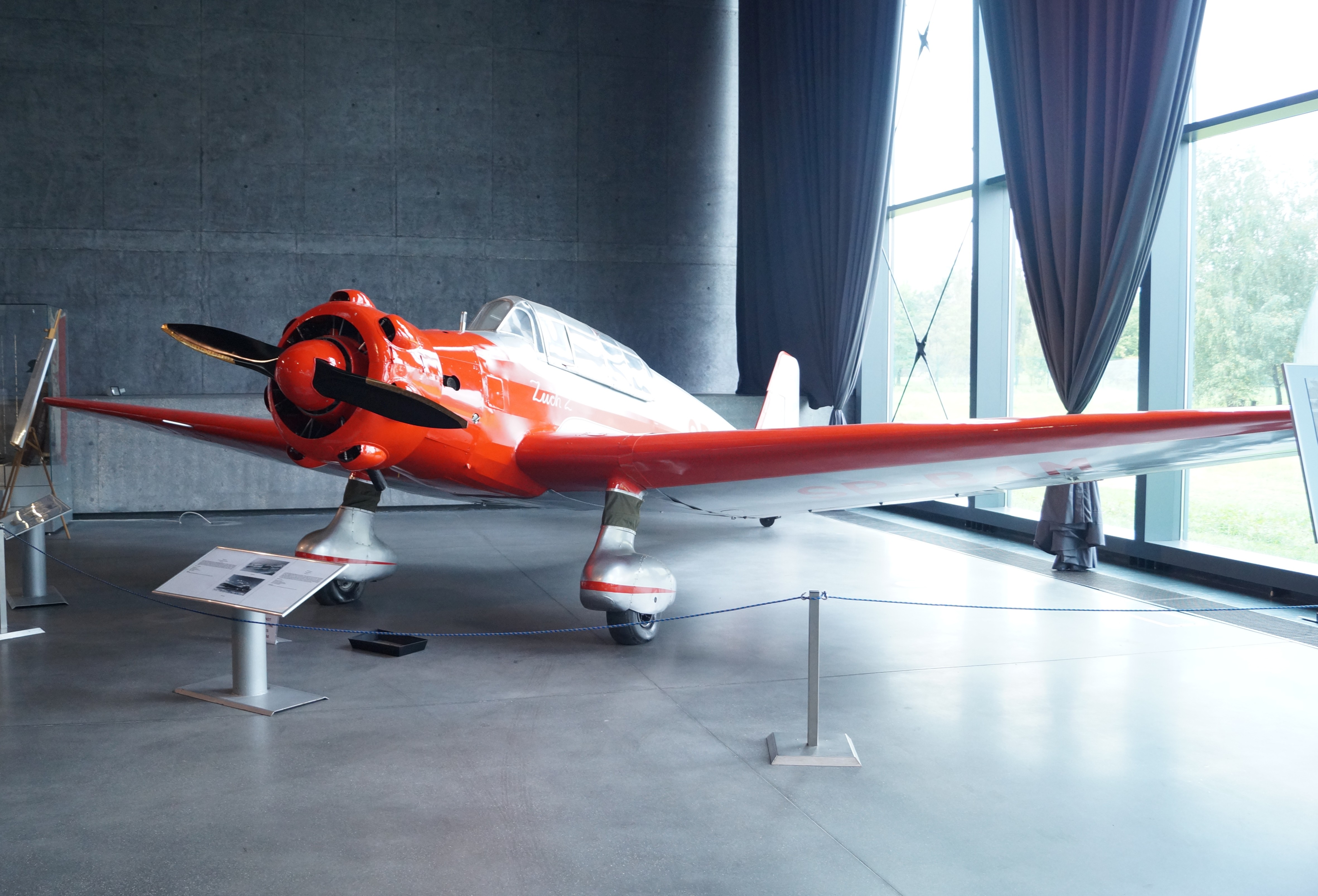

General information
- Type: Trainer/aerobatics aircraft
- Manufacturer: Lotnicze Warsztaty Doświadczalne
- Primary user: Poland
- Number built: 7

History
- Manufactured: 1948-1950
- Introduction date: 1949
- First flight: 1 September 1948
- Retired: 1963
- Developed from: LWD Junak-1

The Zuch was a Polish aerobatics and trainer aircraft, built in 1948 in the LWD bureau and produced in a small series.

== Design and development ==
The aircraft was a development of a military and civilian trainer plane LWD Junak-1, meant as a civilian aerobatics and trainer plane for the Polish Aero Club. It was designed in the Lotnicze Warsztaty Doświadczalne (LWD - Aircraft Experimental Workshops), a main designer was Tadeusz Sołtyk. The design was similar to Junak-1, the main difference was en engine. Unlike Junak, its fixed landing gear, in massive covers, was lacking struts. It was also fitted with split flaps and had slightly enlarged rudder (similar improvements were later adapted in Junak-2).

=== Description ===
Mixed construction (steel and wood) low-wing monoplane, conventional in layout. Fuselage of a steel frame, covered with canvas, in front with metal sheet. Two-spar wings of wooden construction and trapezoid shape, canvas and plywood covered, fitted with split flaps. Cockpit with two seats in tandem, under a multi-part closed canopy. Conventional fixed landing gear with a tail wheel, main gear in massive covers. Engine in front: Zuch-1: 6-cylinder inline engine Walter Minor 6-III (118 kW / 160 hp), Zuch-2: 7-cylinder radial engine Bramo Sh 14 (118 kW / 160 hp) with a ring cover with individual cowls for cylinders. Two-blade wooden propeller.

The first variant Zuch-1 was powered by the Czechoslovak 160 hp Walter Minor 6-III inline engine in a long, slant nose. The prototype flew first on September 1, 1948. The design was quite successful and fit to aerobatics, but it did not enter production because of decision not to produce Walter Minor engines in Poland. The prototype served in aero clubs from 1950 until end of 1955, with markings SP-BAD.

The second prototype Zuch-2 was fitted with a radial engine Bramo Sh 14. It was flown on April 1, 1949 and carried markings SP-BAG. Because of increased drag, maximum speed was lower - 222 km/h comparing to 244 km/h of Zuch-1. Because there were several Sh 14 engines available, left in the country by retreating Germans, the LWD next built a short series of 5 Zuch-2s in 1950. They carried markings SP-BAL - SP-BAP and served in aero clubs until 1955, except SP-BAM, which served until 1963.

== Operators ==
Poland

- Aeroklub Polski

== Surviving aircraft ==
Zuch-1 (SP-BAD)
Preserved in the Polish Aviation Museum in Kraków (damaged and disassembled).
Zuch-2 (SP-BAM)
Preserved in the Polish Aviation Museum in Kraków (disassembled).
Zuch-2 (SP-BAO)
Preserved in the Polish Aviation Museum in Kraków (incomplete and disassembled).

== Specifications (Zuch 2) ==
Data from Monografie: LWD Junak a Zuch

General characteristics

- Crew: 2
- Length: 7.61 m (25 ft 0 in)
- Wingspan: 9.91 m (32 ft 6 in)
- Height: 2.10 m (6 ft 11 in)
- Wing area: 17.50 m^{2} (188.4 sq ft)
- Empty weight: 638 kg (1,407 lb)
- Gross weight: 1,020 kg (2,249 lb)
- Powerplant: 1 × Bramo Sh 14 7-cylinder air-cooled radial piston engine, 120 kW (160 hp)
- Propellers: 2-bladed propeller

Performance

- Maximum speed: 222 km/h (138 mph, 120 kn)
- Cruise speed: 181 km/h (112 mph, 98 kn)
- Range: 1,160 km (720 mi, 630 nmi)
- Service ceiling: 4,750 m (15,580 ft)
- Rate of climb: 3.65 m/s (719 ft/min)

== See also ==
Related development

- LWD Junak

Aircraft of comparable role, configuration, and era

- Zlin Z-26 Trener
