= Gribovsky G-15 =

General information
- Type: Two seat tourer
- National origin: USSR
- Designer: Vladislav Gribovsky
- Number built: 1

History
- First flight: 1934

The Gribovsky G-15 (Russian: Грибовский Г-15) was a single engine, side-by-side two seat touring aircraft built in USSR in the 1930s. Only one was completed.

== Design and development ==
The G-15 inherited the monocoque fuselage and low, two spar, partially plywood covered wings of the earlier G-5 and G-8 but was a bigger and heavier aircraft, the first Gribovsky had designed for touring rather than sport and training. Unlike the smaller machines the G-15 had seats for two, arranged side-by-side.

Following earlier Gribovsky practice, the wing centre section was an integral part of the circular cross-section fuselage and, like it, was ply covered. The outer wing panels were ply covered from the leading edge back to the rear spar, with the rest fabric covered. In plan the wings were strongly tapered, mostly on the trailing edges, and ended in long, elliptical tips. Their trailing edges carried slotted flaps inboard; slotted ailerons filled the rest of the span. Fuel tanks were located between the spars, two in each wing, each with a capacity of 350 kg (770 lb).

The G-15 was powered by a 115 kW (154 hp) Shvetsov M-11 five cylinder radial engine driving a two blade propeller, housed under a broad chord NACA cowling. The cockpit was over the wing, with a fairing behind it dropping smoothly to the underlying fuselage line. The fin, also ply covered and an integral part of the fuselage, had a curved leading edge and carried a slightly taller, unbalanced rudder. A straight edged tailplane, mounted mid-fuselage, carried rounded elevators. Both rudder and elevators were fabric covered. The G-15 had a fixed, wide track tail skid undercarriage, with its vertical, wing-mounted main legs in trouser type fairings which widened to form spats enclosing the wheels.

The G-15 was built at the glider works in Moscow in 1934. Both its design and performance were praised but, like most of Gribovsky's designs, it was not put into production. The sole example is known to have made a successful forced landing after an engine failure during a 1935 flight near Moscow, but it is not known if it flew again.

== Specifications ==
Data from The Osprey Encyclopedia of Russian Aircraft

General characteristics

- Capacity: Two
- Length: 6.2 m (20 ft 4 in)
- Wingspan: 11.0 m (36 ft 1 in)
- Wing area: 14.0 m^{2} (151 sq ft)
- Empty weight: 670 kg (1,477 lb)
- Gross weight: 940 kg (2,072 lb)
- Fuel capacity: 92 kg (203 lb)
- Powerplant: 1 × Shvetsov M-11 5-cylinder radial engine, 86 kW (115 hp) approximately. Engine sub-type and exact power unknown.
- Propellers: 2-bladed

Performance

- Maximum speed: 185 km/h (115 mph, 100 kn)
- Range: 1,400 km (870 mi, 760 nmi)
- Service ceiling: 4,500 m (14,800 ft)
- Landing speed: 75 km/h (47 mph)
