= Gribovsky G-21 =

General information
- Type: Two/three seat cabin monoplane
- National origin: USSR
- Designer: Vladislav Gribovsky
- Number built: 1

History
- First flight: 1936

The Gribovsky G-21 (Russian: ГРИБОВСКИЙ Г-21) was a single engine cabin monoplane designed and built in the USSR in the mid-1930s. Intended for touring and civil utility rôles, only one was completed.

== Design and development ==
The G-21 had much in common with that of the earlier G-15, a two-seat touring aircraft, with a two spar wing of similar construction and geometry and a monocoque fuselage. The G-15's side-by-side cockpit was replaced with an enclosed cabin able to seat two or three. Suggested rôles included that of air ambulance.

Like the G-15 it had a completely plywood covered wing centre section which was an integral part of the fuselage. The outer wing panels were ply covered from the leading edge back to the rear spar, with the rest fabric covered. In plan the wings were strongly tapered, mostly on the trailing edges, and ended in long, elliptical tips. Its automatic leading edge slats were interconnected through the fuselage with a steel tube and its ailerons were slotted.

The G-21 was powered by a five-cylinder 112 kW (150 hp) M-11Ye radial engine, installed with its cylinders projecting out of the smooth cowling for cooling and driving a two blade propeller. Behind the engine the fuselage was smoothly ply covered. The front of the cabin was over the leading edge, with panelled glazing that extended aft to about three-quarters chord. The G-21's cabin roof line extended rearwards unbroken, tapering only slightly to the tail, where a forward set, mid-fuselage mounted tailplane was braced on each side by a single strut to the fin-fuselage junction. The fin and unbalanced rudder had a curved profile; the rudder was broad and extended down to the keel.

The G-21 had a tail skid undercarriage; like the G-15, its legs were attached to the end of the wing centre section with wheels mostly enclosed in large round profile spats. The tail skid was also faired.

It made its first flight in 1936. Equipped with extra fuel tanks, it made several notable long distance flights.

== Specifications ==
Data from Gunston (1995), p.79

General characteristics

- Capacity: Two/three
- Length: 7.0 m (23 ft 0 in)
- Wingspan: 11.0 m (36 ft 1 in)
- Wing area: 14.0 m^{2} (151 sq ft)
- Empty weight: 705 kg (1,554 lb)
- Gross weight: 980 kg (2,161 lb)
- Fuel capacity: 105 kg (231 lb) (standard tanks)
- Powerplant: 1 × M-11Ye 5-cylinder radial, 110 kW (150 hp)
- Propellers: 2-bladed

Performance

- Maximum speed: 220 km/h (140 mph, 120 kn)
- Range: 500 km (310 mi, 270 nmi)
- Service ceiling: 4,760 m (15,620 ft)
- Time to altitude: 5.6 min to 1,000 m (3,280 ft)
- Landing speed: 70 km/h (43 mph)
