= Kharkiv KhAI-3 =

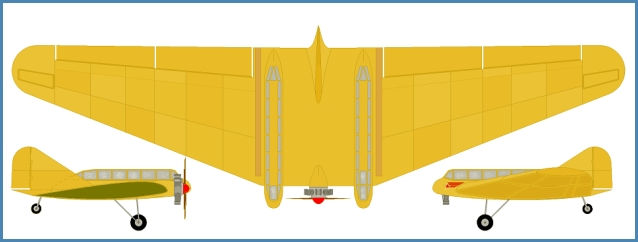

General information
- Type: motor glider transport
- National origin: USSR
- Manufacturer: Kharkovskii Aviatsionni Institut
- Designer: Alexandr Alekseyevich Lazerev
- Number built: 1

History
- First flight: 14 September 1936

The Kharkiv KhAI-3 or Aviavnito-3 was one of several Soviet mid-1930s motor glider transports intended to reduce transport costs.

== Design and development ==
Alexandr Alekseyevich Lazerev, who led the Kharkiv KhAI-3 Avianvito design team, was already familiar with the problems posed by tailless aircraft. He was on the team which designed the almost uncontrollable KhAI-4 two years before (the Institute's designs did not always appear in their numerical order). That aircraft was grounded after just three flights for being dangerous.

The much larger KhAI-3 was intended to show that low-powered aircraft could carry a useful eleven-passenger load with an engine of just over 100 hp (75 kW).

It was a tailless aircraft with a broad-chord wing and with a tractor engine, fin and rudder all on the centreline. Though there were initial thoughts of mounting the KhAI-3's Shvetsov M-11 five cylinder radial engine on a pylon over the wing, it was finally placed ahead of the leading edge on steel tubes running from the front wing spar and fed from four tanks in the wing. There were two long, six seat cabins on each side of the centerline, with the pilot in the first portside seat. The large, triangular fin mounted a broad, round-topped rudder.

Its wing center section was rectangular in plan, with a steel tube four spar structure and dural skinning. It had a chord of 5.0 m (16.4 ft) and a chord/thickness ratio of 14%. The outer panels making up 82% of the span, were all-wood with dihedral and 16° of sweep on the leading edge only. The panels decreased in thickness outwards from 14% to 7%, with 8° washout. Each wing carried three control surfaces. Near each tip, at midchord and parallel to the leading edge there was a rectangular air brake which were operated differentially by pedals which also controlled the rudder to assist in making turns. Inboard of the air brakes, each outer panel trailing edge carried two broad-chord control surfaces that acted as both ailerons and elevators.

The Kharkiv KhAI-3 had a fixed, tailwheel undercarriage. Its forward-mounted engine and propeller allowed a short tailwheel to provide a ground angle of attack of 15°, avoiding one of the problems encountered with the KhAI-4.

== Operational history ==
The first flight was made on 14 September 1936. On this occasion the front seats of both cabins were equipped with dual controls; the pilots were V. A. Borodin and E. I. Schwartz. During this and subsequent flights, controlled turns proved difficult however the various control surfaces were combined. A long development programme yielded significant improvements.

The 1937 Aviavnito-8 was a proposed but unflown development with the same passenger capacity, dimensions and engine.

== Specifications ==
Data from Russian Aircraft 1875-1995

General characteristics

- Crew: one
- Capacity: eleven passengers
- Length: 6.8 m (22 ft 4 in)
- Wingspan: 22.4 m (73 ft 6 in)
- Wing area: 78.6 m^{2} (846 sq ft)
- Aspect ratio: 6.4
- Airfoil: V-106, thinning outwards from 14% to 7%
- Empty weight: 1,440 kg (3,175 lb)
- Gross weight: 2,200 kg (4,850 lb)
- Powerplant: 1 × Shvetsov M-11 5-cylinder air-cooled radial, 93 kW (125 hp) . Sub-type not known so power uncertain.

Performance

- Maximum speed: 135 km/h (84 mph, 73 kn)
- Cruise speed: 115 km/h (71 mph, 62 kn)
- Range: 850 km (530 mi, 460 nmi)
- Service ceiling: 2,000 m (6,600 ft)
- Time to altitude: 25 min to 1,000 m (3,300 ft)
- take-off distance: 210 m (690 ft)
- landing speed: 60 km/h (37 mph; 32 kn)
