= Shcherbakov Shche-2 =

Shche-2
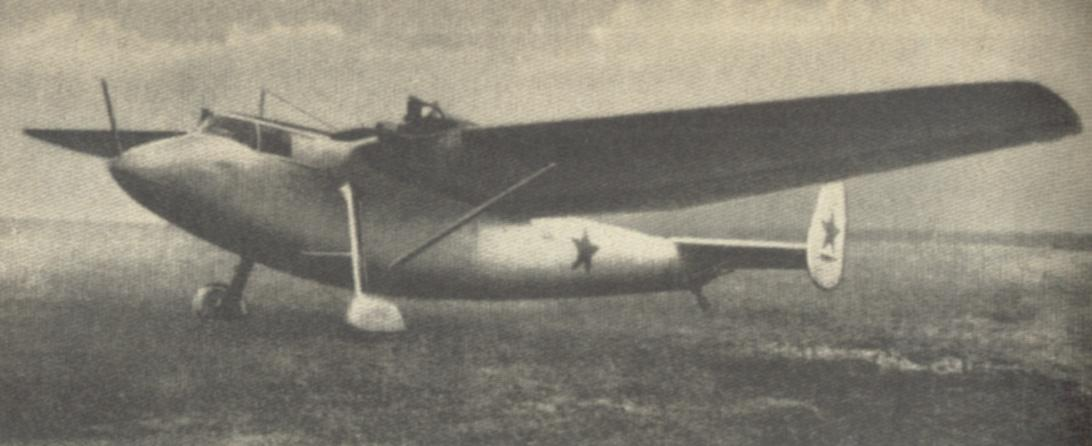

General information
- Type: Light transport
- Manufacturer: OKB-47
- Designer: Alexei Shcherbakov
- Primary users: Soviet Air Force Polish Air Force; Yugoslav Air Force; Aeroflot
- Number built: 550 (according to some sources, 567)

History
- Manufactured: 1943–1946
- First flight: 1942

The Shcherbakov Shche-2 (Russian: Ще-2, produced 1943–1946), also known as the TS-1 and nicknamed "Pike", was a twin-engined utility aircraft manufactured in the Soviet Union, designed by Alexei Shcherbakov for construction by OKB-47, to meet an urgent requirement for a light transport and liaison aircraft for operation by the Soviet Air Force during the Second World War. Proving to be successful, it remained in service for a number of years post-war in both civilian and military roles in the Soviet Union, and with the air forces of several allied nations. 550 built, in use until 1956 (USSR) and 1960 (foreign users).

== Design and development ==
The German invasion of the USSR revealed that there was an urgent requirement for a light transport and utility aircraft for use by the Soviet Air Force at the front. To meet this requirement, Aleksei Shcherbakov, who had previously worked at the Kalinin design bureau, and who had also heavily influenced the design of the Polikarpov I-153 fighter before conducting work on pressure cabins and gliders, was directed to design and develop an aircraft that received the designation "TS-1".

A cabin monoplane of semi-cantilever, high-wing configuration, the TS-1 was designed to minimise the use of strategic materials, utilising mostly wood in the construction of its remarkably streamlined airframe, and being powered by two readily available Shvetsov M-11 radial engines. Parts of the Lavochkin La-5 aircraft were also used, along with undercarriage parts from the Ilyushin Il-2. The aircraft was equipped with a fixed, conventional taildragger undercarriage, and a twin-fin tail from the Petlyakov Pe-2 was also utilised.

Test-flown in late 1942 and early 1943, the aircraft, by now having been redesignated Shche-2, proved to be capable of meeting the requirement, and production began in October 1943 at OKB-47, the bureaux being established at Chkalov (Orenburg) for use by Yakovlev, but being transferred to Shcherbakov's control for the manufacture of his type.

== Operational history ==
The Shche-2 was capable of transporting up to 16 troops, with an alternative air ambulance configuration for up to 11 wounded, or cargo up to 1.43 metres (4 ft 8 in) by 1.64 metres (5 ft 5 in) in size. Alternatively, the aircraft could be used as an aircrew and navigational trainer. It was extensively used in the transport and communications roles on the Eastern Front, providing essential, if unglamorous, service.

In 1945, the improved Shche-2TM variant entered flight test, powered by uprated M-11FM engines of 108 kilowatts (145 hp) each, and fitted with a modified wing. Despite the improvements in the design, the decision was made not to produce the aircraft due to a reduction in requirements for the type with the end of the war in May of that year. A proposed diesel-engined version, which began flight tests in July 1945, met the same fate.

Proving in service to be underpowered yet still easy to fly, and establishing a reputation for reliability and ease of maintenance, the Shche-2 was widely used by Soviet forces during the war. Seeing extensive service supplying guerrilla and partisan forces, the Shche-2 also proved to be useful for the delivery of paratroopers.

It is estimated that at least 550 Shche-2 aircraft were completed before the close of production in 1946, the OKB-47 factory being closed down at the conclusion of production. After the end of the war, the aircraft remained in service for several years, with the air forces of Yugoslavia and Poland making use of the type, in addition to the aircraft being extensively utilised in transport and air ambulance duties in civilian service within the Soviet Union. In addition, the Shche-2 was operated by Aeroflot on several local airline routes within the Soviet Union for several years after the end of the war, before its replacement by the Antonov An-2.

== Operators ==
=== Civil operators ===
Soviet Union

- Aeroflot

=== Military operators ===
Poland

- Polish Air Force – 5 aircraft, used 1945–1947.

Soviet Union

- Soviet Air Force

Yugoslavia

- Yugoslav Air Force – 5 aircraft, delivered in 1945, used through 1952.

== Specifications (Shche-2) ==

Data from

General characteristics

- Crew: two
- Capacity: up to 16 troops or 11 stretcher cases
- Length: 14.27 m (46 ft 10 in)
- Wingspan: 20.54 m (67 ft 5 in)
- Wing area: 64 m^{2} (690 sq ft)
- Empty weight: 2,235 kg (4,927 lb)
- Max takeoff weight: 3,700 kg (8,157 lb)
- Powerplant: 2 × Shvetsov M-11d radial engines, 86 kW (115 hp) each
- Propellers: 2-bladed

Performance

- Maximum speed: 155 km/h (96 mph, 84 kn)
- Range: 980 km (610 mi, 530 nmi)
- Service ceiling: 3,000 m (9,800 ft)
- Rate of climb: 1.20 m/s (236 ft/min)
- Wing loading: 53 kg/m^{2} (11 lb/sq ft)
- Power/mass: 0.05 kW/kg (0.03 hp/lb)

== See also ==
Aircraft of comparable role, configuration, and era

- Avro Anson
- Beechcraft Model 18
- de Havilland Dominie
- Yakovlev Yak-6

Related lists

- List of aircraft of World War II
- List of military aircraft of the Soviet Union and CIS
