= Lotnicze Warsztaty Doświadczalne =

Polish aerospace manufacturer

- Industry: Aerospace
- Founded: 1 April 1945
- Founder: Tadeusz Sołtyk; Aleksander Sułkowski
- Defunct: 1950
- Successor: WSK No. 4 Warszawa-Okęcie
- Headquarters: Łódź, Poland
- Parent: Ministry of Communication

Lotnicze Warsztaty Doświadczalne (LWD) was the Polish aerospace manufacturer and construction bureau, located in Łódź, active between 1945 and 1950. The name meant Aircraft Experimental Workshops. It was the first Polish post-war aerospace construction bureau.

== History ==
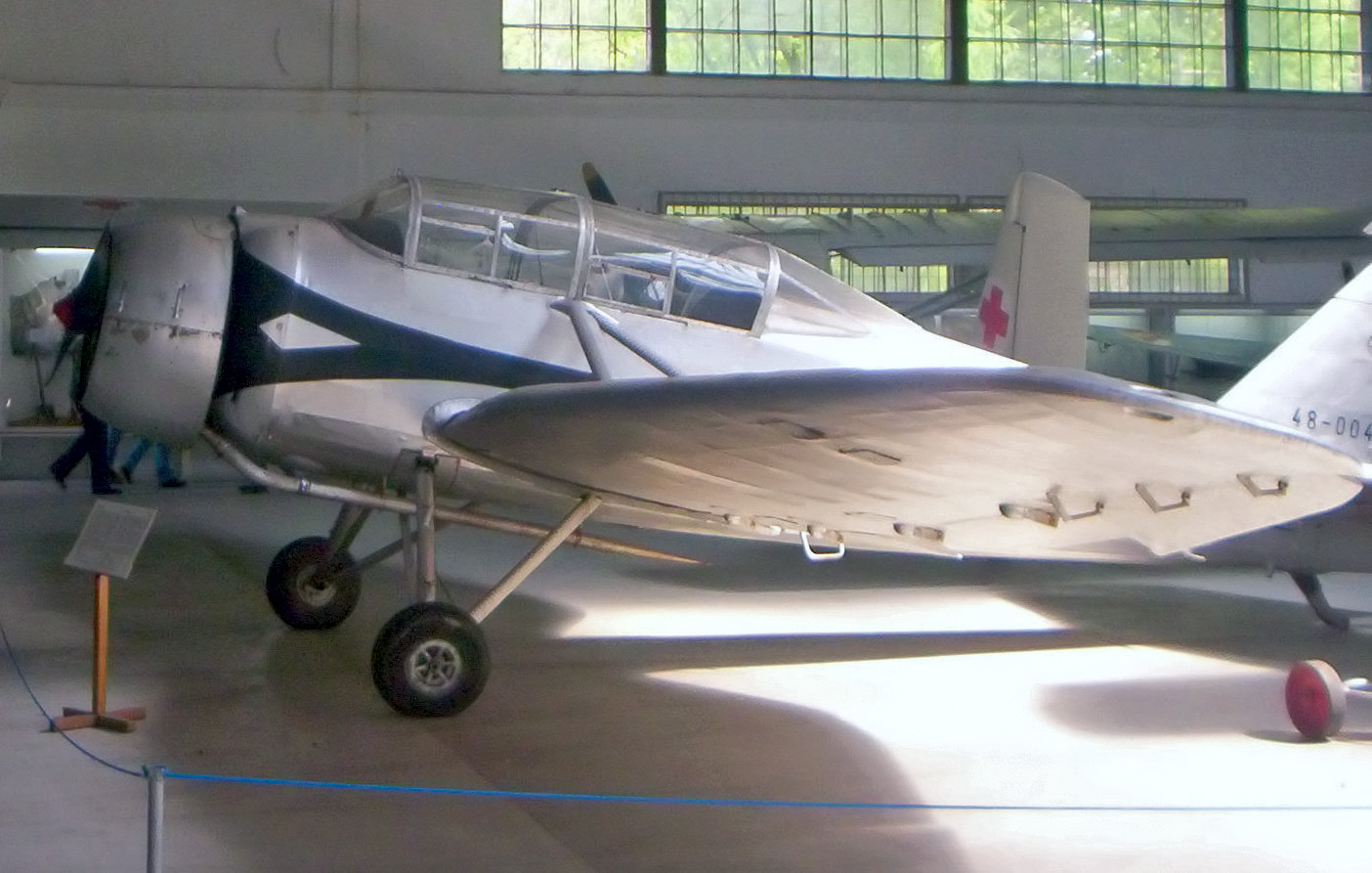
LWD Szpak-4T – the first Polish post-war series plane

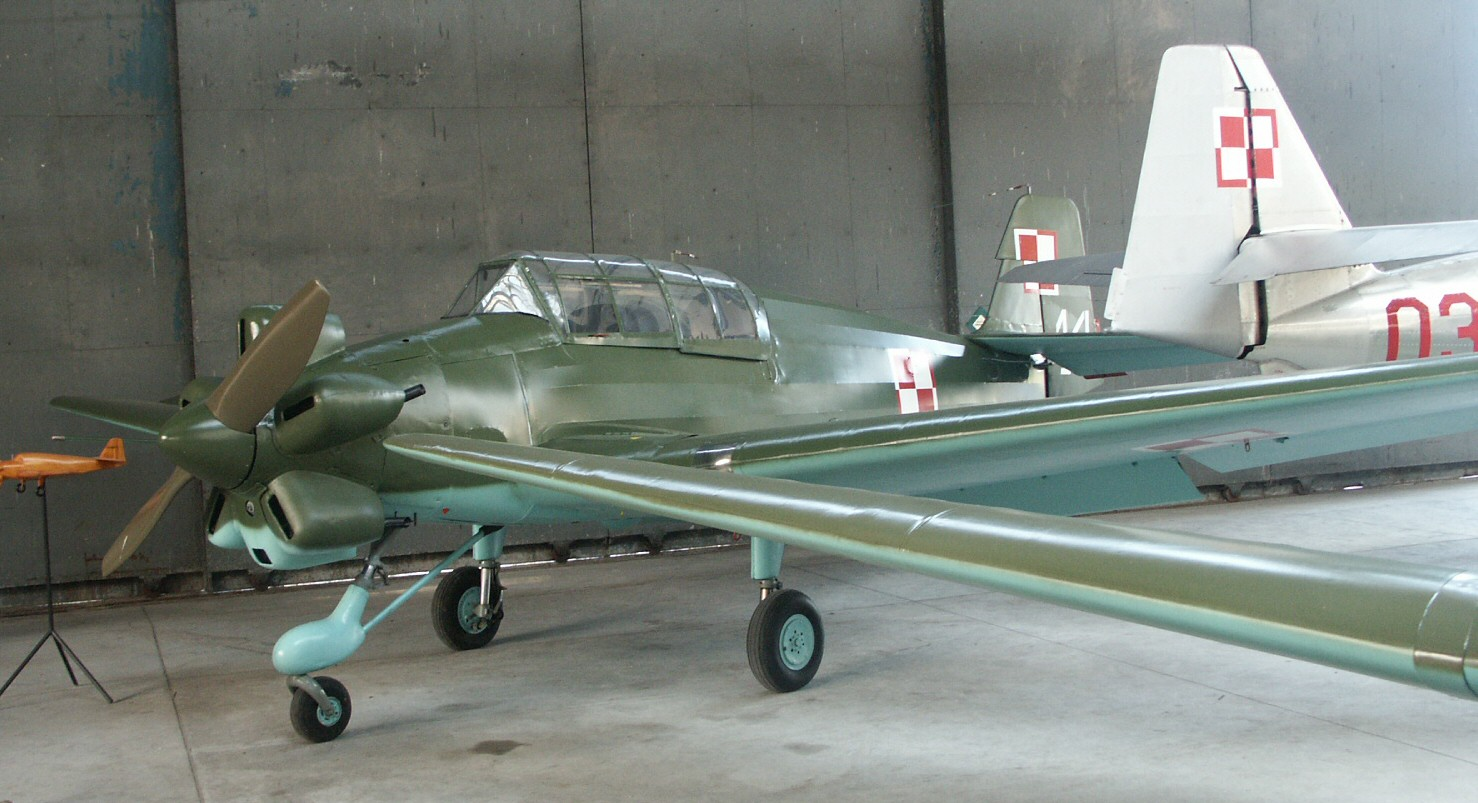
Junak-3 in the Polish Aviation Museum

World War II and German occupation destroyed the whole Polish aviation industry. After eastern Poland was liberated, in October 1944 a group of designers gathered in Lublin as a Design Bureau in the Ministry of Communication. It was directed by Aleksander Sułkowski, but Tadeusz Sołtyk became the main designer. In primitive conditions, the bureau started work on a utility aircraft, the Szpak-1. In early 1945 the construction bureau moved to liberated Łódź. On April 1, 1945, the bureau established the Aircraft Experimental Workshops (LWD), subordinated to the Ministry of Communication. (Note: The name of the organization in Polish was roughly equivalent to Doświadczalne Warsztaty Lotnicze – the pre-war manufacturer of RWD planes.)

The Szpak-1 was not built, but LWD designed and built its development variant, the LWD Szpak-2 utility plane. It first flew on October 28, 1945, as the first Polish post-war plane. Only single prototypes of the Szpak-2 and Szpak-3 were built, but in 1947, PZL-Mielec built 10 Szpak-4 - the first Polish post-war plane to go into production.

The next design (also in 1947) was the LWD Żak, a two-seater touring and trainer plane. A series of 10 Żak-3 was built in LWD in 1948, plus prototypes of the Żak-1, Żak-2, and Żak-4.

LWD's most successful design was a military and civilian trainer, the LWD Junak of 1948. Its improved variants, Junak-2 and Junak-3, were produced from 1951 in the WSK-4 Okęcie in Warsaw (a total of 252), although its further development was carried out outside of LWD. The LWD Zuch of 1948 was a civilian aerobatics and trainer variant of the Junak. It was a successful design, but only 7 were built in LWD because of lack of proper engines.

LWD also designed the two-engine light transport plane LWD Miś of 1949, but it was not successful and was not produced. The last LWD design was the LWD Żuraw, a two-seater military liaison and utility high-wing plane prototype completed in 1951. It was not produced either.

In 1950 LWD was converted from a construction bureau and experimental works to a production factory and renamed WSK-6 (Wytwórnia Sprzętu Komunikacyjnego 6 - Communication Equipment Factory 6). This put an end to its activity. Soon it was disbanded because of too small production capabilities. Chief designer Tadeusz Sołtyk organized a new construction bureau in the Aviation Institute in Warsaw.

== Aircraft ==
Model name	First flight	Number built	Type
LWD Szpak	1945	3 (Note: Although an LWD design, all but three aircraft were built by other manufacturers.)	Single engine monoplane utility airplane
LWD Żak	1947	13	Single engine monoplane touring airplane
LWD Junak	1948	1 (Note: Although an LWD design, all but one aircraft were built by other manufacturers.)	Single engine monoplane trainer
LWD Zuch	1948 or 1949	7	Single engine monoplane aerobatic airplane
LWD Miś	1949	1	Twin engine monoplane transport
LWD Żuraw	1951	1	Single engine monoplane liaison airplane
