= Shvetsov M-11 =

Soviet piston aircraft engine

M-11
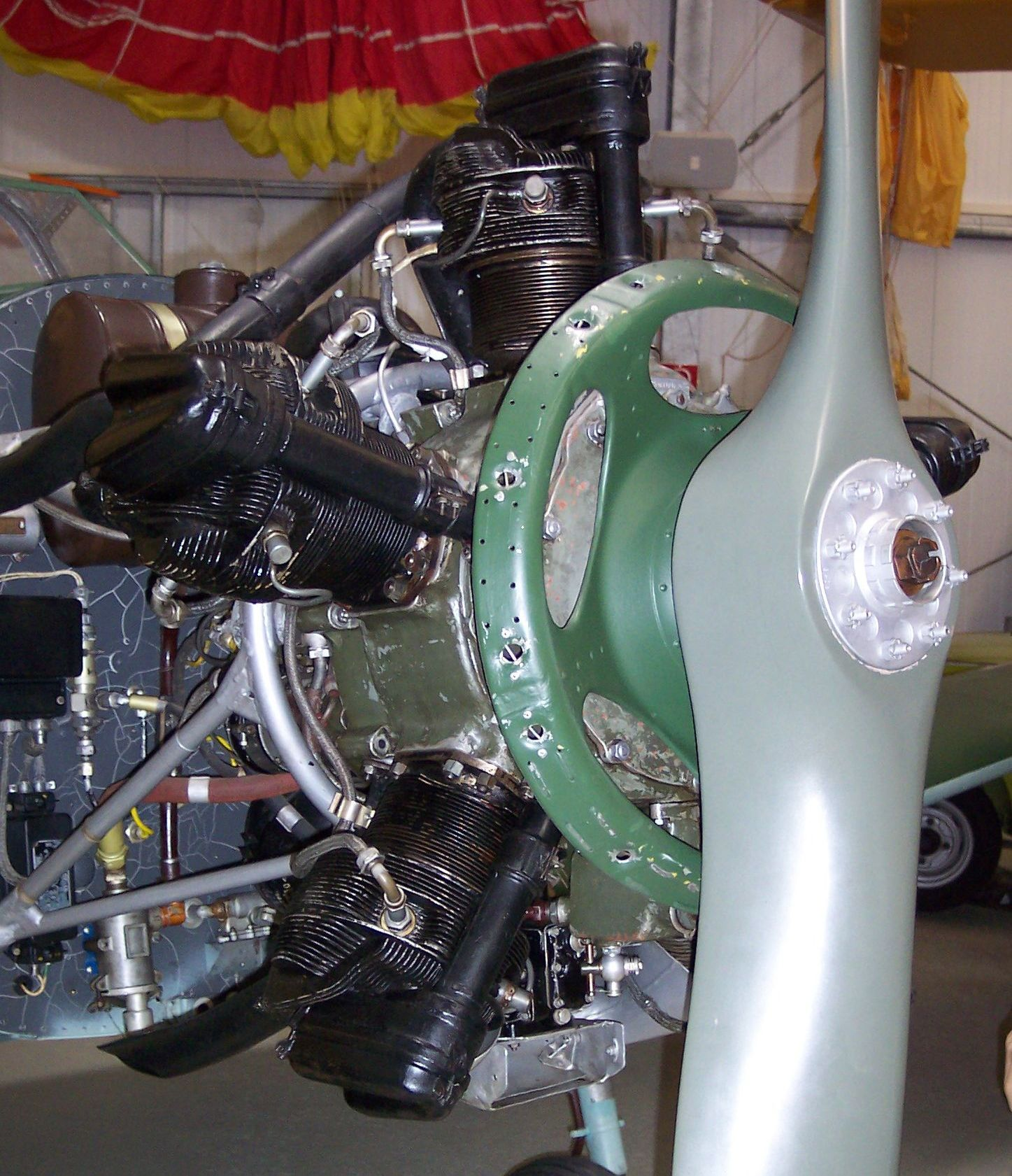
- Shvetsov M-11F
- Type: Radial engine
- Manufacturer: Shvetsov
- First run: 1923
- Number built: 100,000+

The Shvetsov M-11 is a five-cylinder air-cooled radial aircraft engine produced in the Soviet Union between 1923 and 1952.

== Design and development ==
The Shvetsov M-11 was designed under a 1923 competition in the Soviet Union for a new engine to power trainer aircraft. It is a single-row five-cylinder air-cooled radial piston engine with aluminum cylinder heads. Like the American Kinner B-5 5-cylinder radial of similar size, the M-11 had individual camshafts for each cylinder, operating the pushrods, rather than a single central cam ring. The initial versions of the M-11 suffered from a short service life of only 50 hours. The basic M-11 engine had a power output of 100 hp (73 kW), the newer M-11D variant was higher at 125 hp (92 kW). The ultimate version, M-11FR, introduced in 1946, increased power output to 160 hp at 1,900 rpm on takeoff and 140 hp at cruise and had provisions for a variable-pitch propeller, accessory drive (for vacuum pumps, compressors, generators, etc.) and featured a floatless carburetor.

== Variants ==
Data from:

M-100
Designation of prototype and initial designs.
M-11
Initial production version at 75 kW (100 hp), compression ratio 5:1
M-11a
75 kW (100 hp) / 82 kW (110 hp)
M-11/A
75 kW (100 hp) / 82 kW (110 hp)
M-11B
75 kW (100 hp) / 82 kW (110 hp)
M-11D
86 kW (115 hp) / 93 kW (125 hp)
M-11E
Compression ratio 6:1 - 110 kW (150 hp) / 120 kW (160 hp)
M-11F
108 kW (145 hp) / 123 kW (165 hp)
M-11FM
108 kW (145 hp)
M-11FR
Compression ratio 5.5:1 - 100 kW (140 hp) / 120 kW (160 hp)
M-11FR-1
Compression ratio 5.5:1 - 100 kW (140 hp) / 120 kW (160 hp)
M-11FN
150 kW (200 hp)
M-11G
75 kW (100 hp) / 82 kW (110 hp)
M-11I
Compression ratio 5.5:1 - 130 kW (170 hp) / 150 kW (200 hp)
M-11K
86 kW (115 hp) / 93 kW (125 hp)
M-11L
86 kW (115 hp) / 93 kW (125 hp)
M-11M
108 kW (145 hp)
M-11V
75 kW (100 hp) / 82 kW (110 hp)
M-11Ya:A projected development of the M-11 at GAZ-41. The prototype was run but results were unsatisfactory, re-designated M-12
M-11Ye
Developed by Okromechko 110 kW (150 hp)

=== Further developments ===
3M-11
An alternative designation for the M-50 three cylinder derivative of the M-11
M-12
A 190 hp (140 kW) development of the M-11 by M.A. Kossov, un-related to the NAMI-100, which had been earlier designated M-12.
M-12 (M-11Ya)
A projected development of the M-11 at GAZ-41. The prototype was run but results were unsatisfactory, re-designated from M-11Ya
M-13 (M-13K)
A 1944 development by M.A. Kossov to be assembled from various M-11 variants
M-13
In parallel with the M-13K, E.V. Urmin at GAZ-41 mated cylinders from the M-11D with new crankshaft and crankcase
M-13
A later M-13 was created by I.A. Muzhilov at OKB-41 in 1946. Despite passing state acceptance test in June 1948, this engine was not put into production.
M-48
A 7-cylinder further development at GAZ-29 150 kW (200 hp)
M-49
A 9-cylinder further development at GAZ-29 200 kW (270 hp) / 230 kW (310 hp)
M-50
A 3-cylinder further development at GAZ-29 45 kW (60 hp)
M-51
A 5-cylinder further development at GAZ-29 93 kW (125 hp) / 108 kW (145 hp)
MG-11
Development of the M-51 at the NIIGVF (Nauchno-Issledovatel'skiy Institut Grazdahnskovo Vozdooshnovo Flota - civil air fleet scientific test institute) by M.A. Kossov. 110 kW (150 hp) / 130 kW (180 hp)
MG-21
Development of the M-48 at the NIIGVF by M.A. Kossov. 160 kW (210 hp) / 190 kW (250 hp)
MG-31
Development of the M-49 at the NIIGVF by M.A. Kossov. 200 kW (270 hp) / 240 kW (320 hp)
MG-50
A projected 18 cylinder, two-row radial derived from M-11 components by M.A. Kossov. 600 kW (800 hp) / 630 kW (850 hp)

== Applications ==
The M-11 powered a number of Soviet, Bulgarian and Polish aircraft. The M-11 remained in production until 1952 with an estimated total of over 100,000 engines made. Several hundreds of M-11D and M-11FR-1 variants were manufactured under license in the Polish WSK-Kalisz works in Kalisz. It was also used for the up-engined GAZ-98K aerosani winter-used sled in a pusher configuration, and as the standard powerplant for the similar NKL-26 propeller-driven sledges during the World War II years.

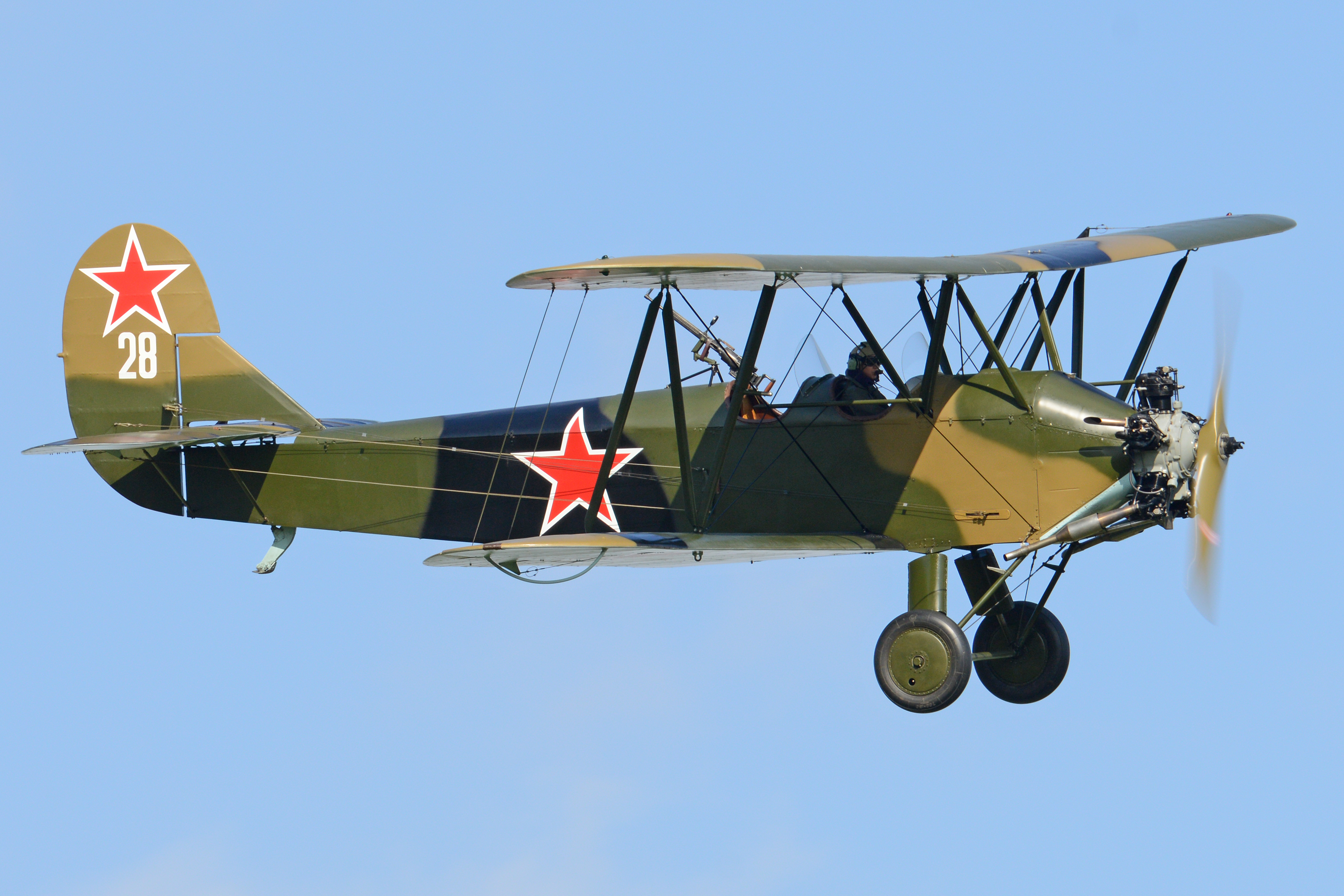
Polikarpov Po-2

- Anbo II (replica)
- Gribovsky G-15
- Gribovsky G-20
- Gribovsky G-21
- Gribovsky G-23
- Gribovsky G-27
- Kharkiv KhAI-3
- Laz-7M
- LWD Junak
- Mikoyan-Gurevich MiG-8 Utka
- Polikarpov Po-2
- PZL S-4 Kania
- Shavrov Sh-2
- Shcherbakov Shche-2
- Tsybin Ts-25M
- Yakovlev UT-1
- Yakovlev UT-2
- Yakovlev Yak-6
- Yakovlev Yak-12
- Yakovlev Yak-18

== Specifications (M-11A) ==
Data from Kotelnikov.

=== General characteristics ===
- Type: 5-cylinder air-cooled radial engine
- Bore: 125 mm (4.92 in)
- Stroke: 140 mm (5.51 in)
- Displacement: 8.6 L (525 in^{3})
- Dry weight: 165 kg (363 lb)

=== Components ===
- Cooling system: Air-cooled

=== Performance ===
- Power output:
- 82 kW (110 hp) at 1,650 rpm for takeoff
- 75 kW (100 hp) cruise
- Specific power: 9.5 kW/L (0.21 hp/in^{3})
- Compression ratio: 5:1
- Power-to-weight ratio: 0.5 kW/kg (0.3 hp/lb)

== See also ==
Comparable engines

- Armstrong Siddeley Genet
- Armstrong Siddeley Mongoose
- Kinner K-5
- Walter Vega
- Warner Scarab Junior
- Wright R-540

Related lists

- List of aircraft engines
