= Tadeusz Sołtyk =

Polish aircraft designer (1909–2004)

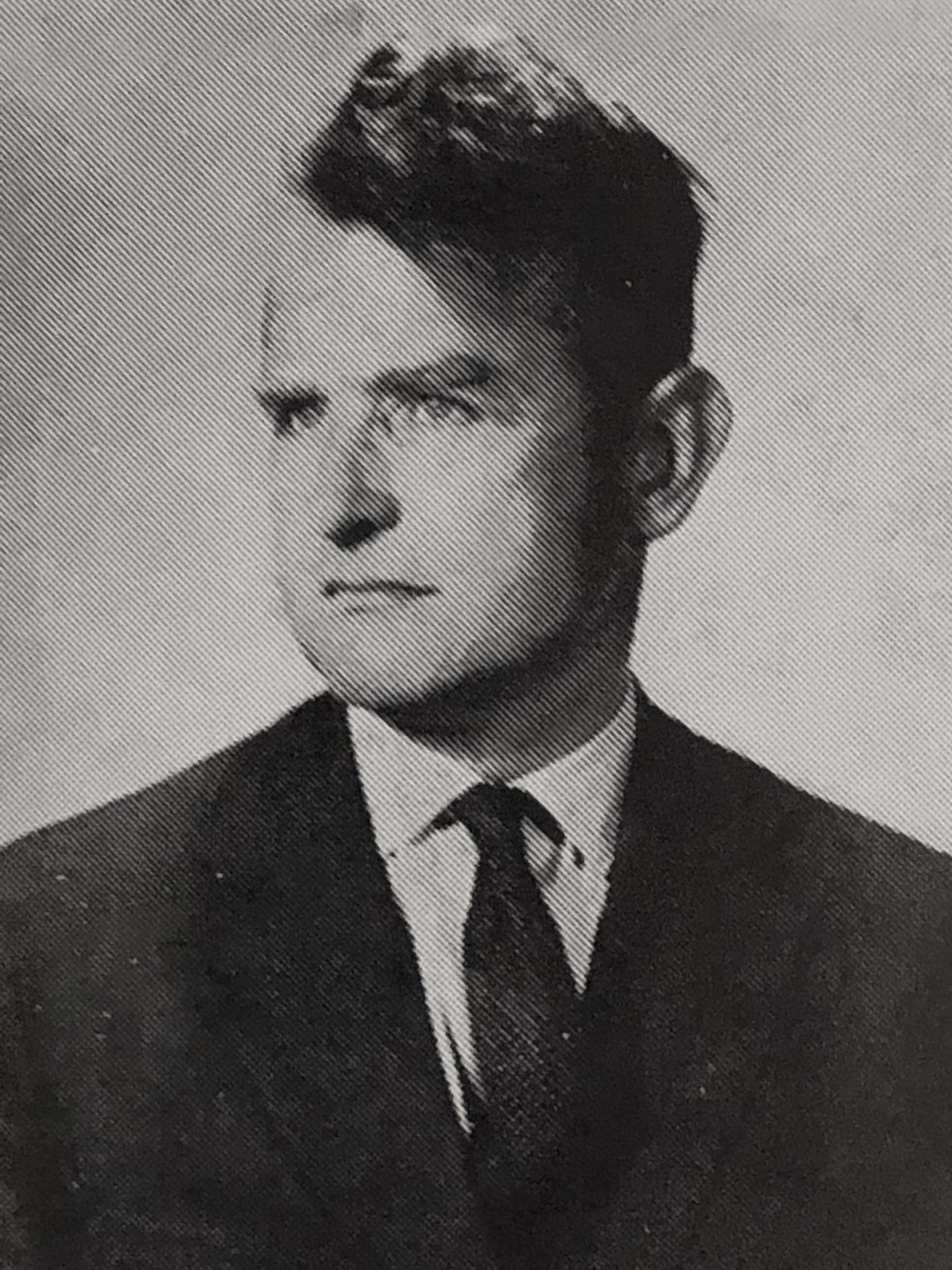

Tadeusz Sołtyk (born 30 August 1909 in Radom, died 14 July 2004 in Warsaw) was a Polish aircraft designer and aerospace engineer, most famous as the creator of the PZL TS-11 Iskra

After graduating from the Mechanical Department of the Warsaw University of Technology in 1934, he became a designer at the State Aviation Works (PZL). During his tenure at the company, he participated in the development of the PZL 23 Karaś light bomber and its potential successor, the PZL.46 Sum. In 1939 he became a deputy to PZL's Chief Designer, Stanisław Prauss.

During the 1939 September Campaign, he fought in the battle of Kock. He was captured there, then escaped and eluded the German occupants by hiding in the countryside.

After the Germans were pushed back from eastern Poland, Sołtyk organized, in 1944, the Experimental Aircraft Workshops (LWD) in Lublin. He also became the chief designer in the facility. In 1949 Sołtyk took up work at the Institute of Aviation in Warsaw. Since 1952 he managed the newly created design office at the Institute.

1955 saw the first test flights of the prototype for Sołtyk's training aircraft, the PZL TS-8 Bies. The production line for these machines was launched in 1957. The aeroplane won 3 world records in its class. That success allowed Sołtyk to work on the first Polish jet aircraft, the PZL TS-11 Iskra, test-flown in 1960. Iskra became the basic jet training plane in Polish military aviation, and was also exported to India. It remains in service with the Polish Air Force.

From 1967 Tadeusz Sołtyk started working at the Industrial Institute of Automation and Measurements, specializing in ship automation systems. He never returned to aircraft design. In 1992 he retired.

Tadeusz Sołtyk lectured at the Łódź, Gdańsk and Warsaw technical universities and at the Military Technical Academy.
