= List of microcars by country of origin: P =

== List ==
Country	Automobile Name	Manufacturer	Engine Make/Capacity	Seats	Year	Other information
Poland	Clic	Clic Car Corporation, Warsaw	505 cc	2	2003-	
Poland	Fafik	WFM, Warsaw	148 cc	2	1958	
Poland	Gad 500	WDPZM, Warsaw	496 cc	2	1953	
Poland	Meduza	Wytwórnia Sprzętu Komunikacyjnego, Mielec	300 cc	4	1957	Prototype using mechanics from the Mikrus MR-300
Poland	Mikrus MR-300	Wytwórnia Sprzętu Komunikacyjnego, Mielec	296 cc	4	1956-1960	
Poland	Pionier	Ministerstwo Transportu i Budownictwa,	496 cc	4	1953	
Poland	Smyk	Szczecińska Fabryka Motocykli, Szczecin	350 cc	2+2	1956-1957	Very limited production with perhaps 20 machines produced
Portugal	IPA 300	Industria Portuguesa de Automoveis, Porto De Mós			1956-1958	Engine British Anzani 300cc 15 bhp rear mounted, A small workshop that tried to launch its own new microcars inspired by 1950s German microcars but only 10 prototypes were made, of which only 4 cars still exist in a museum on display in Portugal.
Portugal	Lusito	AGB (António Gonçalves Baptista, Lisbon	360 cc	2	1954-1958	First attempt for a Portuguese microcar company, power was German DKW 360cc 6 bhp motorcycle engine, around 30 cars were made.
Portugal	Sado 550	Entreposto, Lisbon	Daihatsu 547 cc	2	1982-1986	Daihatsu 547cc 2 cylinder 29 bhp engine, its production reached 500 cars with 3 restyles.
