= PZL M-4 Tarpan =

M-4 Tarpan
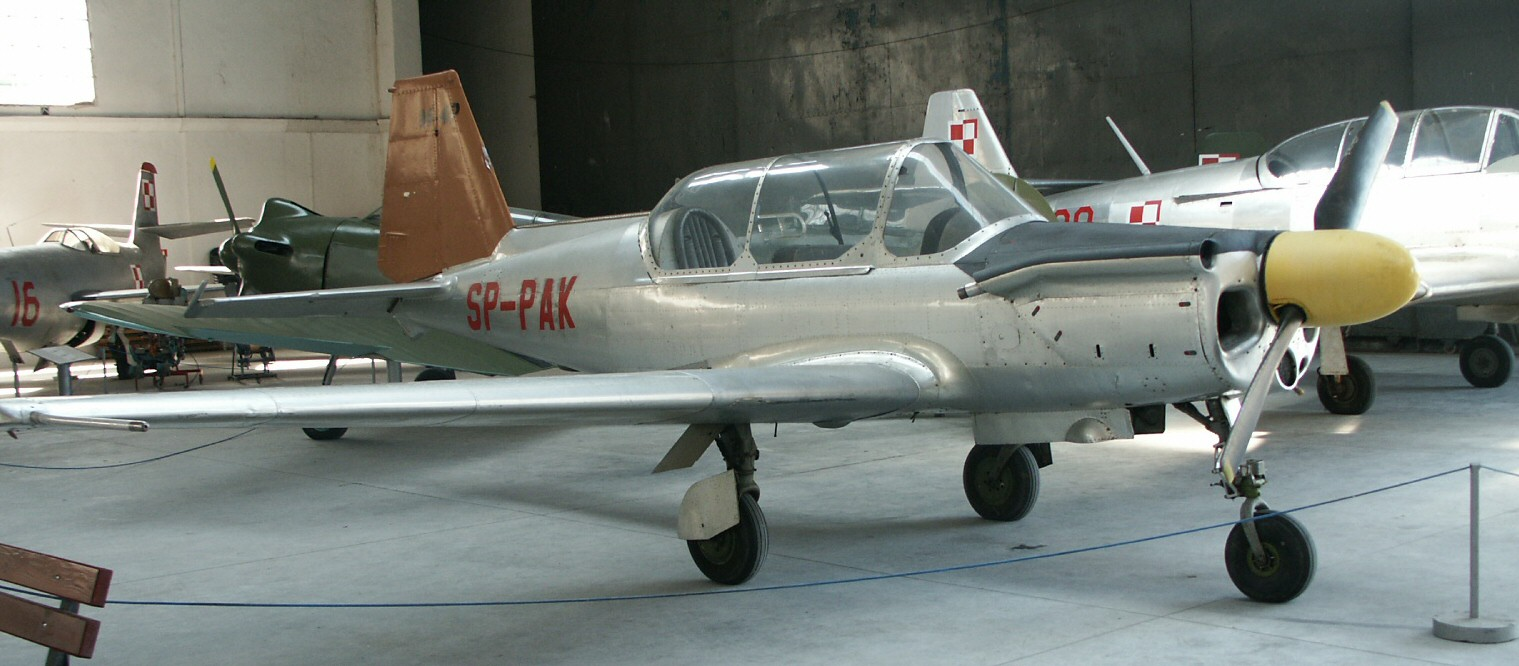
- M-4P in the Polish Aviation Museum

General information
- Type: Trainer aircraft
- Manufacturer: PZL-Mielec
- Status: Prototype
- Number built: 2 prototypes

History
- First flight: 7 September 1961

PZL M-4 Tarpan (also tarpan) was a Polish trainer and sports aircraft prototype of the 1960s, designed in WSK-Mielec.

== Design and development ==
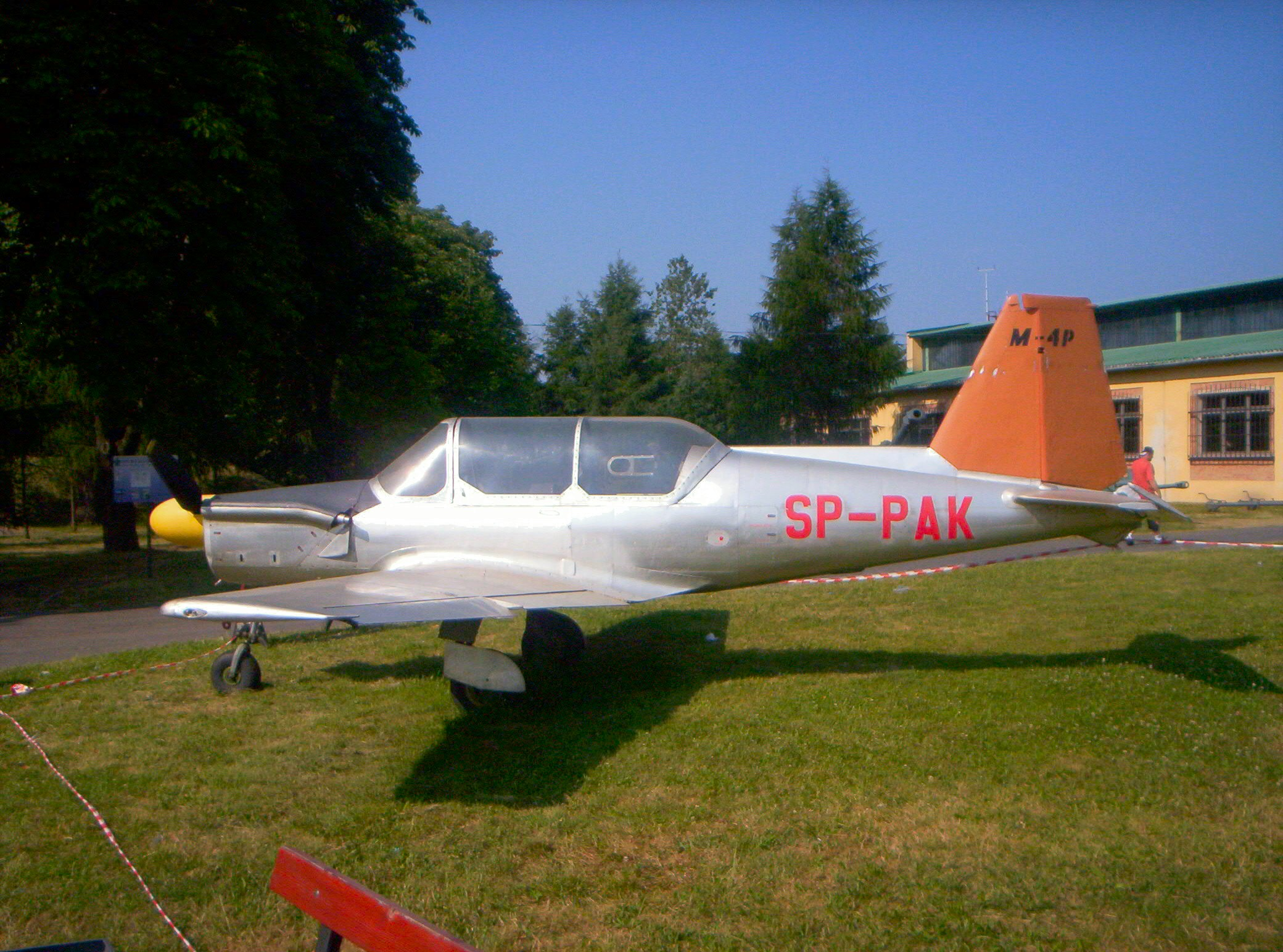
M-4 Tarpan

The M-4 was designed for a demand of the Polish Aero Club, for a trainer plane with a retractable tricycle landing gear. It was based on an earlier project PZL M-2. The basic variant was to be M-4P, for navigation training. The works started in 1958, and the first prototype was built in 1960. Due to a long engine development, it first flew on September 7, 1961 (registration SP-PAW). Trials showed, that the weight was much higher, than estimated (890 kg instead of 748 kg), which demanded changes in design. In July 1964 the second prototype was flown (registration SP-PAK).

The flight characteristics and stability of the M-4 were estimated as good, it was also fit to aerobatics and rally flying. The cab offered an excellent view for the crew and the plane was overall quite successful. However, because of too high price, the Polish Aero Club decided not to order the plane and the production has not started. A development of the flat engine PZL WN-6 was troublesome and was finally canceled at that time as well.

=== Description ===
Metal construction low-wing monoplane, conventional in layout, metal covered. Semi-monocoque fuselage. Trapezoid two-spar wings. Crew of two, sitting in tandem, under a common canopy, with double controls (student in front, instructor in the rear). Retractable tricycle landing gear. Two-blade wooden propeller of variable pitch (diameter 2 m). Fuel tanks in wings (140 L).

== Operational history ==
In 1965 both prototypes were converted to single seater aerobatics variant (in some sources known as the M-4A) by removing front cab equipment. It was planned to use them in World Aerobatics Championship in 1966 in Moscow, but they have not finished full homologation trials and the idea was abandoned. They were not used in this role much.

== Operators ==
Poland

- Aeroklub Polski operated second prototype in Mielec.

== Survivors ==
The second M-4 prototype (SP-PAK) is preserved in the Polish Aviation Museum in Kraków, from 1971.

== Specifications ==
Data from Jane's All the World's Aircraft 1962–63

General characteristics

- Crew: 2
- Length: 7.33 m (24 ft 1 in)
- Wingspan: 8.85 m (29 ft 0 in)
- Height: 2.73 m (8 ft 11 in)
- Wing area: 11.79 m^{2} (126.9 sq ft)
- Aspect ratio: 6.56:1
- Airfoil: NACA 23015 at root, NACA 23012 at tip
- Empty weight: 758 kg (1,671 lb)
- Max takeoff weight: 1,050 kg (2,315 lb)
- Powerplant: 1 × Narkiewicz WN-6 air-cooled 6-cylinder horizontally-opposed engine, 134–145 kW (180–195 hp)

Performance

- Maximum speed: 307 km/h (191 mph, 166 kn)
- Minimum control speed: 96 km/h (60 mph, 52 kn) (with flaps)
- Range: 750 km (470 mi, 400 nmi)
- Service ceiling: 6,900 m (1,260 ft)

== See also ==
Aircraft of comparable role, configuration, and era

- Zlin 526
