= PZL S-4 Kania 2 =

PZL S-4 Kania
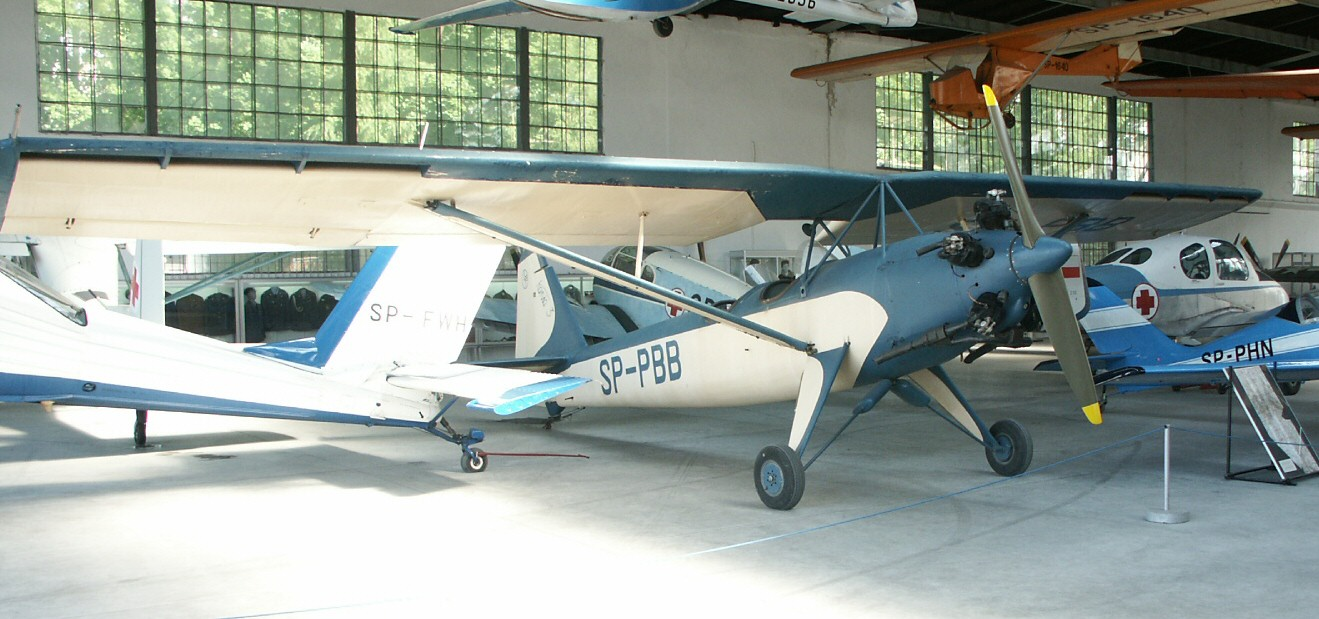
- S-4 Kania-3 at the Polish Aviation Museum

General information
- Type: Trainer and glider towing aircraft
- Manufacturer: WSK-Mielec
- Primary user: Aeroklub Polski
- Number built: 3 + 1

History
- Manufactured: 1951–1964
- First flight: 17 May 1951 (S-3)

The PZL S-4 Kania 2 was a Polish trainer and glider towing aircraft of the 1950s, not built in series. The first prototype was designated S-3 Kania. There is also a helicopter named PZL Kania.

== Design and development ==
The aircraft was designed by Eugeniusz Stankiewicz in 1950, its primary purpose was towing gliders. The first prototype was named S-3 Kania (kite (bird), S for Stankiewicz, it probably had no PZL prefix). It was built in the Szybowcowy Zakład Doświadczalny (SZD, Glider Experimental Works) in Bielsko-Biała and first flew on 17 May 1951. It appeared quite successful, and was cheaper in production and service, than the CSS-13 (licensed Polikarpov Po-2), but was not produced, because the Aviation Institute (Instytut Lotnictwa, IL) found some lacks in calculations and too weak landing gear. The work ceased, while the prototype was abandoned to ruin.

In 1956, the design was taken over by WSK-Mielec factory (partly due to an interest of the press, combined with shortages of aircraft in aero clubs). It was developed and improved by Stankiewicz's team and on 2 September 1957, a new prototype, the PZL S-4 Kania-2, was flown. On 19 September 1958, another further improved prototype, the PZL S-4 Kania-3, flew, with enlarged tailfin. This underwent state trials in 1960 with good results. It offered good handling and was useful to training, glider towing, and basic aerobatics. It could tow 2 or 3 gliders at a time. The S-4 did not enter production, though, because due to a long development, the design had become dated. At that time, it was preferred to use metal aircraft in aeroclubs, and the PZL-104 Wilga was in development. The other thing was, production of the obsolete M-11 engine had ceased in Poland.

Work on the third S-4 prototype was suspended, but completed by the Aircraft Repair Works in Krosno in 1964.

=== Description ===
The S-4 was a high-wing monoplane (parasol wing) of wooden construction, conventional in layout, with a semi-monocoque fuselage and fixed tail-wheel landing gear. The crew of two, sat in tandem open cockpits with windshields.

== Operational history ==
The first S-4 Kania-2 prototype (registration SP-PAA) was shown on World Gliding Championship at Leszno in 1958, towing several gliders. Along with the second S-4 prototype (registration SP-PBB), the first S-4 was used by the aero club in Mielec, whilst the third S-4 prototype was used at Krosno (registration SP-PBE).

== Operators ==
Poland

- Aeroklub Polski operated two S-4 prototypes in Mielec and the third S-4 prototype in Krosno.
- Polish Air Force one aircraft only.

== Surviving aircraft ==
The second prototype S-4 Kania-3 (SP-PBB) is preserved in the Polish Aviation Museum in Kraków, from 1971.

== Specifications (S-4) ==
Data from Jane's all the World's Aircraft 1959-60, PZL S-X konstrukcje E. Stankiewicza oznaczone symbolem "S" : PZL S-4 Kania

General characteristics

- Crew: 2
- Length: 8.15 m (26 ft 9 in)
- Wingspan: 12.12 m (39 ft 9 in)
- Height: 2.35 m (7 ft 9 in)
- Wing area: 19.7 m^{2} (212 sq ft)
- Aspect ratio: 7.34
- Airfoil: NACA 23012
- Empty weight: 585 kg (1,290 lb)
- Gross weight: 903 kg (1,991 lb)
- Fuel capacity: 168 L (44 US gal; 37 imp gal)
- Powerplant: 1 × Shvetsov M-11D 5-cylinder air-cooled radial piston engine, 93 kW (125 hp)
- Propellers: 2-bladed fixed-pitch propeller, 2.1 m (6 ft 11 in) diameter

Performance

- Maximum speed: 180 km/h (110 mph, 97 kn) at sea level
- Cruise speed: 160 km/h (99 mph, 86 kn)
- Stall speed: 55 km/h (34 mph, 30 kn)
- Range: 800 km (500 mi, 430 nmi)
- Service ceiling: 5,500 m (18,000 ft)
- Rate of climb: 4.5 m/s (890 ft/min)

== See also ==
- PZL Kania

Related development

- PZL S-1
