= PZL M-2 =

M-2
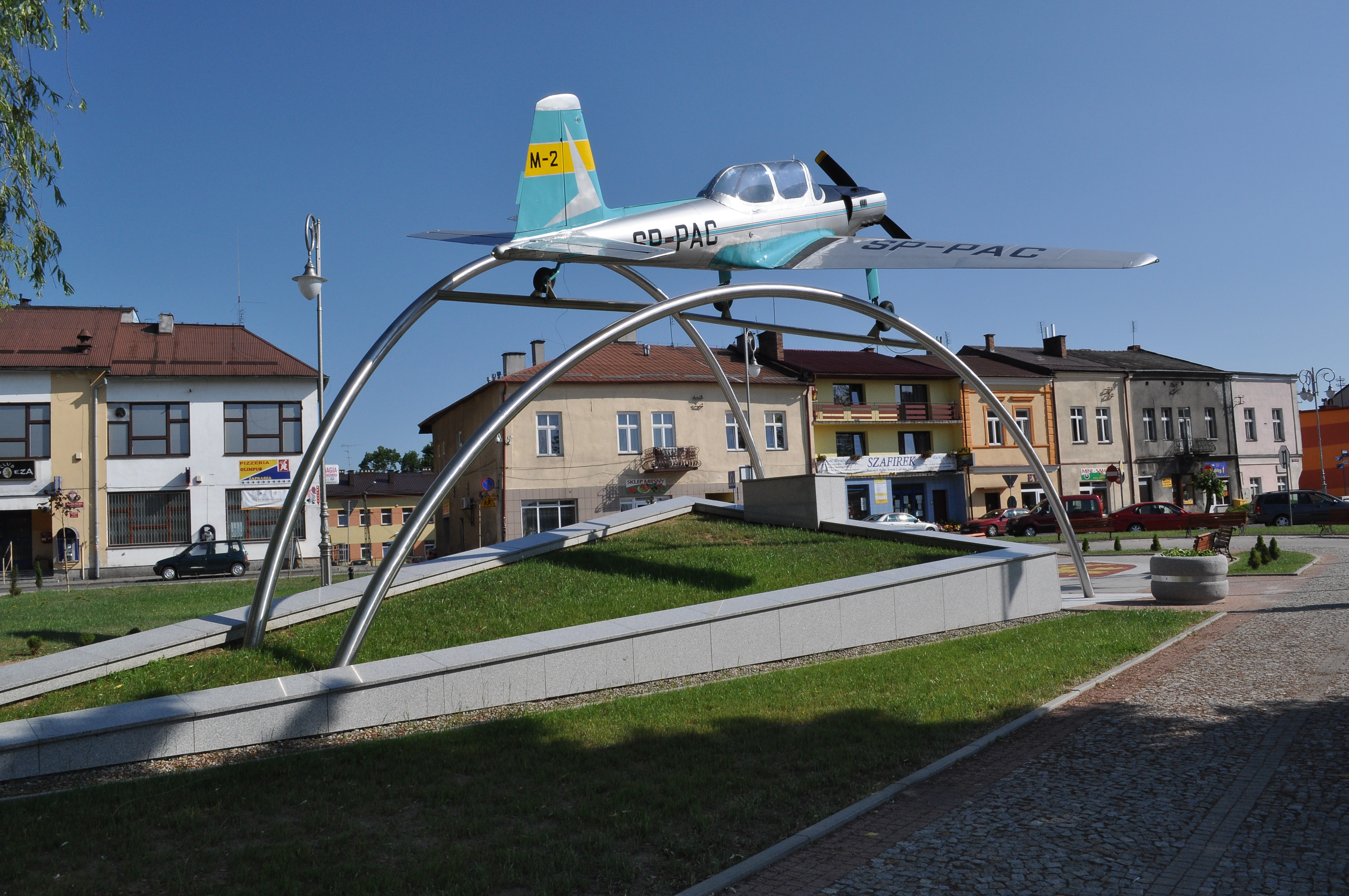
- The second prototype preserved at Radomyśl Wielki

General information
- Type: Trainer aircraft
- Manufacturer: WSK-Mielec
- Status: Prototype
- Number built: 2 prototypes

History
- First flight: 26 June 1958

PZL M-2 was a Polish trainer aircraft prototype of 1958, a low-wing monoplane with fixed gear. Designed at WSK-Mielec, it did not enter production.

== Design and development ==
The M-2 was designed as a trainer aircraft for the Polish Aero Club by the newly created construction bureau of the WSK Mielec factory. The aircraft's main designer was Stanisław Jachyra. The first prototype was flown on 26 June 1958 (registration SP-PAC) with the second prototype flying on 13 September that year (registration SP-PBA).

The aircraft was of relatively modern, all-metal construction. Its major drawback was its engine, an imported Praga Doris flat-six piston engine, which caused vibration and was not suitable for aerobatics. This limited the potential use of the aircraft. It was proposed to replace the engine with the Polish designed and built Narkiewicz WN-6 flat-six engine, but this was still under development and was never perfected. Due to the problems with the powerplant, the development of the aircraft was delayed, and in the meantime, the Polish Aero Club changed its preferences to aircraft with a tricycle landing gear and withdrew its interest in the M-2. As a result, the M-2 did not enter production and further work was abandoned. A development of the M-2 was the PZL M-4 Tarpan, with a retractable tricycle landing gear.

=== Description ===
Metal construction low-wing monoplane, conventional in layout, metal covered. Semi-monocoque fuselage. Trapezoid wings, two-spar, fitted with flaps. Crew of two, sitting in tandem, under a common canopy, with double controls (student in front, instructor in the rear). Fixed conventional landing gear. Flat engine in front, two-blade tractor propeller, 2.3 m diameter. Fuel tanks in wings - 120 L.

== Survivors ==
The first prototype (SP-PAC) is stored in the Polish Aviation Museum in Kraków (disassembled), the second prototype (SP-PBA) is preserved as a monument in Radomyśl Wielki near Mielec.

== Specifications ==
Data from Jane's All The World's Aircraft 1961–62

General characteristics

- Crew: 2
- Length: 7.62 m (25 ft 0 in)
- Wingspan: 9.50 m (31 ft 2 in)
- Height: 3.02 m (9 ft 11 in)
- Wing area: 13.6 m^{2} (146 sq ft)
- Aspect ratio: 6.62:1
- Empty weight: 787 kg (1,735 lb)
- Gross weight: 1,067 kg (2,352 lb)
- Powerplant: 1 × Praga Doris M208B 6-cylinder air-cooled horizontally-opposed piston engine, 160 kW (220 hp)
- Propellers: 2-bladed adjustable-pitch wooden propeller, 2.3 m (7 ft 7 in) diameter

Performance

- Maximum speed: 282 km/h (175 mph, 152 kn)
- Cruise speed: 240 km/h (150 mph, 130 kn)
- Never exceed speed: 436 km/h (271 mph, 235 kn)
- Range: 685 km (426 mi, 370 nmi)
- Service ceiling: 5,600 m (18,400 ft)
- Rate of climb: 7.0 m/s (1,380 ft/min)

== See also ==
Related development

- PZL M-4 Tarpan

Aircraft of comparable role, configuration, and era

- Zlin 226
