= PZL-Mielec Lim-6 =

Polish-built version of the MiG-17

Lim-6
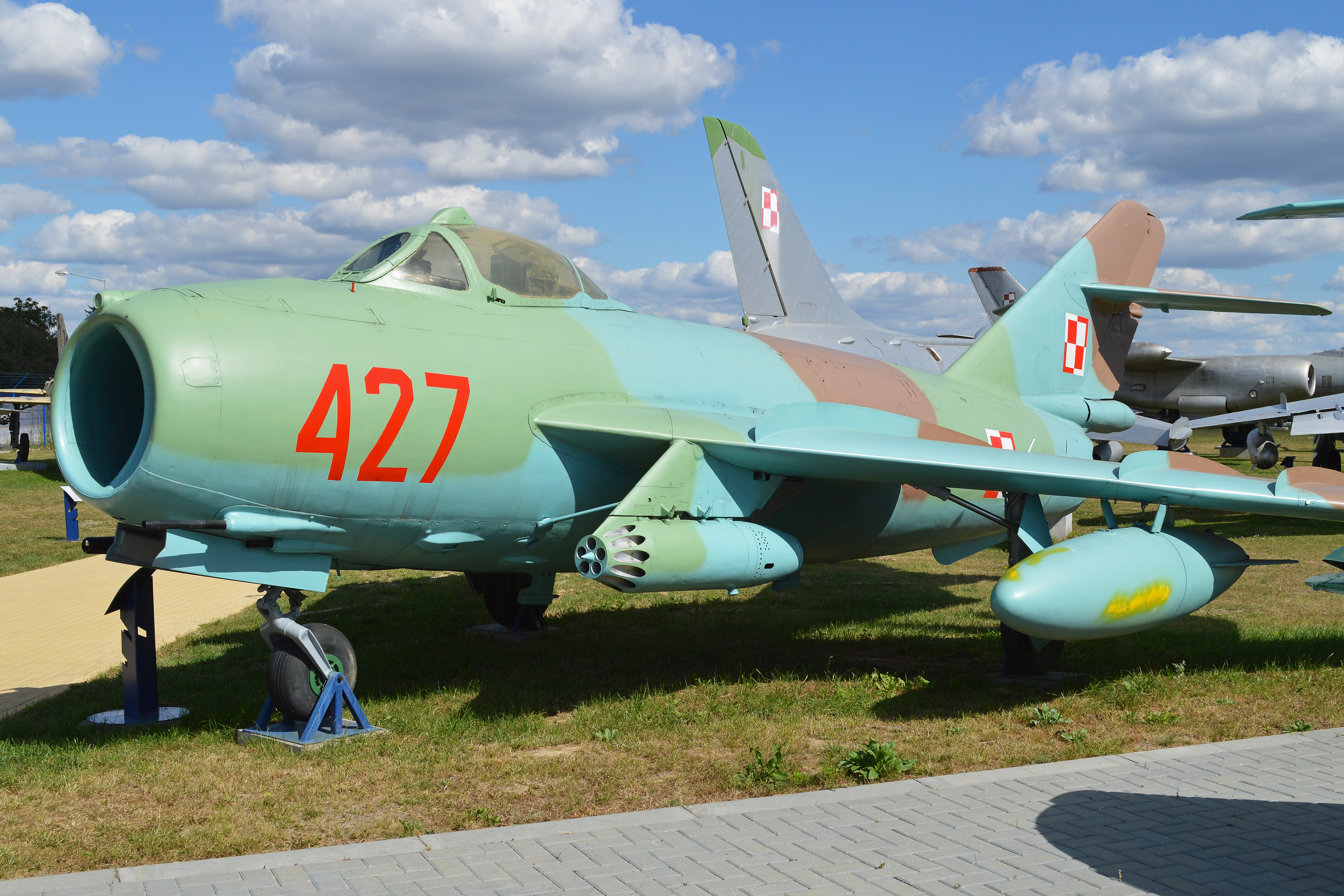
- Lim-6bis with visible UB-16-57D (Mars-2) rocket launchers

General information
- Type: Attack aircraft
- National origin: Soviet Union; Poland
- Manufacturer: Mikoyan-Gurevich; PZL-Mielec
- Status: Retired
- Primary users: Polish Air Force Egyptian Air Force; East German Air Force; Indonesian Air Force

History
- Introduction date: 1956
- Developed from: Mikoyan-Gurevich MiG-17

The Lim-6 (NATO reporting name Fresco) was a Polish attack aircraft used between 1961 and 1992 by the Polish Air Force. It was a variant of the Mikoyan-Gurevich MiG-17, which was produced in Poland as the Lim-5.

== Development ==
In 1955 Poland bought a licence for the manufacturing of the Soviet MiG-17, the basic jet fighter of Warsaw Pact countries. The licensed aircraft was given the designation Lim-5 (an abbreviation of: licencyjny myśliwiec – "licensed fighter"). The first Lim-5 was built in WSK-Mielec on November 28, 1956, replacing the production of the Lim-2 (MiG-15bis). By production's end in 1960, 477 Lim-5s were built, becoming Poland's primary fighter. (This number includes the Lim-5R reconnaissance variant, equipped with an AFA-39 camera.) From 1959 Poland began to produce the licensed MiG-17PF interceptor, equipped with the Izumrud-5 (RP-5) radar, as the Lim-5P. By 1960, 129 were built.

In the late 1950s work commenced in Poland on developing a light attack aircraft based on the Lim-5. The basic MiG-17 and Lim-5 could only carry two 250 kg bombs, which replaced their underwing fuel tanks. After building prototypes, designated 'CM', in 1960 Poles began production of an attack aircraft, Lim-5M. It introduced several modifications, mostly to allow use from rough airfields. It had double undercarriage wheels, a braking parachute, and attachments for RATO. The wing sections close to the fuselage were noticeably thicker, due to them containing additional fuel tanks. Instead of two bombs, it could carry two launchers for eight S-5 rockets (57 mm). By 1961, 60 Lim-5M's were built and from November 1961 operated by the Polish Air Force. They were not successful; thicker wings decreased performance, made handling tricky, and increased drag so much that the range was improved much less than planned.

The Lim-5M was regarded only as an interim variant, and work on a more advanced design continued, testing many different ideas. In 1961, 40 Lim-6 attack aircraft were built. They introduced new blown flaps, but tests showed problems with the modified Lis-6 jet engine and the aircraft were not delivered to the Air Force. As a result, it was decided to redesign the thick wing sections with fuel tanks, blown flaps, double wheels and RATO and return to only slightly modified Lim-5 construction, with increased weapon-carrying capability instead.

In 1963 the Poles started production of the final variant of the attack plane, the Lim-6bis. It had standard wings and single wheels, like the Lim-5 fighter. One important change was the addition of two underwing weapon pylons close to the fuselage. Another was the fitting of a braking parachute container below the rudder. These aircraft entered the service in the Polish Air Force in 1963, but were not officially accepted until 14 September 1964.

By 1964, 70 Lim-6bis were built and a number of Lim-5Ms and Lim-6s were rebuilt as Lim-6bis. A number were also converted to a reconnaissance variant Lim-6R (or Lim-6bisR) with an AFA-39 camera under a fuselage.

As Lim-5P fighters became obsolete, from 1971 they were also converted to the Lim-6bis standard, under the designation of Lim-6M. Their radars were removed, but the radar covers in the central air intake remained. They were fitted with additional underwing pylons, but not with a braking parachute. Some aircraft were modified to a reconnaissance variant designated the Lim-6MR.

== Design ==
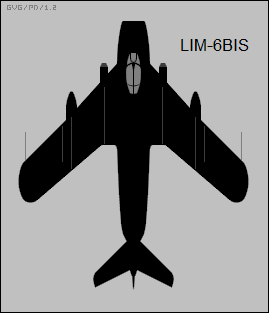
Lim-6bis silhouette

The Lim-6bis was armed with two NR-23 23 mm cannons (80 rounds) and one N-37D 37 mm cannon (40 rounds), like the MiG-17 (the Lim-6M was probably armed with three NR-23 23 mm cannons, like MiG-17PF). It had four underwing pylons. Typical armament consisted of two Polish-made Mars-2 launchers for 16 unguided 57 mm rockets S-5 each, or 100 kg bombs. It could also carry 250 kg bombs or launchers on standard outer underwing pods, but usually they were used for 400l fuel tanks.

== Operational history ==
Lim-6bis, 6R, 6M and 6MR were used by the Polish Air Force as its most numerous attack aircraft until the 1980s. The last were finally withdrawn in 1992.

Some were exported to the East Germany (German Democratic Republic), Egypt and Indonesia. Some GDR machines found themselves in Guinea-Bissau in the 1980s.

== Variants ==
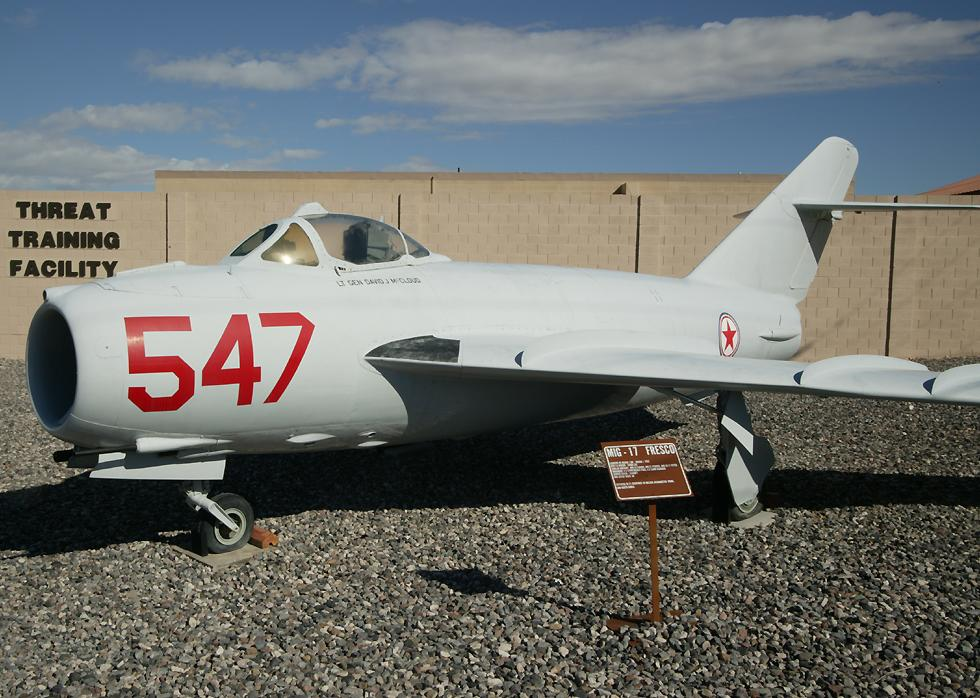
A former Indonesia Lim-5 on display in the United States in North Korean markings

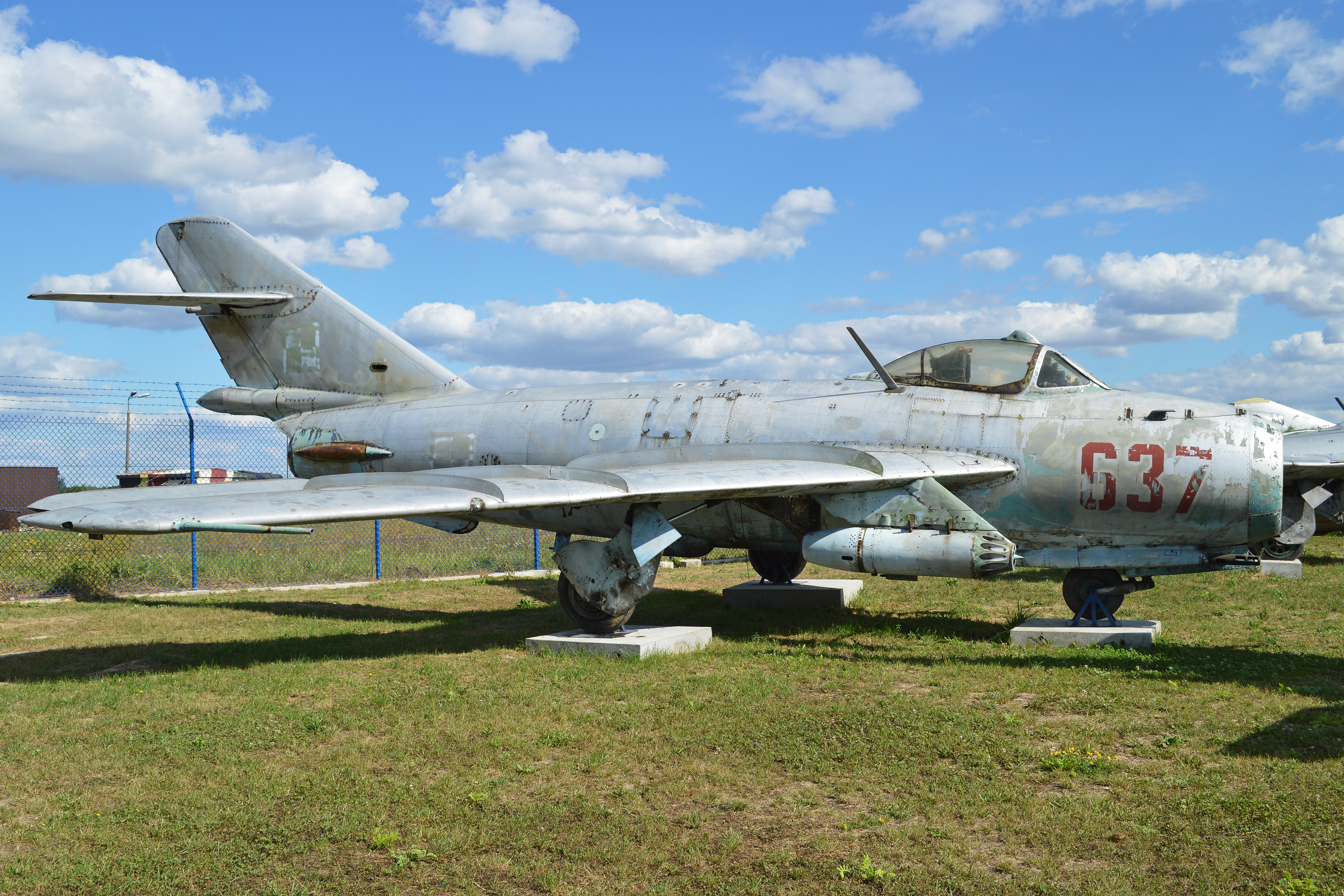
Lim-6R

Lim-5
Day-fighter (licensed MiG-17F) (serial numbers: 1C 00-01 to 1C 19-14).
Lim-5R
Reconnaissance version of Lim-5.
Lim-5P
All-weather interceptor (licensed MiG-17PF) (serial numbers: 1D 00-01(?) to 1D 06-41).
Lim-5M
Attack aircraft (serial numbers: 1F 01-01 to 1F 03-30).
Lim-6
Experimental attack aircraft (serial numbers: 1J 04-01 to 1J 04-40).
Lim-6bis
Basic attack aircraft (numbers 1J 05-01 to 1J 06-40).
Lim-6R (Lim-6bisR)
Reconnaissance variant of Lim-6bis.
Lim-6M
Interceptor aircraft, conversion of Lim-5P.
Lim-6MR
Reconnaissance aircraft, conversion of Lim-5P.

== Operators ==
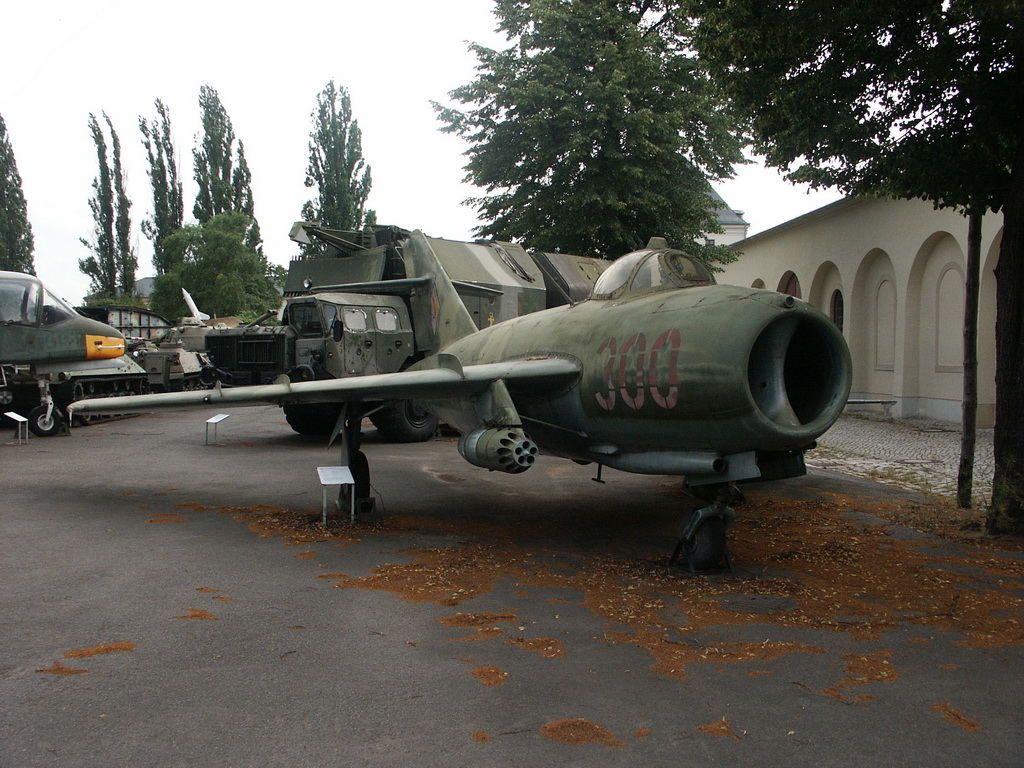
Lim-5 in East German markings

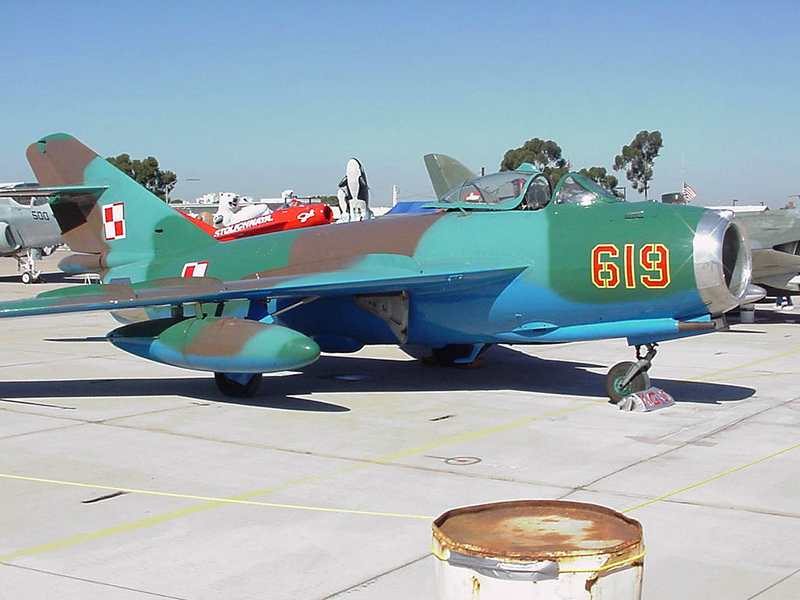
A private PZL-Mielec Lim-6R (Lim-6bisR), aircraft Registration N619M (NX619M/619 red) construction Number 1J0619 at Miramar Airshow 2000.

=== Former operators ===
Bulgaria

- Bulgarian Air Force: 29 Lim-5, 2 Lim-5P

Egypt

- Egyptian Air Force

East Germany

- East German Air Force: 120 Lim-5, 40 Lim-5P

Germany

- All scrapped or sold to Guinea Bissau.

Guinea-Bissau

- Guinea-Bissau Air Force: 8 Lim-5, ex-East German. Non-operational by 2011

Indonesia

- Indonesian Air Force: 20 Lim-5, 5 Lim-5P

Israel

- Israeli Air Force - One captured for tests.

Poland

- Polish Air Force: 197 Lim-6M/bis in 1975
- Polish Navy

Syria

- Syrian Air Force

United States

Received in 1968 from Israel for tests in USAF and US Navy. Late in 1980s returned.

== Specifications (Lim-6bis) ==
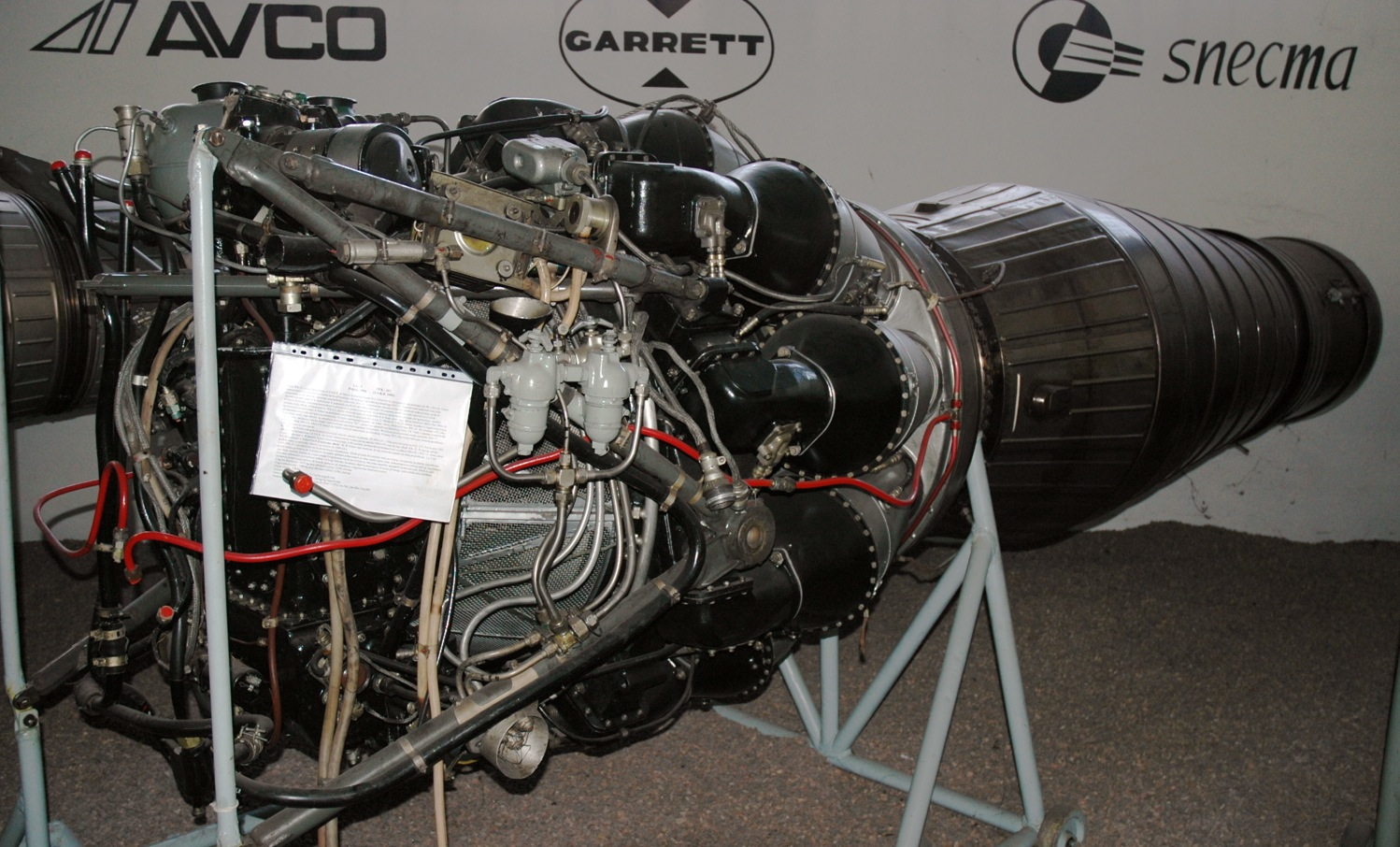
Lis-5 turbojet engine

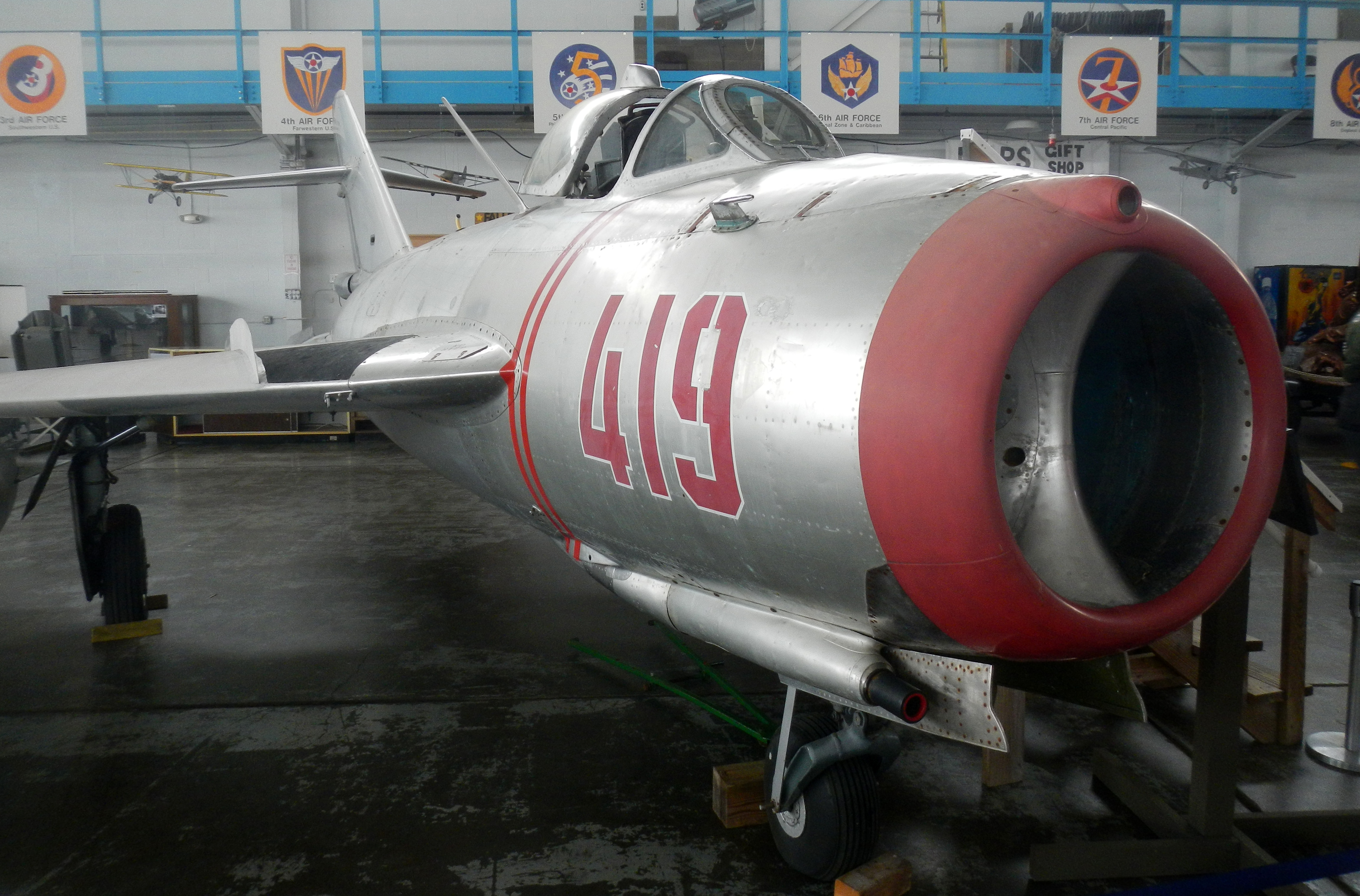
Front view of LIM 6bis Fresco in Polish service; MAPS air museum, North Canton, Ohio.

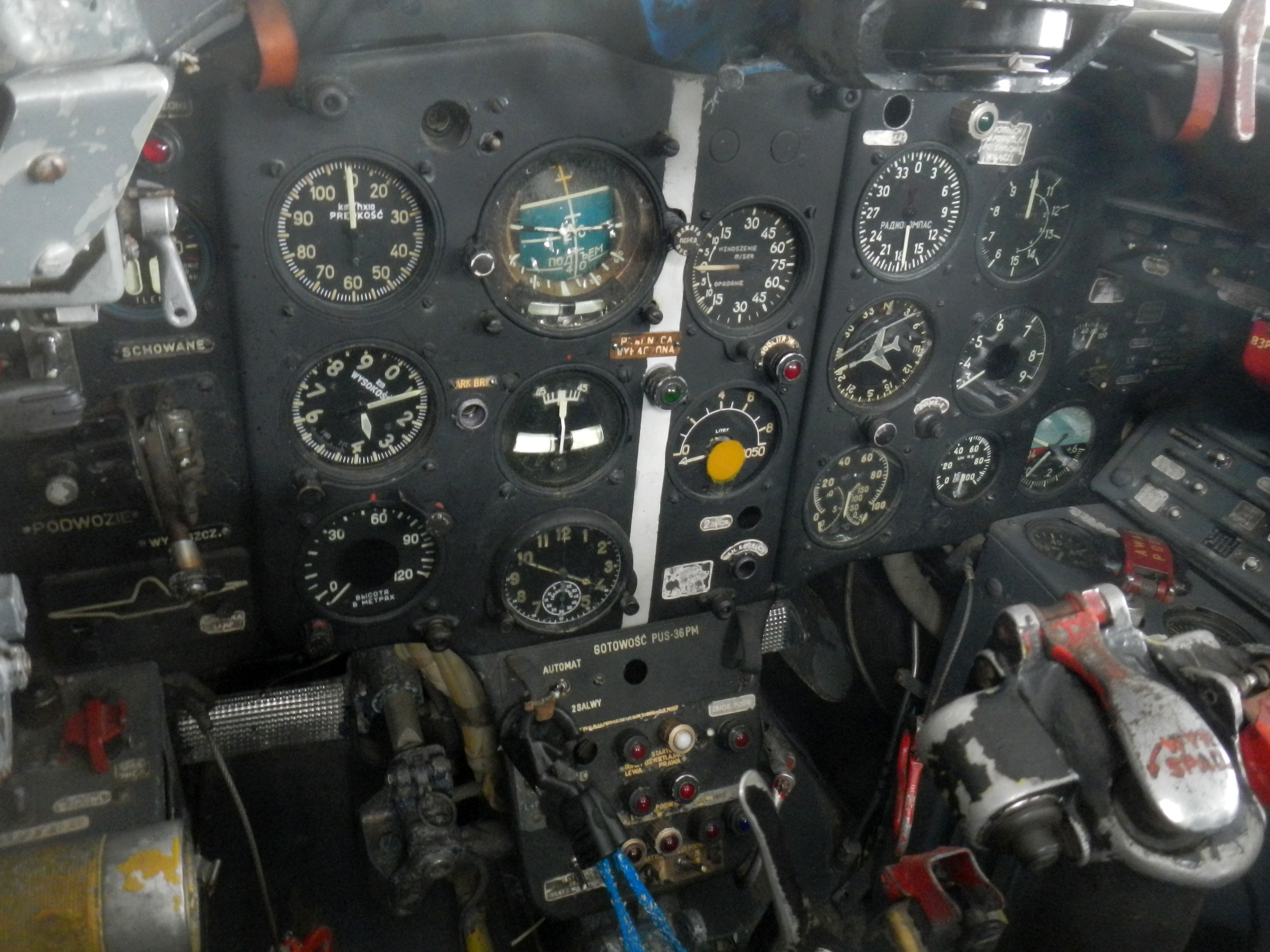
Cockpit view, LIM 6bis Fresco; MAPS air museum, North Canton, Ohio.

General characteristics

- Crew: 1
- Length: 11.36 m (37 ft 3 in)
- Wingspan: 9.628 m (31 ft 7 in)
- Height: 3.8 m (12 ft 6 in)
- Airfoil: root: TsAGI S-12; tip: TsAGI SR-11
- Empty weight: 4,271 kg (9,416 lb)
- Gross weight: 5,651 kg (12,458 lb)
- Max takeoff weight: 6,652 kg (14,665 lb)
- Powerplant: 1 × Lis-5 centrifugal-flow turbojet engine, 33.1 kN (7,400 lbf) thrust

Performance

- Maximum speed: 1,150 km/h (710 mph, 620 kn)
- Range: 1,080 km (670 mi, 580 nmi)
- Service ceiling: 16,470 m (54,040 ft)

Armament

- 1 × 37 mm N-37D cannon (40 rounds)
- 2 × 23 mm NR-23 cannon (80 rounds each)
- 780 kg (1,720 lb) of bombs, rocket launchers or napalm tanks on 4 pylons

== See also ==
Related development

- Mikoyan-Gurevich MiG-15
- Mikoyan-Gurevich MiG-17
- Shenyang J-5

Aircraft of comparable role, configuration, and era

- Fiat G.91
- Dassault Mystère
- Dassault Mystère IV
- F-86 Sabre
- Hawker Hunter

Related lists

- List of military aircraft of the Soviet Union and the CIS
- List of fighter aircraft
