= Smyk (car) =

Polish microcar

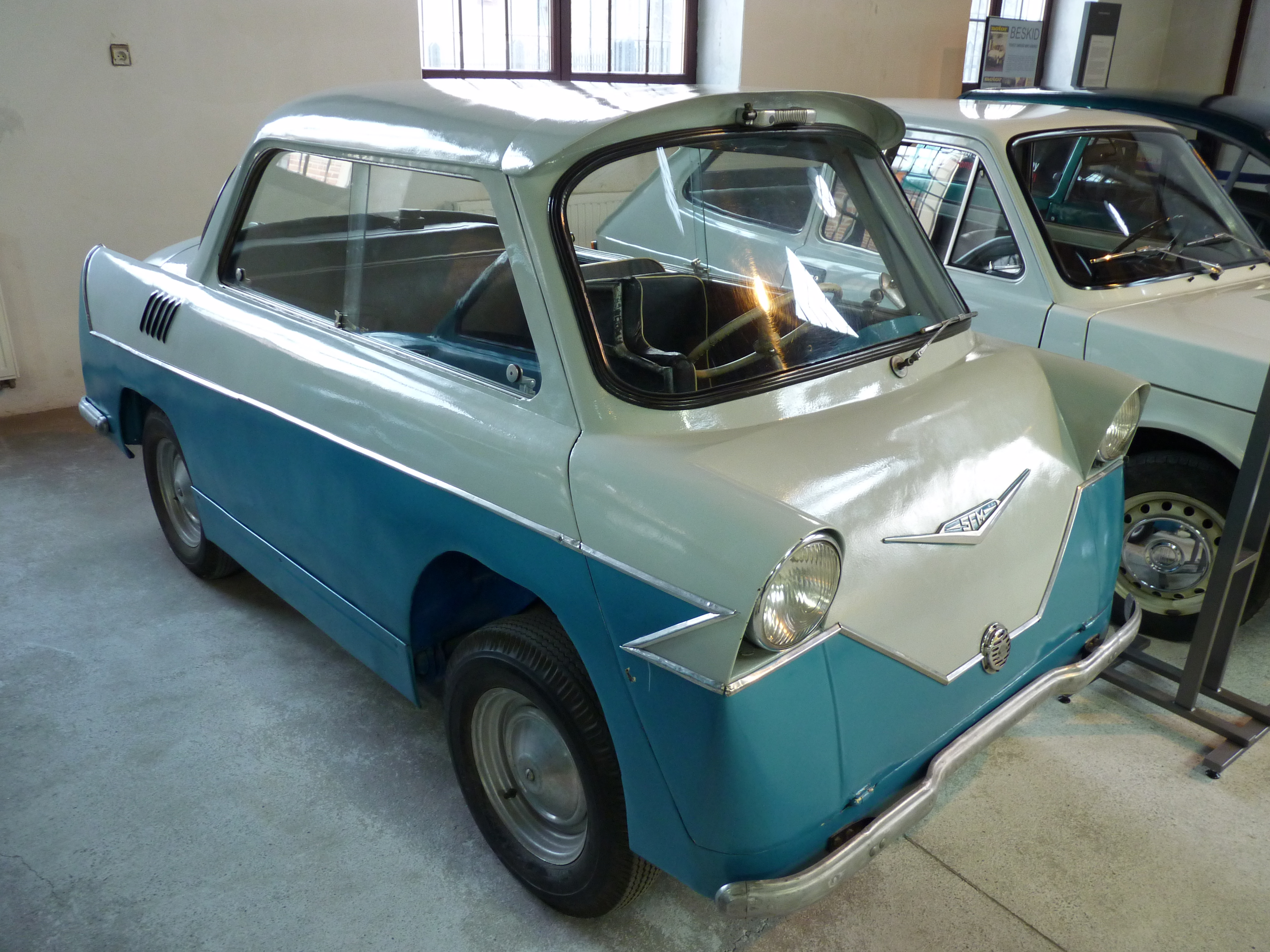

Overview
- Manufacturer: Biuro Konstrukcji Przemysłu Motoryzacyjnego
- Production: 1957–1959

Body and chassis
- Class: Microcar
- Layout: Rear-wheel drive
- Related: Mikrus MR-300

Powertrain
- Engine: S03 (from Junak motorcycle), 1 cylinder, four-stroke, 11kW/5500rpm, 349ccm, compression 6.8:1
- Transmission: 4(+4 reverse) speed

Dimensions
- Wheelbase: 1,700 mm (66.9 in)
- Length: 2,950 mm (116.1 in)
- Width: 1,300 mm (51.2 in)
- Height: 1,370 mm (53.9 in)
- Curb weight: 470 kg (1,036 lb)

The Smyk was a Polish microcar prototype designed in 1957. Its unique characteristic was that the door was located in the front of the car.

== Concept ==
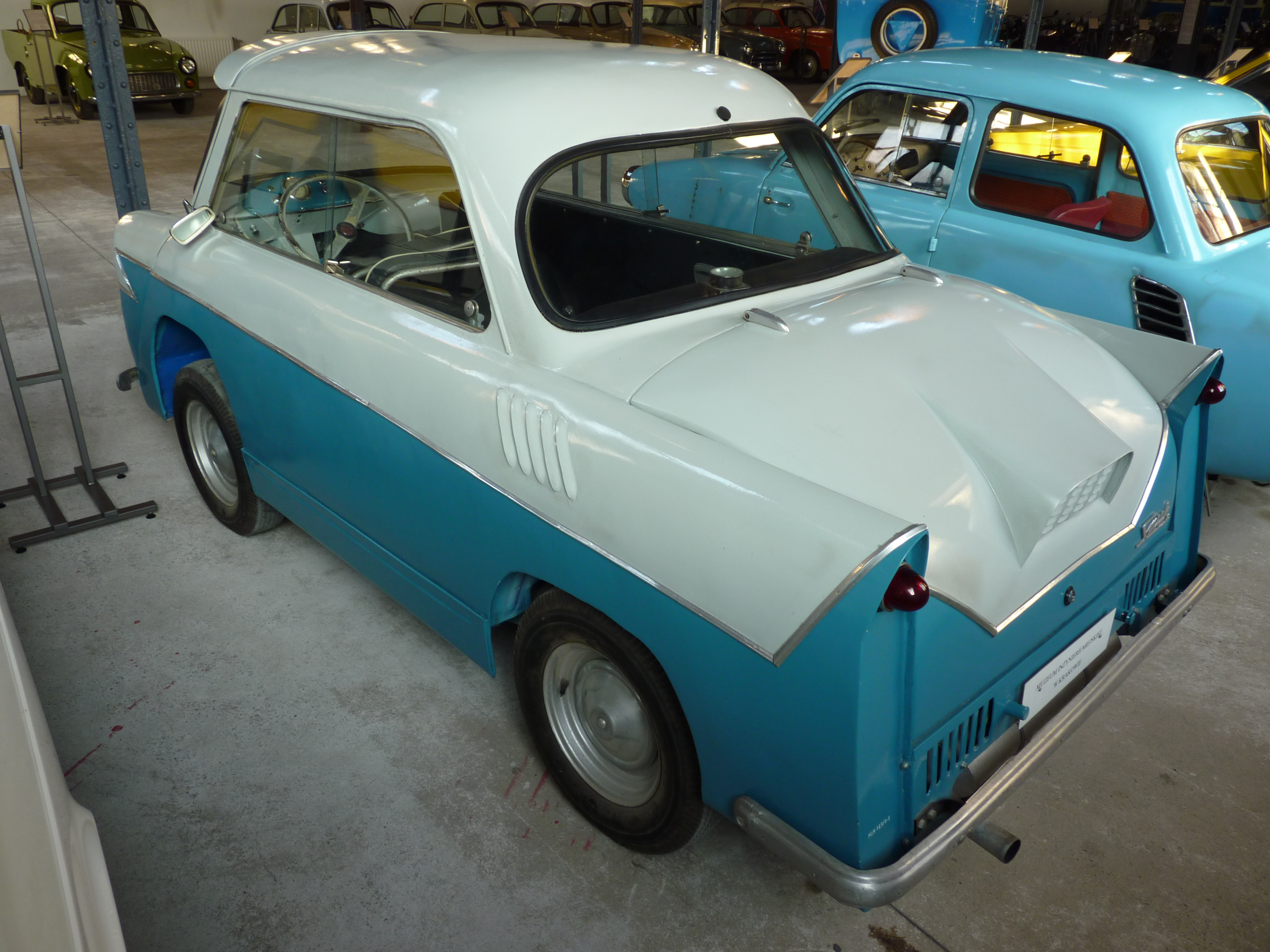
Smyk rear view

The objectives were to create the cheapest possible microcar accommodating four people in the 2+2 system, i.e. two adults and two children. Access to the rear seat was possible only after folding the front passenger seat. The door was a tilting (downwards) front cover, so that the sides of the body could carry loads, and the shape of the body itself did not require deeper extrusion. The car did not have a trunk, and on the dashboard there was only a speedometer, a battery charging indicator and a turn signal switch with an indicator light.

As a drive for prototype vehicles served the engine from the Junak M07 motorcycle with a dynamostarter and a blower installed. Independent suspension was used for all four twelve-inch wheels: transversely arranged torsion bars. The wheels were assembled from two parts, of which the inner, light metal served at the same time as the wheel hub, and the outer, steel one as the right wheel. Smyk was also built with a body made of three-layer laminates.

Smyk was to be manufactured at Szczecińska Fabryka Motocykli (SFM) plant in Szczecin. However, plans for its production were shelved, as another microcar, Mikrus MR-300, was approved for serial production. Only a trial series of 17 (or 20, according to other sources) Smyks were produced by SFM.

The designers of the vehicle were:

- Karol Wójcicki
- architect Janusz Zygadlewicz
- Andrzej Zgliczyński

The project was the result of cooperation between Kończykowski, Ossowski, Sawicki, Zaręba, Sitnicki and others.

== Specifications ==
Top speed: 70 km/h (43 mph)

Fuel consumption: 5 L/100 km

== Existing examples ==
There are about 10 Smyks still in existence. These are located as follows:

- Museum of Municipal Engineering in Krakow – 1
- Museum of Technology in Warsaw – 2
- Museum of Technology and Communication in Szczecin – 2
- In private ownership – approx. 5
