= PZL Mielec =

Polish aerospace manufacturer

Coordinates: 50°18′36″N 21°27′40″E

- Formerly: WSK-Mielec; WSK "PZL-Mielec"
- Industry: Aerospace
- Founded: 1939
- Headquarters: Mielec, Poland
- Number of employees: 1,600 (2021)
- Parent: PZL (1939); Heinkel (1939–1944); PZL (1944–1989); Sikorsky Aircraft (2007–Present); Lockheed Martin (2015–Present)
- Website: pzlmielec.pl

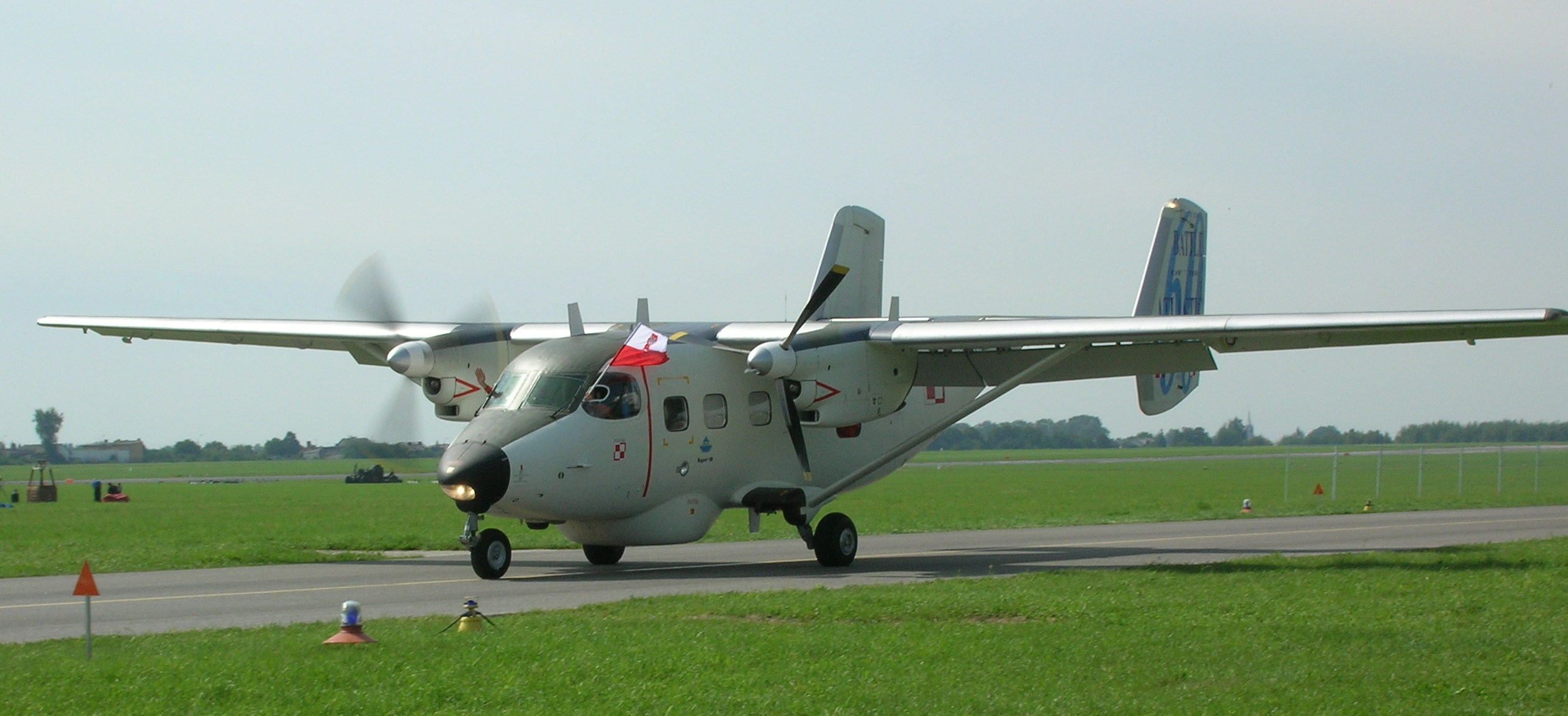
PZL M-28B Bryza 1R of the Polish Navy, currently produced by PZL Mielec

PZL Mielec (Polskie Zakłady Lotnicze - Polish Aviation Works), formerly WSK-Mielec (Wytwórnia Sprzętu Komunikacyjnego) and WSK "PZL-Mielec" is a Polish aerospace manufacturer based in Mielec. It is the largest aerospace manufacturer in postwar Poland. In 2007, it was acquired by Sikorsky Aircraft Corporation, now a unit of Lockheed Martin, which retained the brand name. Between 1948 and 2014, the company manufactured approximately 15,600 aircraft.

== History ==
=== Before 1945 ===
In 1938-1939, Państwowe Zakłady Lotnicze ("State Aviation Works"; PZL), Poland's largest aviation company, built a factory in Mielec, designated PZL WP-2 (Wytwórnia Płatowców 2; "Airframe Factory no. 2"). Production there began just before the outbreak of World War II. In March 1939, the plant began manufacturing its first aircraft — PZL.37 Łoś bombers, assembled from components delivered from the PZL WP-1 factory in Warsaw. There were 700 workers at that time.

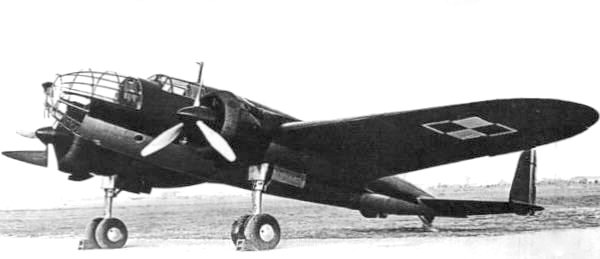
PZL.37 Łoś

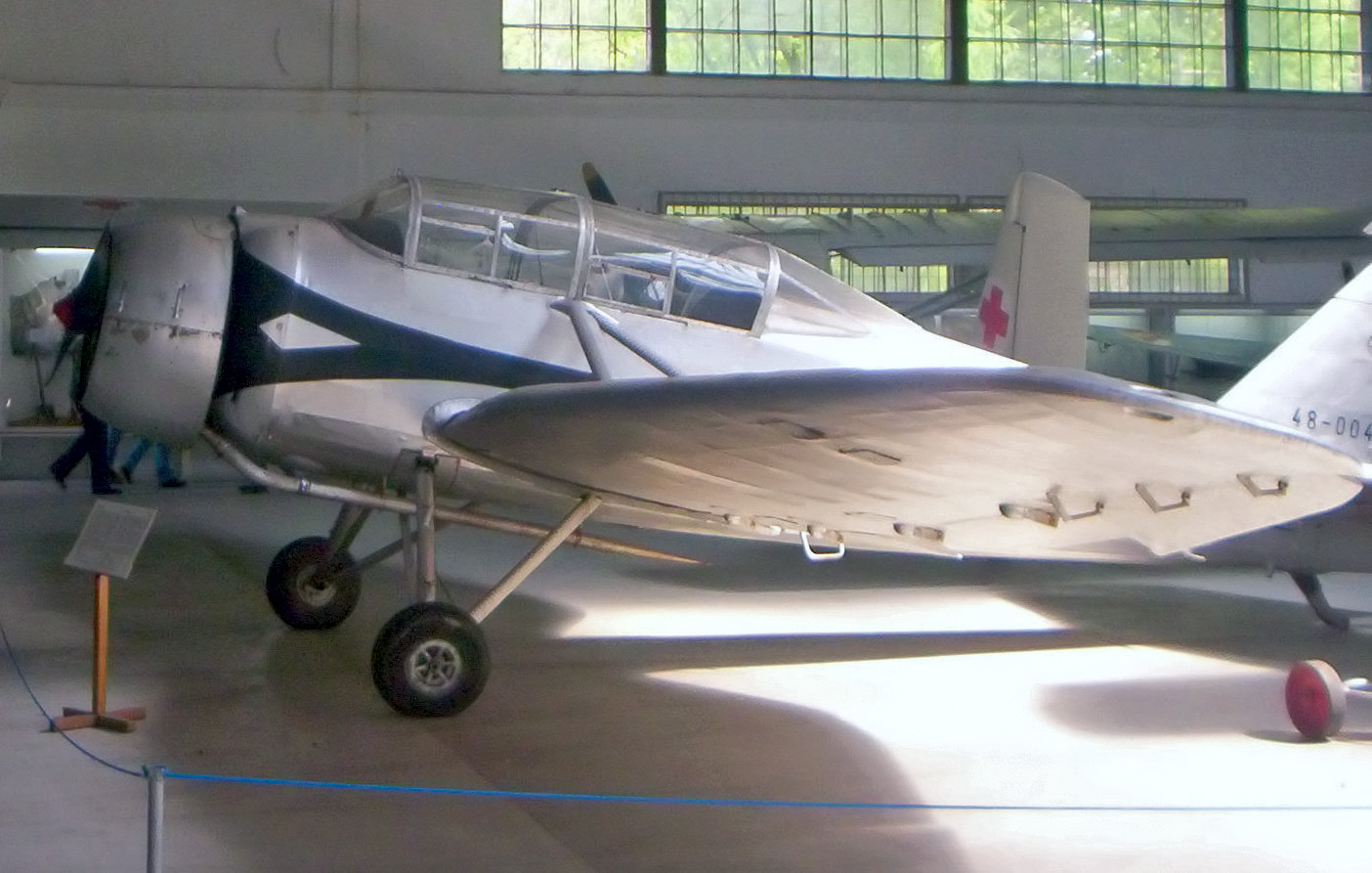
LWD Szpak-4T

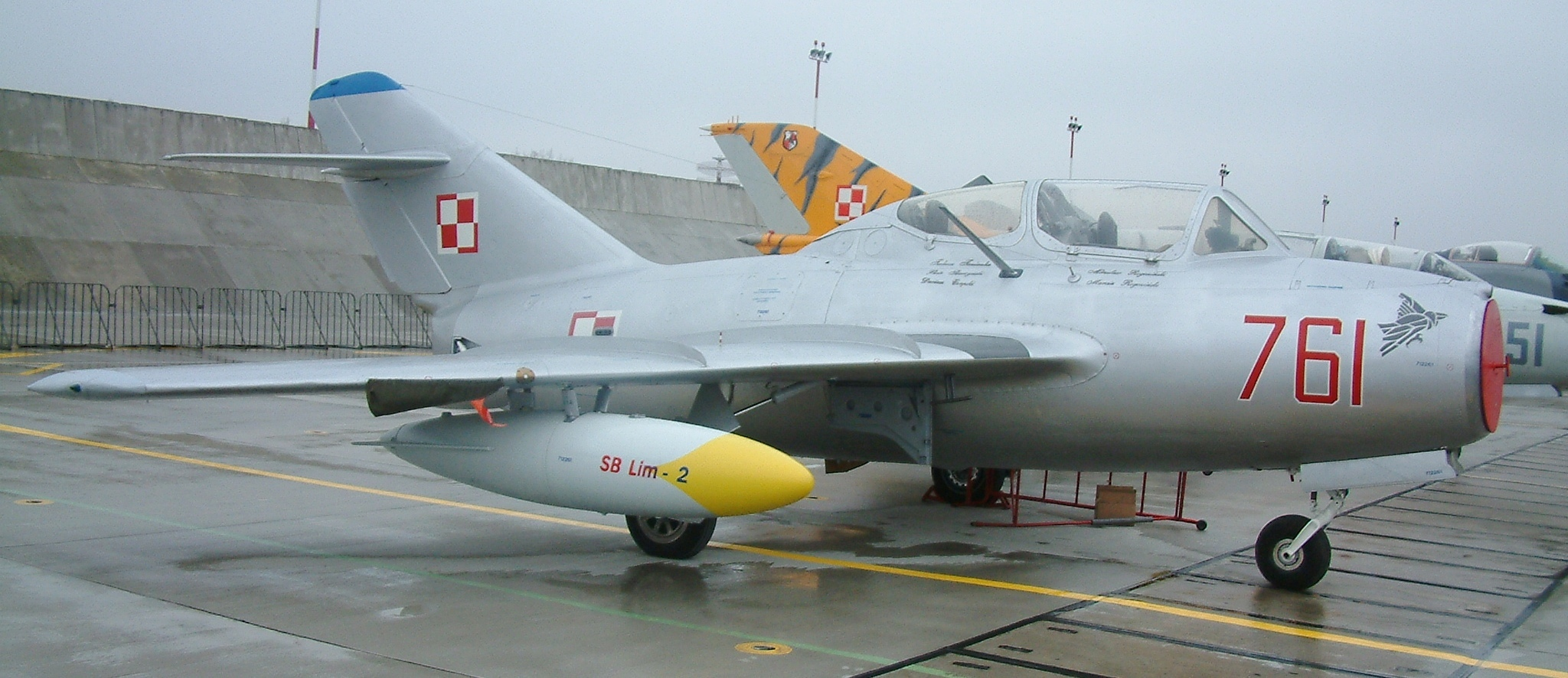
SBLim-2 (Lim-2 trainer variant)

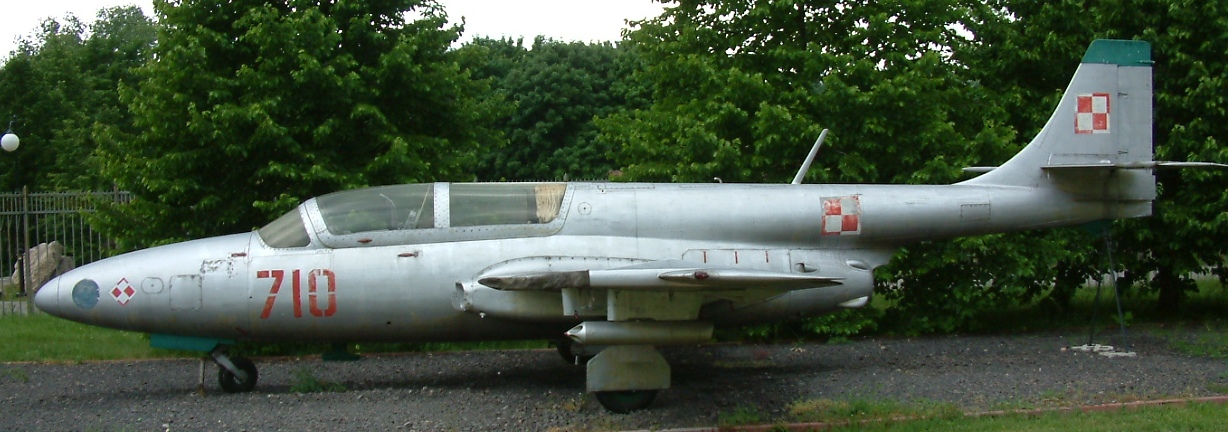
TS-11 Iskra

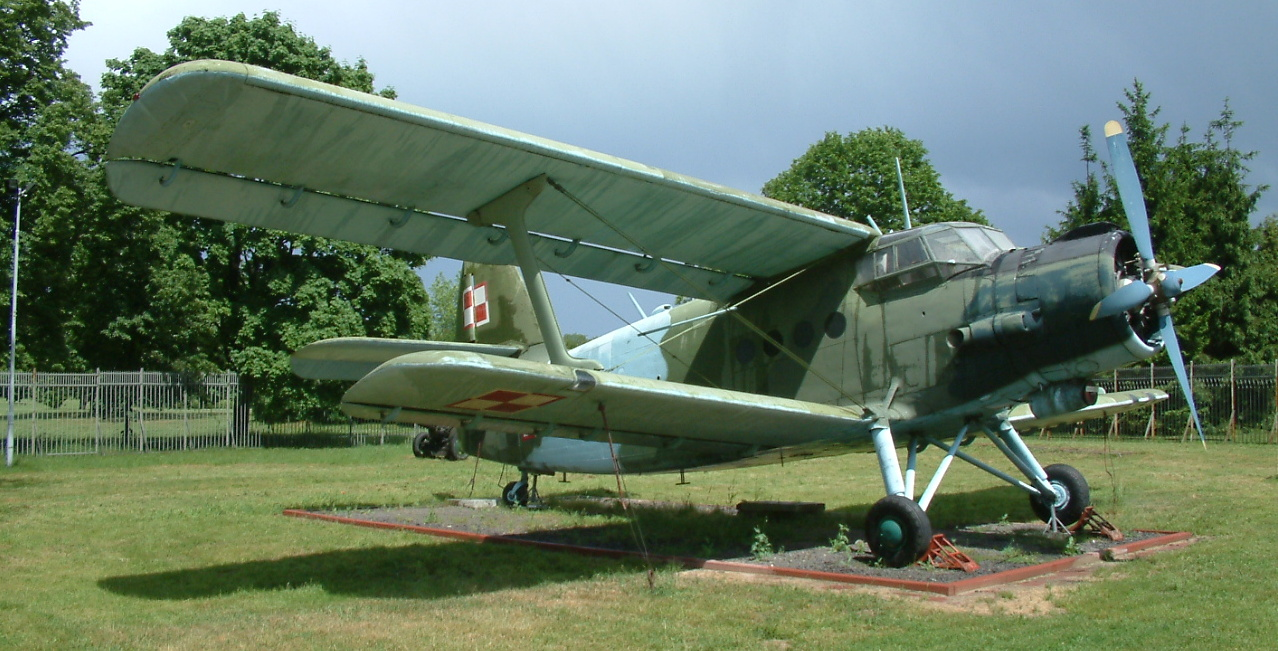
License-built PZL An-2

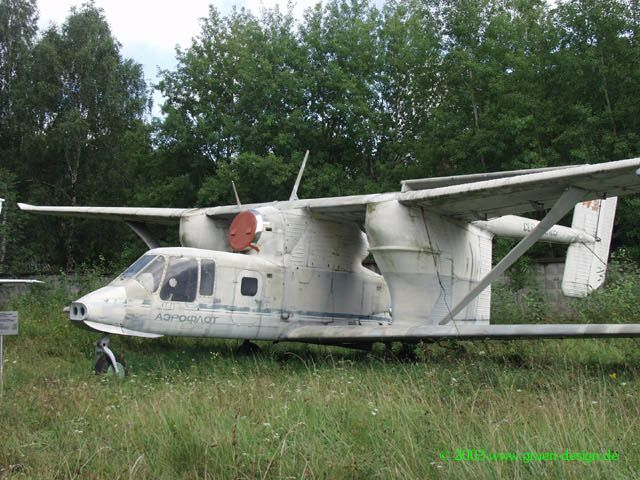
PZL M-15 Belphegor jet agricultural aircraft

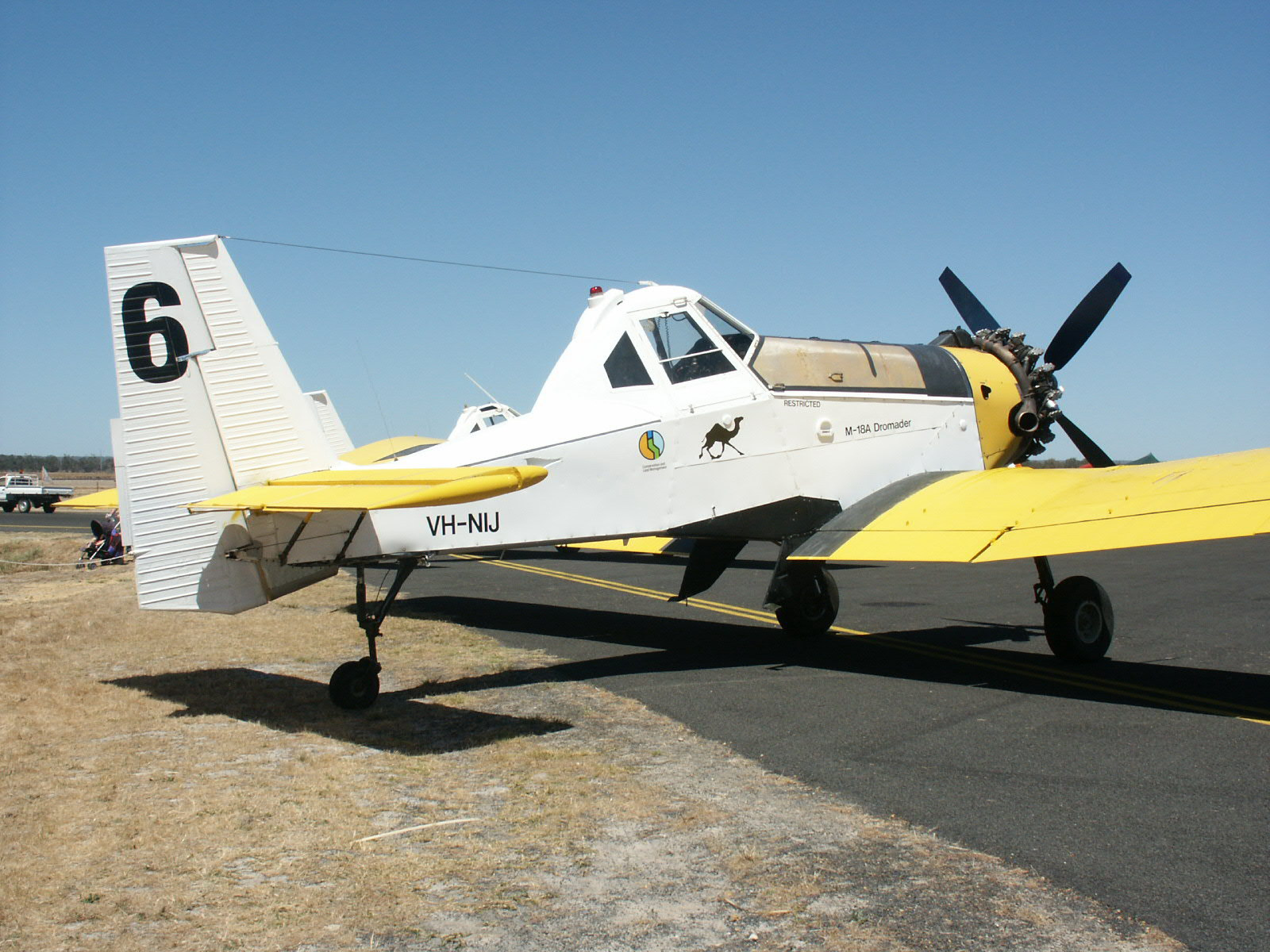
PZL M-18 Dromader

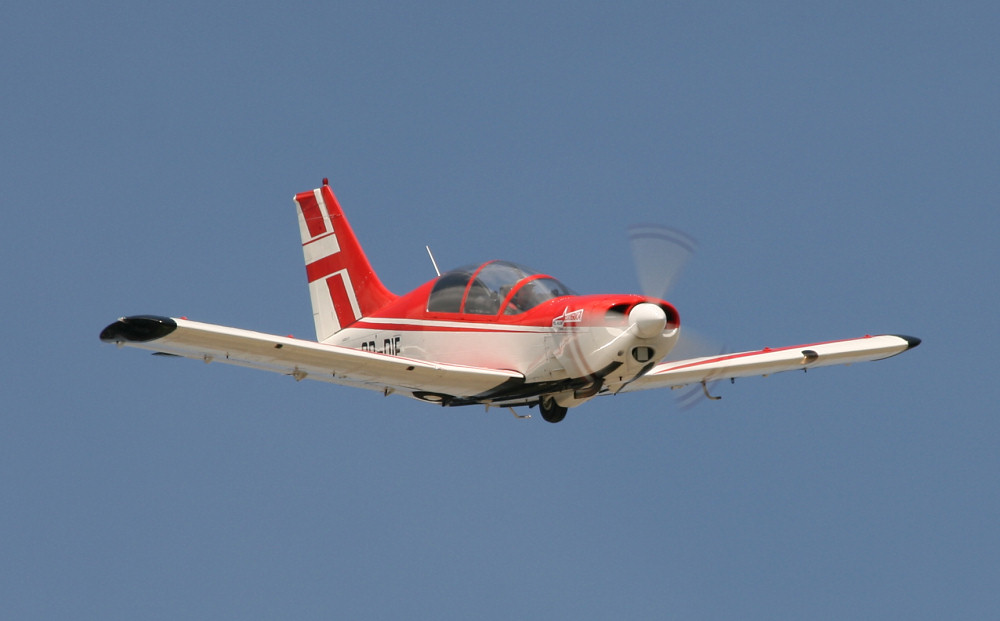
PZL M26 Iskierka

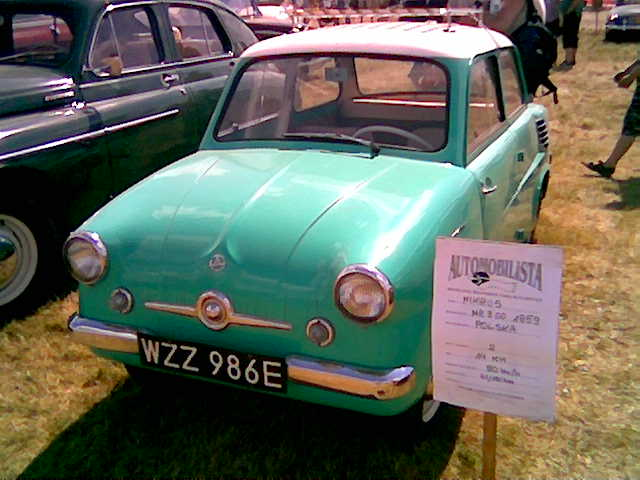
Mikrus micro car

During World War II, Mielec was occupied by Nazi Germany, starting 13 September 1939. During the occupation, the factory became a part of Heinkel, among others producing tailfins of Heinkel He 111 bombers, and repairing Junkers Ju 52 aircraft. There were 5,500 workers in 1944. In July 1944, the withdrawing Germans took away all the machines and equipment. Mielec was seized by the Soviet Army on 6 August 1944. At first, the factory was used by the Soviets as a repair works. On 22 July 1945, it was handed back to Polish control.

=== 1945 to present ===
The factory in Mielec was renamed to Państwowe Zakłady Lotnicze (PZL) - Zakład nr 1 (State Aviation Works, No.1 plant), and turned into a state-owned factory. At first, it undertook aircraft repair works, and produced mostly non-aviation items, such as bus bodies, scales, etc. The first aircraft constructed in Mielec was a simple trainer PZL S-1, flown on 15 November 1945, of which only one unit was built (this was the second aircraft built in Poland after the war).

The factory in Mielec produced aircraft mostly under license, or designed in other Polish bureaus. In 1948, the factory built a small series of 10 utility aircraft LWD Szpak-4T, designed in the LWD (it was the first Polish post-war series-built aircraft). In the same year, the company started producing licensed Polikarpov Po-2 biplanes under the designation CSS-13, and 180 were built by 1950 (they were also produced by PZL Warszawa-Okęcie). In 1950, also a small series of pre-war Polish Salamandra gliders was built.

In 1949, the factory was renamed, like all Polish aerospace industry at that time, as Wytwórnia Sprzętu Komunikacyjnego – zakład nr 1 (Communication Equipment Factory, No. 1 plant), in short WSK-1 Mielec or just WSK-Mielec. For a short time in 1970-1975, it bore a name WSK Delta-Mielec. In 1975, it returned to a traditional name Wytwórnia Sprzętu Komunikacyjnego "PZL-Mielec" (WSK "PZL-Mielec"), in an honor of the PZL brand. In the 1950s, there were 2600 workers; at its peak the number was 18,000.

From 1950, the factory developed significantly, and became the largest Polish aircraft producer. It was a licensed producer of the Soviet-designed jet fighters MiG-15 (produced as Lim-1), MiG-15bis (Lim-2), MiG-17 (Lim-5), and their Polish-developed variants (the SBLim-1 and SBLim-2 trainers and the Lim-6 attack aircraft). The first Lim-1s were manufactured from Soviet parts in 1952, and full-scale production started in 1953. About 1500 Lims were built by 1964. In 1957-1960, there were also produced 250 Polish-designed TS-8 Bies piston-engined trainers. From 1963, there was produced Polish-designed jet trainer TS-11 Iskra, being a basic trainer in Polish military aviation. Its successor, designed with a part of PZL Mielec, the PZL I-22 Iryda, appeared to be a failure for different reasons, mostly due to a lack of proper funding, and as such only a small series was built.

The most numerous aircraft built in Mielec was the licensed Soviet Antonov An-2 utility biplane, produced from 1960 in different variants. 11,954 of these aircraft were manufactured by 2002, mostly for the Soviets, but also used in Poland, and exported to other countries. Among them there were 7880 agricultural An-2R, 1640 transport-passenger An-2TP, 1344 transport An-2T, 816 passenger An-2P, 154 An-2M floatplanes, 52 An-2TD military paratroop transports, 44 executive An-2P Lux. From 1984, PZL Mielec became an exclusive producer of the Soviet Antonov An-28 STOL transport aircraft, of which 180 were built. It was subsequently developed in Mielec, and in a modernized variant PZL M-28 Skytruck/Bryza, with western avionics, was offered for the Polish Army, Polish Navy and services abroad, with some success, also as a maritime patrol aircraft.

Apart from license production, several aircraft were designed at Mielec in the 1950s and 1960s, but they did not enter production (e.g PZL S-4 Kania, PZL M-2, PZL M-4 Tarpan). More profitable was cooperation in design work. In 1973, with Soviet aid, Mielec designed the only jet agricultural aircraft in the world, the WSK-Mielec M-15 Belphegor, which was built between 1976 and 1981 for the Soviets. On the other hand, the factory started cooperation with American firms, and the result was the very successful agricultural aircraft M-18 Dromader, first flown in 1976, and produced and developed until now (as of 2012). Over 759 were produced, most exported to Western countries. WSK-Mielec also started production of the PZL M-20 Mewa utility aircraft (licensed Piper PA-34 Seneca), but a small number was built only. Partly based on the M-20, the factory developed a successful light trainer PZL M-26 Iskierka of 1988; however, only seven were built.

=== Non-aviation production ===
The factory produced also non-aviation items, like fire engines (1948), refrigerators (1954–1966), Mikrus MR-300 microcar (1956–1960, 1728 built), refrigerator car bodies (1962–1974), TV broadcast cars (from 1965), fuel injection equipment (from 1964), Leyland-licence diesel engines (from 1967), Melex electric utility vehicles and golf carts (from 1970, mostly for export to the USA, later separated as own brand). In 1993, a division Wytwórnia Aparatury Wtryskowej "PZL Mielec" (Fuel Injection Equipment Factory "PZL–Mielec") was separated as a limited liability company.

=== Present and future ===
On 19 October 1998, a state-owned factory WSK "PZL-Mielec" was converted into a state-owned company Polskie Zakłady Lotnicze Mielec Sp. z o.o. (Polish Aviation Works), in short: PZL Mielec (not to be confused with pre-war PZL - Państwowe Zakłady Lotnicze). In May 1999, it was certified according to JAR-21. After a fall of export to Eastern Bloc countries, production volume decreased, and there remained 1200-1400 workers.

On 16 March 2007, PZL Mielec was acquired by the Sikorsky Aircraft Corporation, then a unit of United Technologies Corporation (UTX), now a unit of Lockheed Martin. From 2009, it manufactures fuselage sections of the parent firm's UH-60M Black Hawk helicopter, and from 2010 it serves as an additional final assembly line for S-70i Black Hawk helicopters.

The circumstances of this transaction and its aftermath were heavily criticized by the Polish military press, suggesting that the price was very low (56.1 million PLN), due to pro-American lobbying. It was also pointed out that the Polish military agreed in December 2008 to purchase 12 unnecessary M-28B aircraft from the new factory owners, for a price two or three times higher than their real value and export price.

== Aircraft ==
Model name	First flight	Number built	Type
CSS-13	1948	180	License built single piston engine biplane utility airplane
PZL Szpak-4T	1948	10	Single piston engine monoplane utility airplane
PZL S-1	1945	1	Single piston engine monoplane trainer
PZL S-4 Kania	1957	3	Single piston engine monoplane trainer
PZL TS-8 Bies	1955	251	Single piston engine monoplane trainer
PZL M2	1958	2	Single piston engine monoplane trainer
PZL M3 Pliszka	1959	3	Glider
PZL M7	N/A	0	Two jet engine monoplane trainer
PZL M8 Pelikan	N/A	0	Glider
PZL M4 Tarpan	1961	2	Single piston engine monoplane trainer
PZL An-2	1961	11,000+	License built single piston engine biplane utility airplane
PZL Lim-1	1952	227	License built single jet engine monoplane fighter
PZL Lim-2		500	License built single jet engine monoplane fighter
PZL Lim-5	1956	666	License built single jet engine monoplane fighter
PZL Lim-6		110	License built single jet engine monoplane attack airplane
PZL TS-11 Iskra	1960	424	Single jet engine monoplane trainer
PZL TS-16 Grot	N/A	0	Single jet engine monoplane trainer
PZL M12	N/A	0	Two piston engine monoplane utility airplane
PZL M19	N/A	0	Two jet engine monoplane trainer
PZL M14	N/A	0	Single turboprop engine monoplane agricultural airplane
PZL M15 Belphegor	1973	175	Single jet engine biplane agricultural airplane
PZL M16	N/A	0	Two jet engine monoplane trainer
PZL M18 Dromader	1976	759	Single piston engine monoplane agricultural airplane
PZL M17	1977	1	Single piston engine monoplane utility airplane
PZL M20 Mewa	1979	33	Two piston engine monoplane utility airplane
PZL M19	N/A	0	Two turboprop engine monoplane transport airplane
PZL M21 Dromader Mini	1982	2	Single piston engine monoplane agricultural airplane
PZL M24 Dromader Super	1987	4	Single piston engine monoplane agricultural airplane
PZL M25 Dromader Mikro	N/A	0	Single piston engine monoplane agricultural airplane
PZL M26 Iskierka	1986	9	Single piston engine monoplane trainer
PZL An-28	1984		Two turboprop engine monoplane transport
PZL M28 Skytruck	1993		Two turboprop engine monoplane transport
PZL M30	N/A	0	Single turboprop engine monoplane agricultural airplane
PZL M32	N/A	0	Two turboprop engine monoplane utility aircraft
PZL M34	N/A	0	Two turboprop engine monoplane transport
PZL I-22 Iryda	1985	17	Two jet engine monoplane trainer
PZL S-70i Blackhawk	2010	100	Two turboshaft engine utility helicopter
