= Mikrus MR-300 =

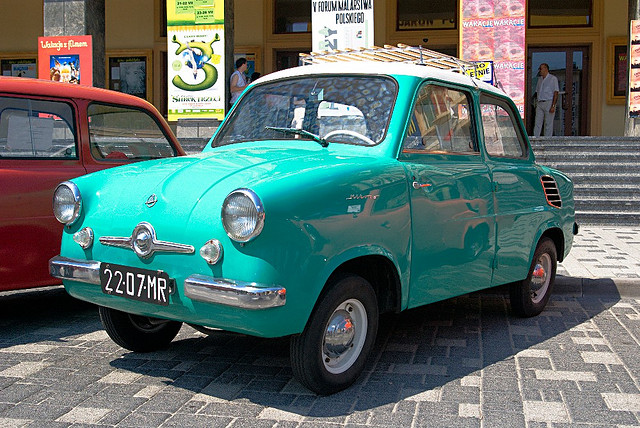

Overview
- Manufacturer: WSK Mielec
- Also called: WSK Mikrus
- Production: 1957–1960
- Assembly: Poland: Mielec

Body and chassis
- Class: Microcar (A)
- Body style: 2-door sedan (2+2 seats)
- Layout: RR layout

Powertrain
- Engine: R2 296 cc 10,7 kW (14,5 hp)
- Transmission: 4

Dimensions
- Wheelbase: 1,850 mm (72.8 in)
- Length: 3,025 mm (119.1 in)
- Width: 1,315 mm (51.8 in)
- Height: 1,350 mm (53.1 in)
- Curb weight: 472 kg (1,041 lb)

The Mikrus MR-300 was a Polish microcar produced between 1957 and 1960 with a body built by WSK Mielec and engines by WSK Rzeszów. Only 1,728 units were built.

== Model history ==
The MR-300 was designed as a cheap car for the masses. The idea to design this construction, one of very few automobiles manufactured in Poland, arose coincidentally. At the end of 1956 the authorities decided to make use of spare production capacity at the aerospace manufacturers WSK Mielec and WSK Rzeszów. At the time, both plants were only producing planes and motorcycles. The new plan was to add automobile manufacture as well. During the initial period WSK Rzeszów prepared plans for the engine, while WSK Mielec focused on the chassis and bodywork. The design was presented at the beginning of 1957, during the National Automotive Meeting. The first prototypes were presented on 22 July 1957 in Warsaw. The new car was named Mikrus MR 300 (taking its name from the initials of the words Mielec and Rzeszów). By the end of the year, the first cars left the assembly plant. In addition, two convertible models were available.

Press reports at the time stated: Taking into consideration the price, which should not exceed the price of a similar cubic capacity motorcycle by more than 25–30% we may assume that it will constitute a very popular means of transportation for a wide spectrum of users. The Mikrus turned out to be very popular. However, the high cost of manufacture prevented the idea from developing into a mass, individual motorization. At the same time, the high price of the vehicle meant few could afford it. The Mikrus cost 50 thousand Polish Złoty, the average of 50 salaries. The much larger Warszawa cost 120 thousand Polish Złoty.

== Mikrus pick-up ==
In 1960 when the manufacture of the Mikrus was ended by WSK Mielec construction office prepared within 10 days a prototype of a pick-up version. This was in response to a Government directive which ordered the manufacturers to produce a compact panel truck. The demand of the Polish market was estimated at the level of 100 thousand units. The vehicle could transport a load not exceeding 200 kg (441 lb). The same arrangement of wheels and suspension as in the original was used. The loading part could be covered with a canvas cloak. Like the convertible, this design was never produced.

== Technical details ==
- Engine:
  - MI-10A two-stroke, 2 cylinder, 296cc (18 cu.in) inline engine, carburetor fed, 14.5HP.
- Fuel:
  - 2-stroke mix (96 percent gasoline, 4 percent mineral oil).
- Body:
  - 2 door sedan (2+2 seats).
  - Monocoque
- Dimension:
  - Length – 3,025 mm (119.1 in)
  - Width – 1,315 mm (51.8 in)
  - Height – 1,350 mm (53.1 in)
  - Wheelbase – 1,025 mm (40.4 in)
  - Trunk capacity – 200 dm3
  - Gas tank – 27,5 dm3
  - Size of tires – 4,40 * 10
- Mass: 472 kg (1,041 lb)
- Load capacity: 228 kg (503 lb)
- Performance:
  - Maximum speed – 90 km/h (56 mph)
  - Turning back diameter – 8 m (310 in)
  - Fuel economy: 4 L/100 km (59mpg)

== Gallery ==
Early version

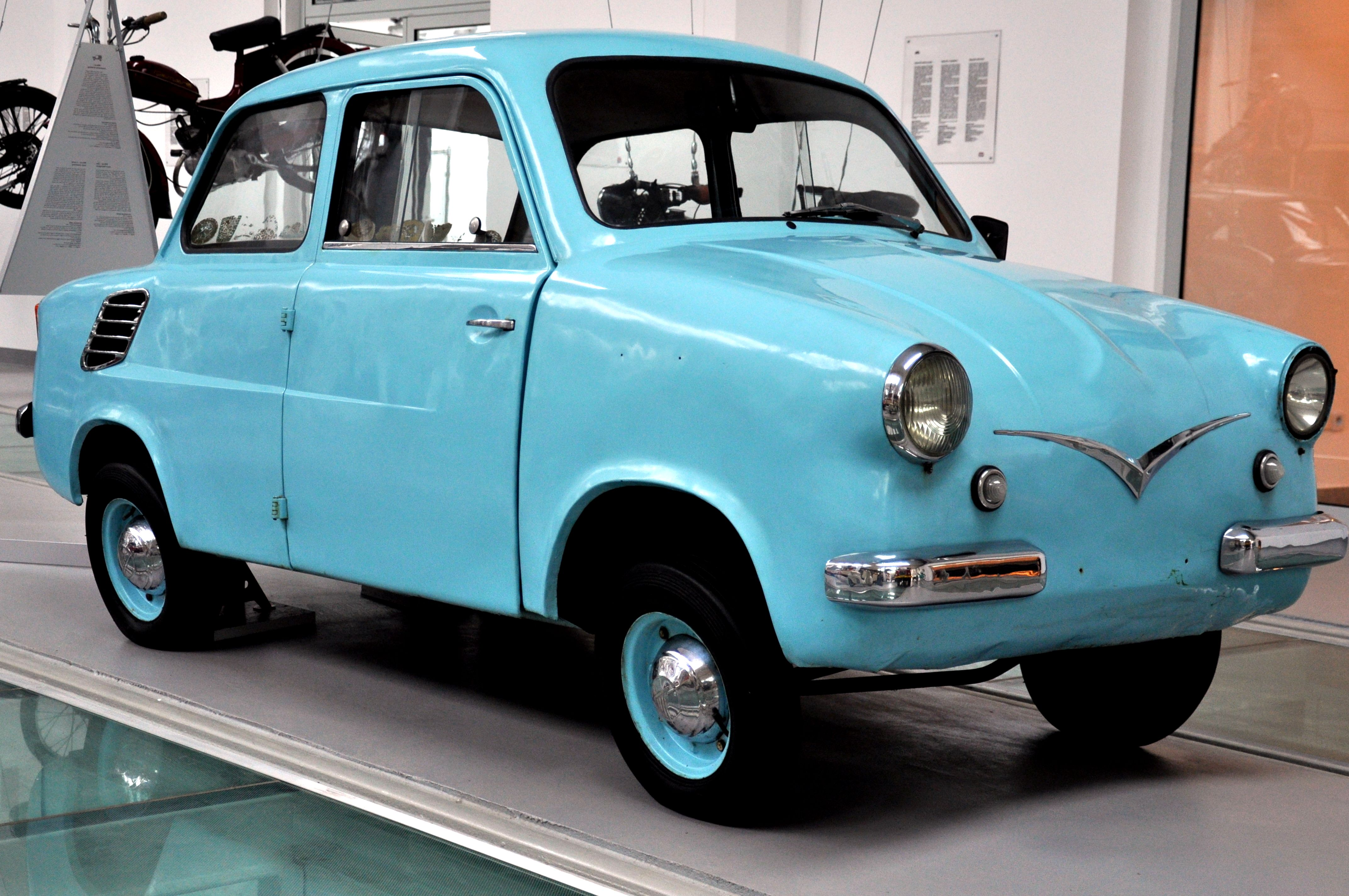
Whith new grille

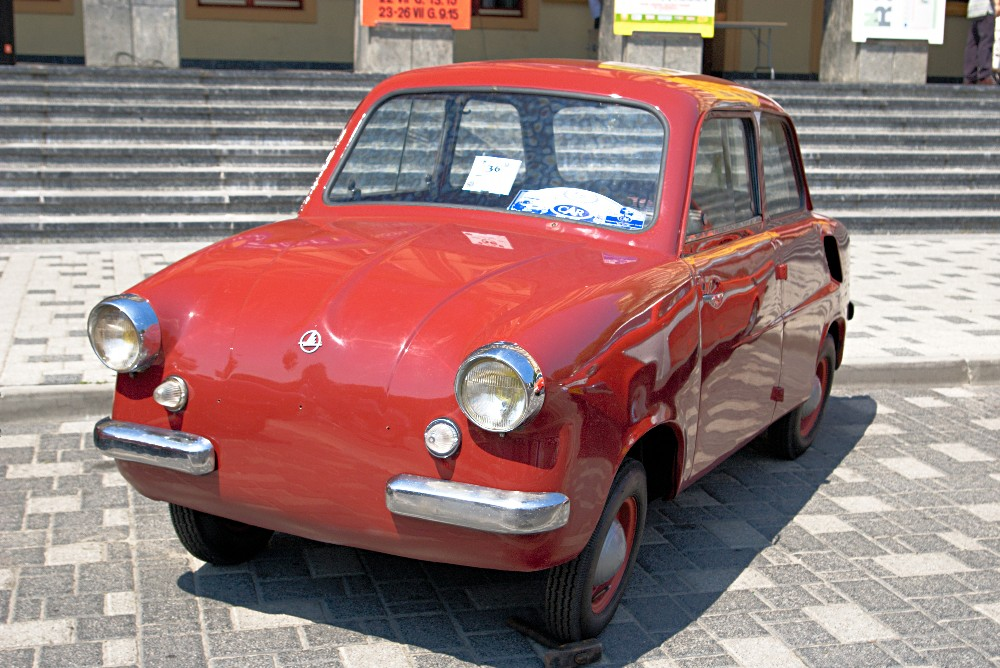
Without grille

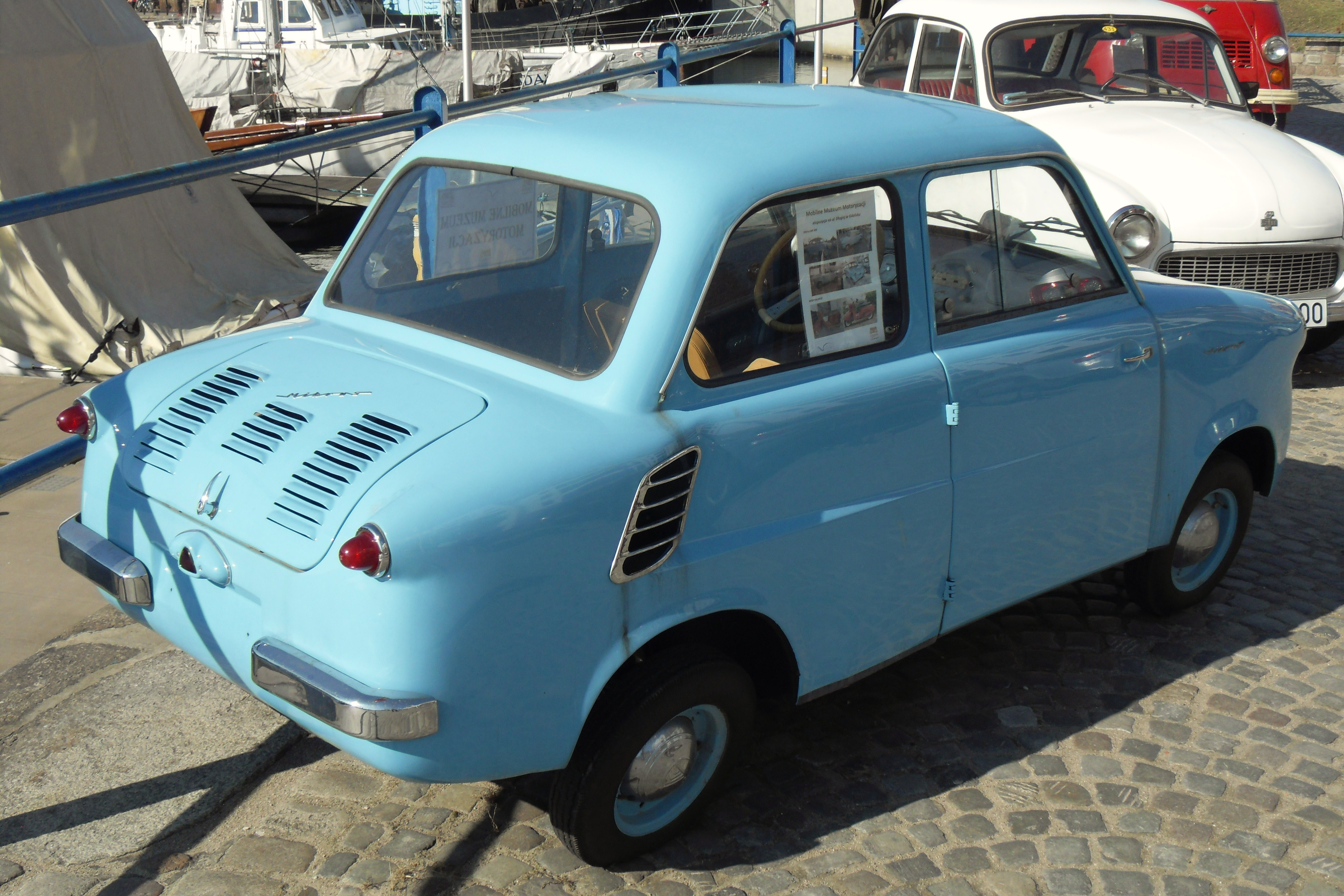
Rear view

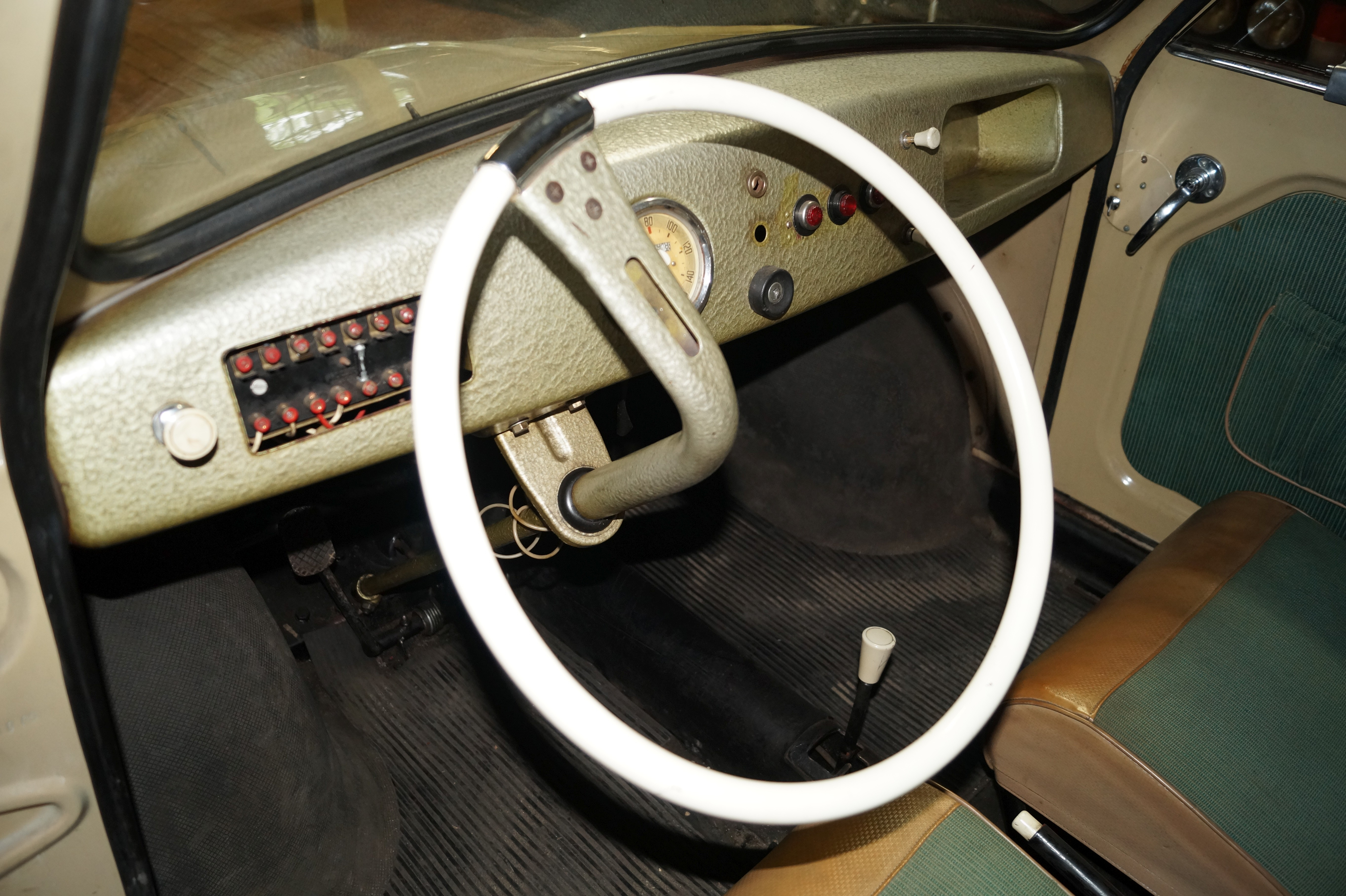
Interior
