= Lists of aviation topics =

Overview of aviation-related articles

The following lists relate to aviation:

== General ==
- Lists of aircraft
  - List of aircraft manufacturers
  - List of aircraft by tail number
- List of aircraft engines
  - List of aircraft engine manufacturers
- List of aerospace flight test centres
- List of transponder codes
- List of test pilot schools
- List of air display teams
- Lists of airlines
  - Lists of defunct airlines
  - List of helicopter airlines
- Lists of airports
- List of civil aviation authorities
- List of gliders
  - Glider types
- List of aviation museums
- Air Navigation Act 1920
- Aircraft registration
  - List of aircraft registration prefixes
- List of rotorcraft
  - List of rotorcraft manufacturers by country
- List of Schneider Trophy aircraft

== Military ==
- List of air forces
- List of experimental aircraft
- List of missiles
- List of unmanned aerial vehicles
- List of aircraft weapons
- Lists of military aircraft by nation

Country	Armed Forces	Air Force	Army	Naval	Designation Systems
Afghanistan	-	all	-	-	
Albania	-	all	-	-	
Angola	-	current	-	-	
Argentina	-	all	-	all	
Australia	-	all / current	all	all	
Bahrain	-	current	-	-	
Bangladesh	current	current / historic	-	-	
Belize	all	-	-	-	
Bolivia	-	all	-	-	
Brazil	current	-	-	-	
Brunei	-	all	-	-	
Bulgaria	current / historic	-	-	-	
Cambodia	-	current	-	-	
Canada	current	all	-	historic	
Central African Republic	-	current	-	-	
China	current / historic pre-1937	historic	-	-	
Comoros	current	-	-	-	
Congo (DR)	-	all	-	-	
Czech Republic	all	-	-	-	
Denmark	all	current	-	-	
Djibouti	-	current	-	-	
Dominican Republic	-	all	-	-	
Egypt	current	all	-	-	
El Salvador	current	-	-	-	
Estonia	-	historic	-	-	
Finland	all	-	-	-	
France	current	historic -WW2	-	-	
Georgia	-	current	-	-	
Germany	all / by company	-	-	n/a	Idflieg /
Germany	historic	historic	-	-	RLM system & RLM list
Greece	-	all / historic	-	-	
Hungary	-	current	-	-	
India	current	historic	current	current	
Indonesia	-	all	-	-	
Iran	-	all	-	-	
Ireland	-	all	-	-	
Israel	-	all	-	-	
Italy	-	historic - WW2	-	-	
Ivory Coast	all	-	-	-	
Japan	all	-	-	historic	historic / Allied code names
Malaysia	all	-	-	-	
Moldova	-	all	-	-	
Montenegro	-	all	-	-	
Morocco	current	all	-	-	
New Zealand	all / current	-	-	-	
Norway	all	-	-	-	
Oman	-	all	-	-	
Pakistan	-	all	-	-	
Philippines	current	historic	-	-	
Poland	current	historic / historic - WW2	-	-	
Portugal	all	-	-	all	serials
Qatar	-	all	-	-	
Romania	-	all	current	all	
Serbia	current	-	-	-	
South Africa	-	all	-	-	
South Korea	-	all	-	-	
Spain	-	current	-	-	
Sri Lanka	all	-	-	-	
Sweden	all	-	-	-	
Switzerland	-	all	-	-	
Tanzania	-	current	-	-	
Thailand	-	all	-	-	
Tunisia	-	current	-	-	
Turkey	current	-	current	current	
United Kingdom	all / current	RAF / historic - RFC	all	all / historic - RNAS	AM designations & specs
United States	all / current / historic - pre-1919 / historic - WW2 / NASA / future			pre-1962 / current / Marines	systems & list
Soviet Union/Russia	all / current	historic - WW2	-	-	designation systems
Zimbabwe	-	all	-	-	

- Lists of Bulgarian military aircraft

== Accidents and incidents ==
- List of accidents and incidents involving commercial aircraft
  - List of accidents and incidents involving airliners by location
- List of fatalities from aviation accidents
  - List of aircraft accidents and incidents resulting in at least 50 fatalities
- List of accidents and incidents involving general aviation
- Lists of accidents and incidents involving military aircraft
- List of air rage incidents

== Records ==
- Flight airspeed record
- Flight altitude record
- Flight distance record
- Flight endurance record
- List of firsts in aviation
- List of large aircraft
- List of most-produced aircraft
- List of most-produced rotorcraft
