= List of active Bangladesh military aircraft =

Active Bangladesh military aircraft is a list of military aircraft currently used by the Bangladesh Armed Forces.

For aircraft no longer in-service see: List of historic Bangladesh military aircraft.

== Bangladesh Air Force ==
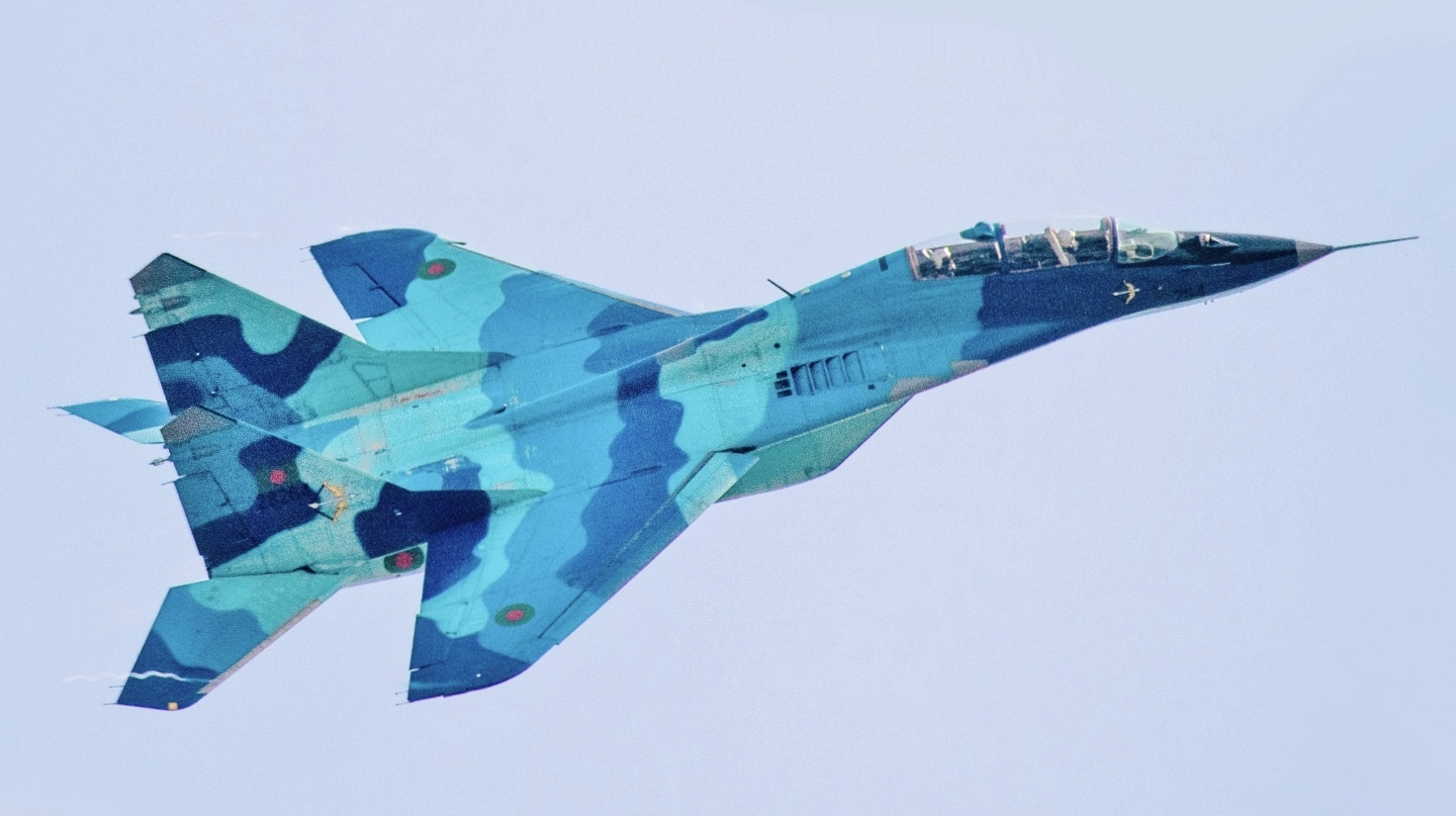
Bangladesh Air Force MIG-29UB

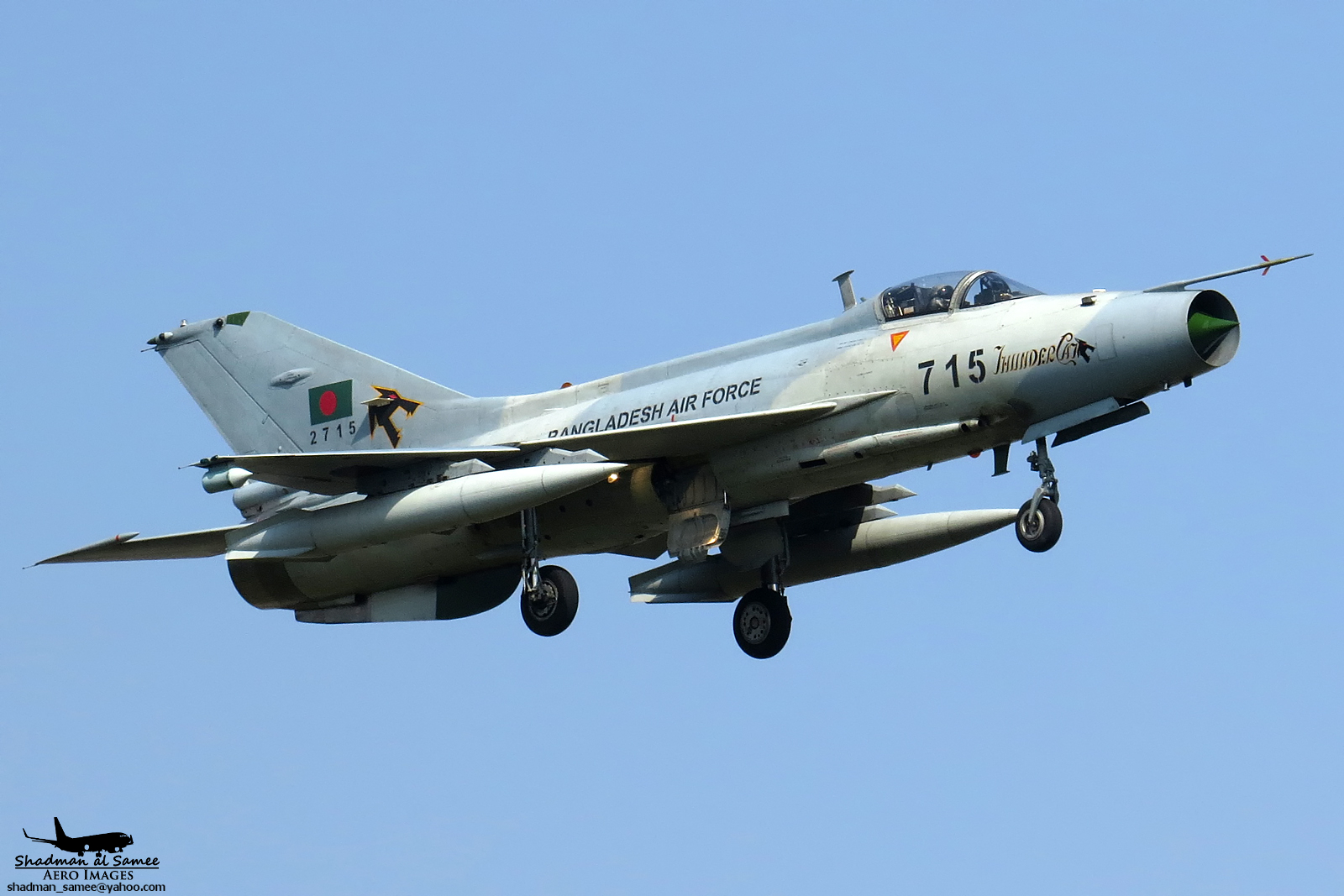
BAF Chengdu F-7BG

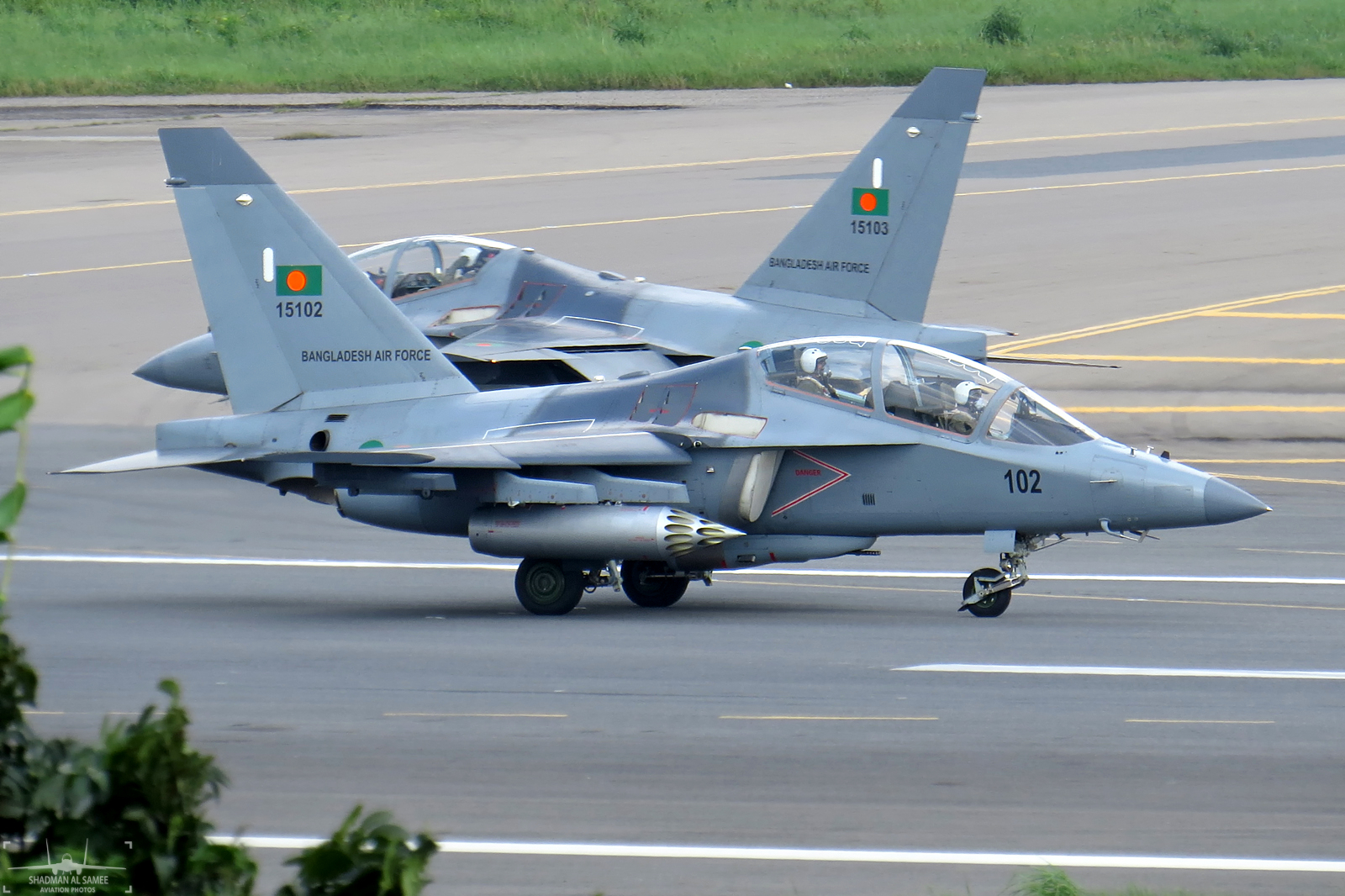
BAF Yak-130.

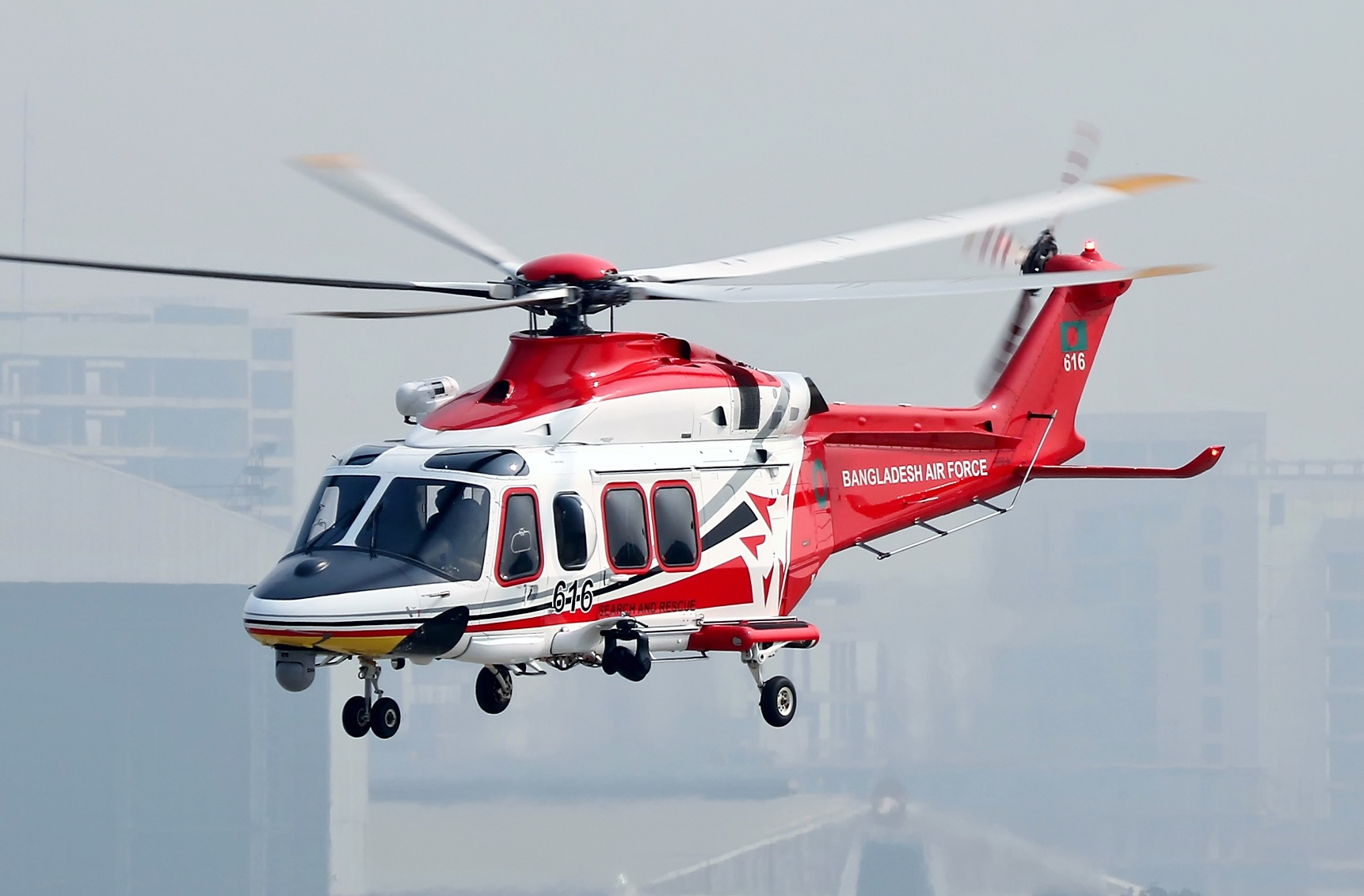
A BAF AW139 Maritime search and rescue helicopter.

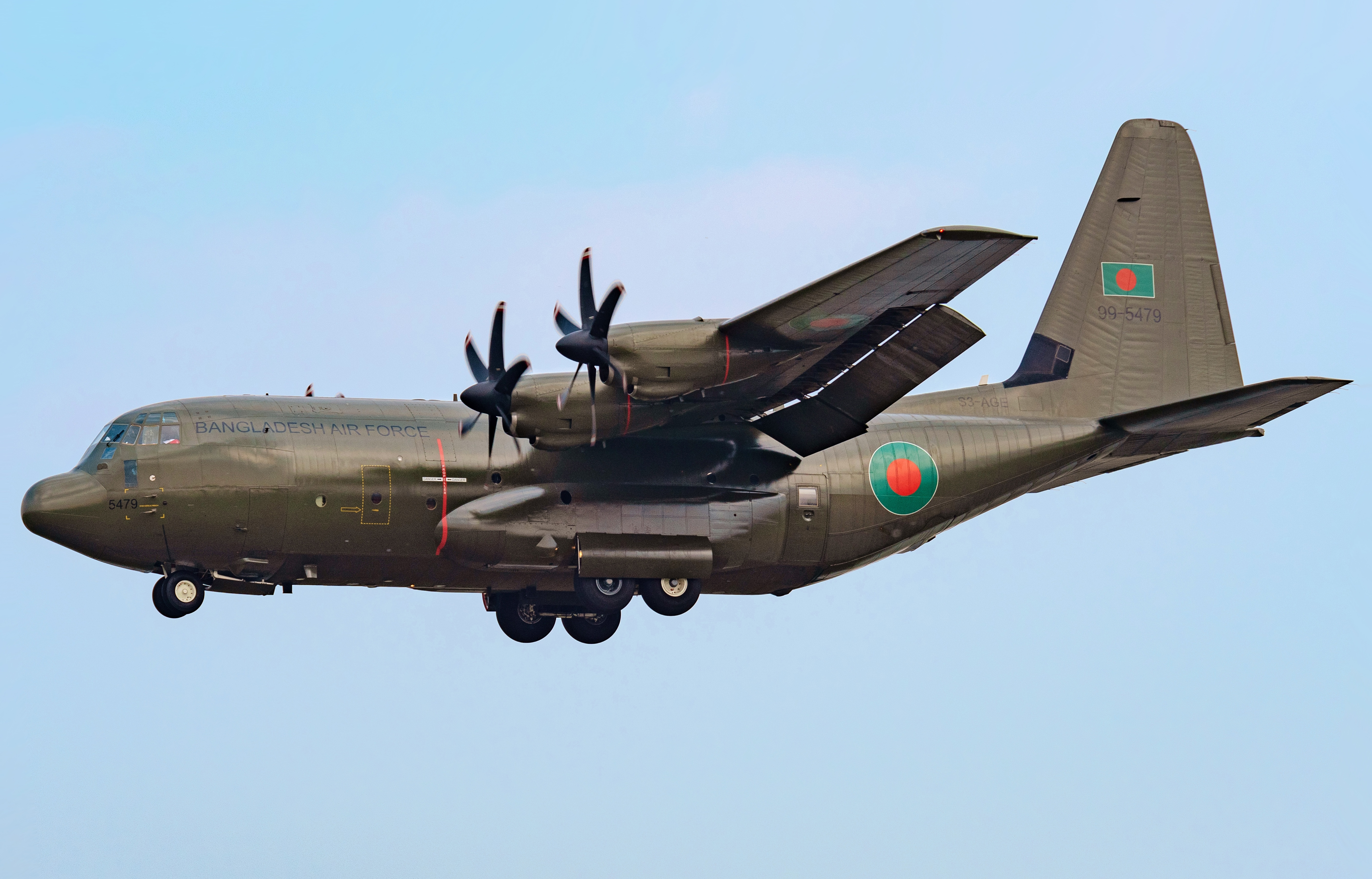
BAF Lockheed C-130J Super Hercules.

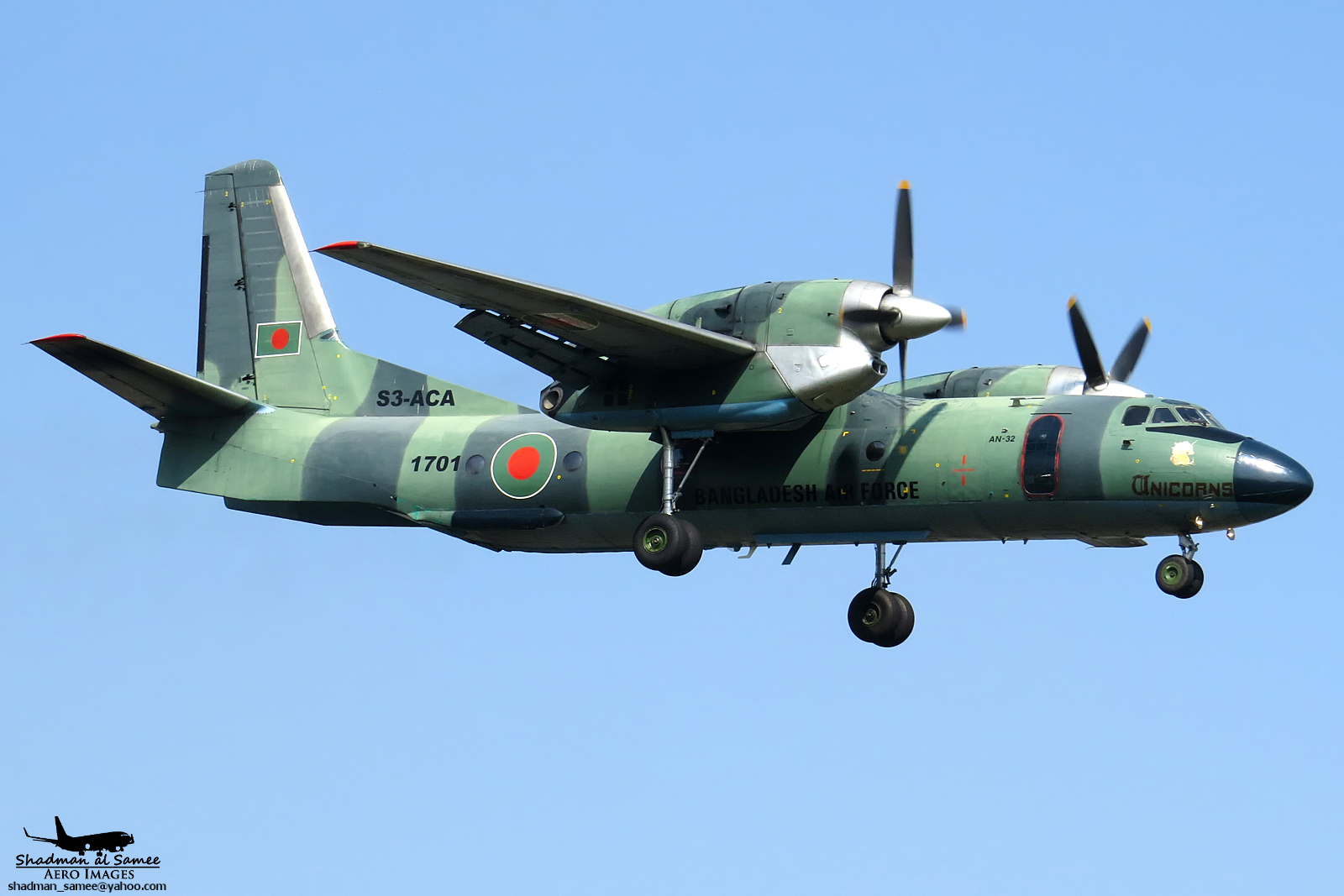
BAF Antonov An-32.

Aircraft	Origin	Type	Variant	In service	Notes
Combat aircraft (43)
Mikoyan MiG-29	Russia	Multirole Fighter	MiG-29BM/UBM	8	Upgraded via Belarus (558 ARZ) with digital cockpit, radar overhauls and R-77 BVR missile integration.
Chengdu F-7	China	Fighter/Interceptor	F-7BG/BGI	~32	Legacy aircraft serving as point-defence interceptors. Scheduled for long-term retirement as newer generation fighters arrive.
Yakovlev Yak-130	Russia	Attack	Yak-130	12	Ground attack & Advanced lead-in fighter trainer (LIFT). 4 frames previously lost to historical training accidents.
Chengdu J-10	China	Multirole Fighter	J-10CE	0 (20–24 on order)	Draft agreement finalized as of mid-2026 for a $2.2 billion fleet acquisition plan.
Eurofighter Typhoon	Italy	Multirole Fighter	Tranche 4	12	The Bangladesh Air Force (BAF) has signed a Letter of Intent (LOI) with Leonardo S.p.A of Italy to procure Eurofighter Typhoon multi-role combat aircraft.
JF-17 Thunder	Pakistan, China	Multirole Fighter	Block 4	16	Under negotiation, one JF-17 simulator has been installed at a Bangladesh Air Force (BAF) base. Bangladeshi pilots have also received training on the JF-17.
Transport (14)
Lockheed Martin C-130J Super Hercules	United States	Tactical Airlifter	C-130J (C5)	5	Ex-UK Royal Air Force's airframes. Marshall Aerospace completed delivery of the 5th and final unit.
Lockheed C-130 Hercules	United States	Tactical Transport	C-130B	3	Legacy transport variants remaining in active rotation.
Antonov An-32	Ukraine	Tactical Transport	An-32B	3	Extensively used for domestic cargo movement and logistics.
LET L-410 Turbolet	Czech Republic	Light Utility Transport	L-410UVP-E20	3	Twin-engine short-range transport aircraft.
Helicopters (53)
Mil Mi-17	Russia	Utility/Transport/Assault	Mi-17/171/171Sh	35	Serves heavily in UN Peacekeeping duties and domestic disaster relief.
Bell UH-1N Twin Huey	United States	Utility Helicopter	Twin Huey	14	Fully operational in search and rescue and utility roles.
AgustaWestland AW139	Italy	SAR	AW139	4	Equipped primarily for maritime search, rescue and utility ops.
T-129 ATAK	Turkey	Attack helicopter	T129B	6	Ordered 6 T-129 ATAK helicopters from Turkey in 2025, with estimated deliveries by 2027.
Trainer aircraft (96)
Grob G 115	Germany	Basic Trainer	G 115EG	2	Used selectively for grading new flight recruits.
Nanchang CJ-6	China	Basic Trainer	PT-6A	24	Primary piston-engine trainer aircraft.
Grob G 120	Germany	Basic Trainer	G 120TP	24	Serves as the primary elementary flight training platform.
Hongdu JL-8	China	Jet Trainer/Light Attack	K-8W	15	Intermediate jet trainer with secondary light-attack capability
Yakovlev Yak-130	Russia	Advanced Jet Trainer	Yak-130	12	Advanced lead-in fighter trainer (LIFT). (4 frames previously lost to historical training accidents.)
Chengdu FT-7	China	Conversion Trainer	FT-7MB/BG	11	Twin-seat training variant of the F-7 fighter.
Bell 206	United States	Helicopter Trainer	206L	6	Light turbine helicopter used for initial rotary-wing training.
AgustaWestland AW119	Italy	Helicopter Trainer	AW119kx	2	Modern rotary flight training platform.
Reconnaissance and Surveillance UAVs (2)
Selex ES Falco	Italy	Tactical Reconnaissance UAV	Falco	2 (Unconfirmed Status)	Historically deployed for UN peacekeeping missions (MINUSMA). The BAF strictly keeps structural operations classified, so flight readiness rates are unconfirmed by international registries.
Selex ES Falco EVO	Italy	Reconnaissance UAV/UCAV	EVO	2	Falco EVO, armed variant of the ES Falco. EVO is capable of firing Turkish-made Roketsan Cirit laser-guided rockets.
Selex ES Falco Astore	Italy	Reconnaissance UAV/UCAV	Astore	2-3	Falco Astore, armed variant of the ES Falco. EVO is capable of firing Turkish-made Roketsan Cirit laser-guided rockets.

== Bangladesh Army ==
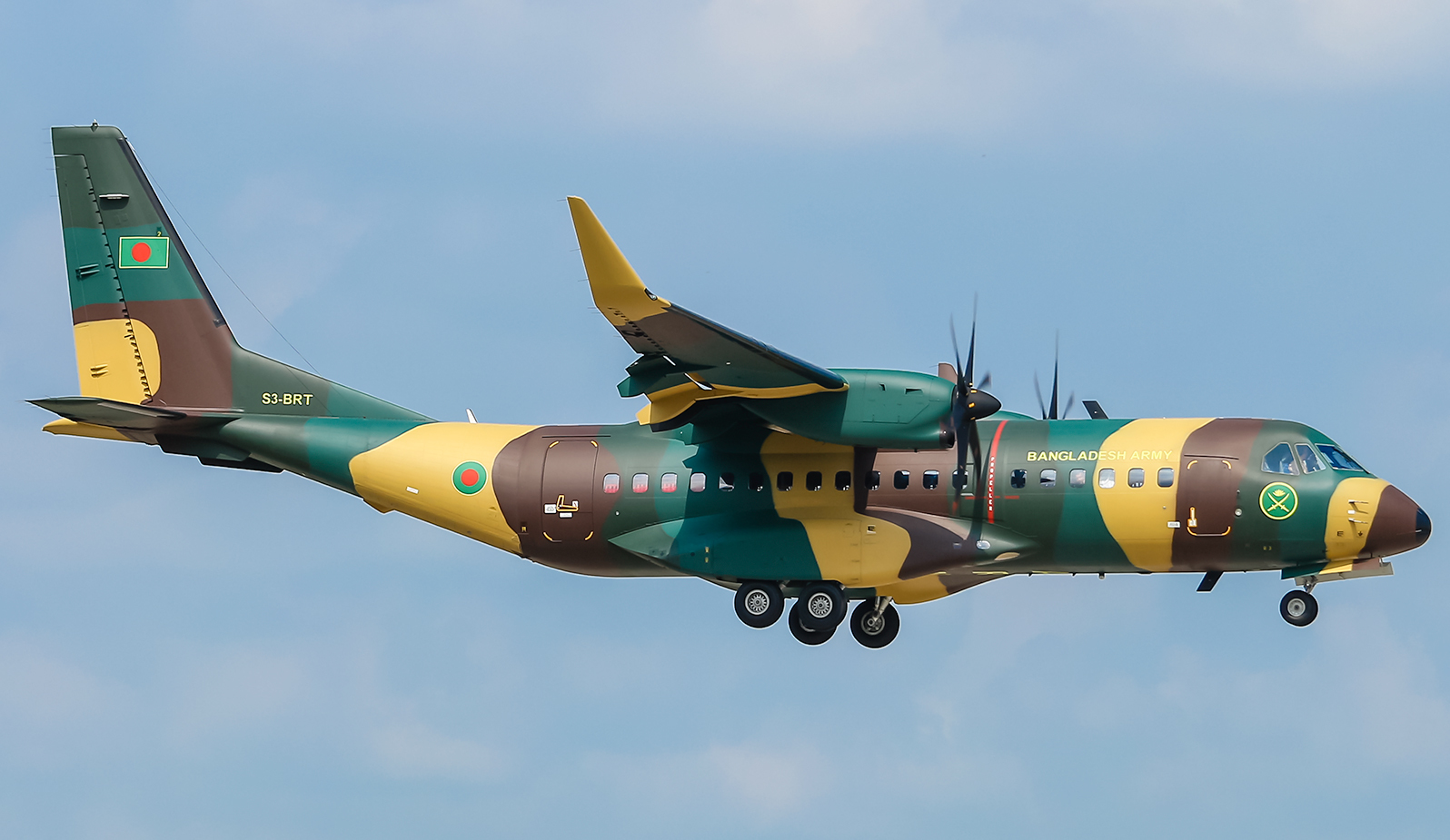
A Bangladesh Army CN-295W

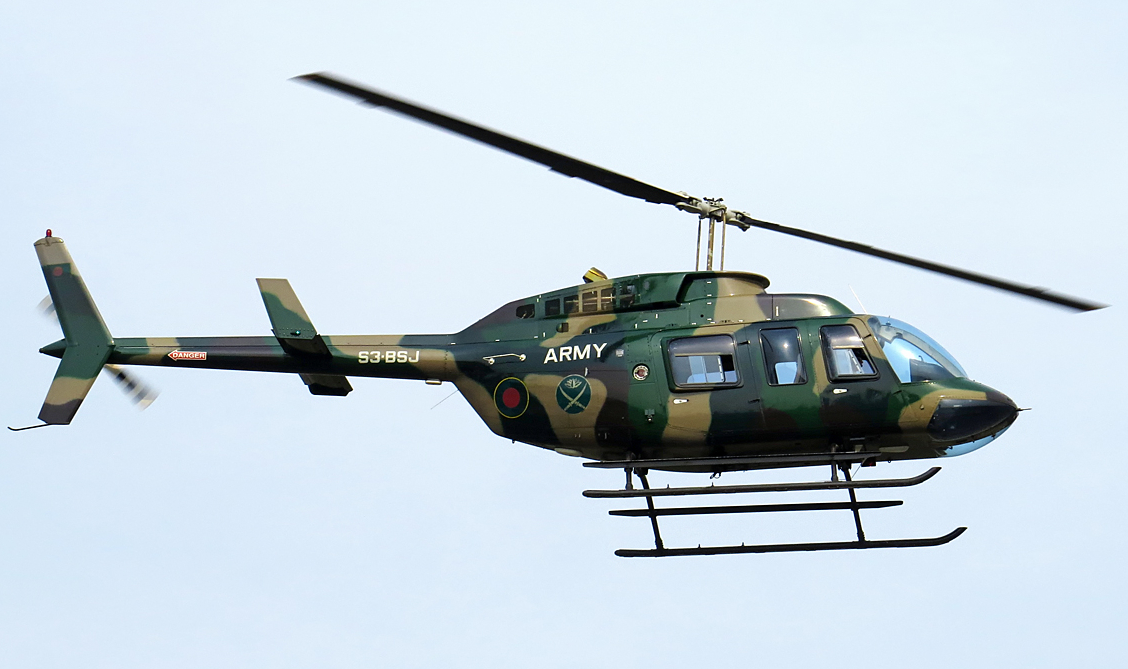
Bangladesh Army Aviation Bell 206-L4 LongRanger

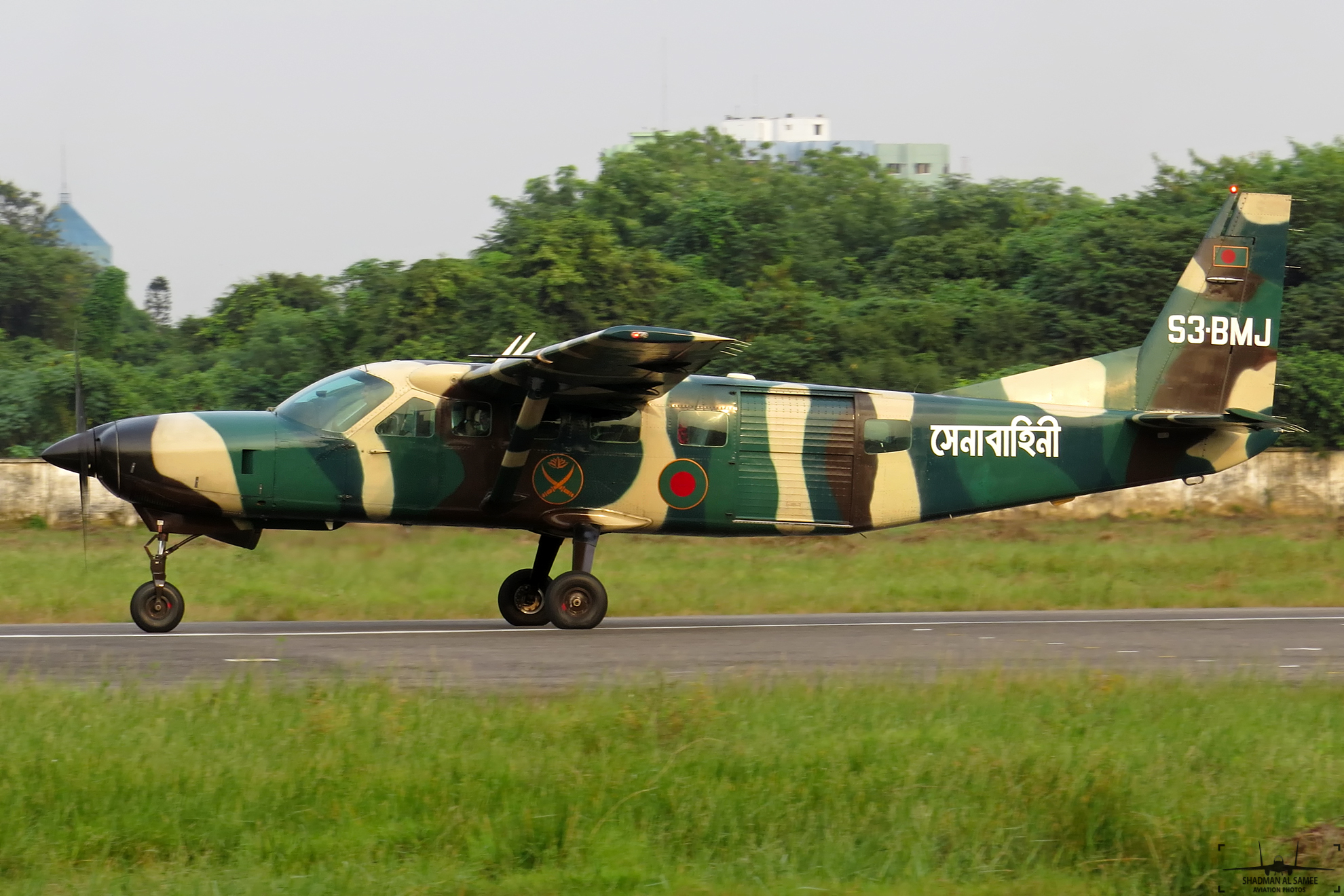
Bangladesh Army Cessna 206

Aircraft	Origin	Type	Variant	In service	Notes
Fixed wing (12)
Cessna 208	United States	Transport / Utility		1	
Cessna 152 Aerobat	United States	Light Aircraft		5	A152 Aerobat variant.
CASA C-295	Spain	Transport	C-295W	2	
Diamond DA40	Austria	Training		4	
Helicopters (10)
Bell 206	United States	Training	206L	1	
Bell 407	United States	Training/Transport	407GXi	4	
Mil Mi-17	Russia	Transport/Assault	Mi-171Sh	5-6	
Eurocopter AS365	France	Transport		2	
Sikorsky UH-60 Black Hawk	United States	Electronic Warfare/Transport/Assault	EH-60 Black Hawk	4-6	Bangladesh Army is set to acquire four UH-60L Black Hawk helicopters as part of its military modernization efforts. This acquisition is part of the "Forces Goal 2030" modernization plan, which aims to enhance the nation's defense infrastructure and operational capabilities.
Unmanned aerial vehicle
Baykar Bayraktar TB2	Turkey	UCAV	Attack	6	
Bramor C4EYE	Slovenia	Reconnaissance UAV	Bramor C4EYE	36	
RQ-12B Wasp AE	United States	Miniature UAV	RQ-12B		on order

== Bangladesh Navy ==
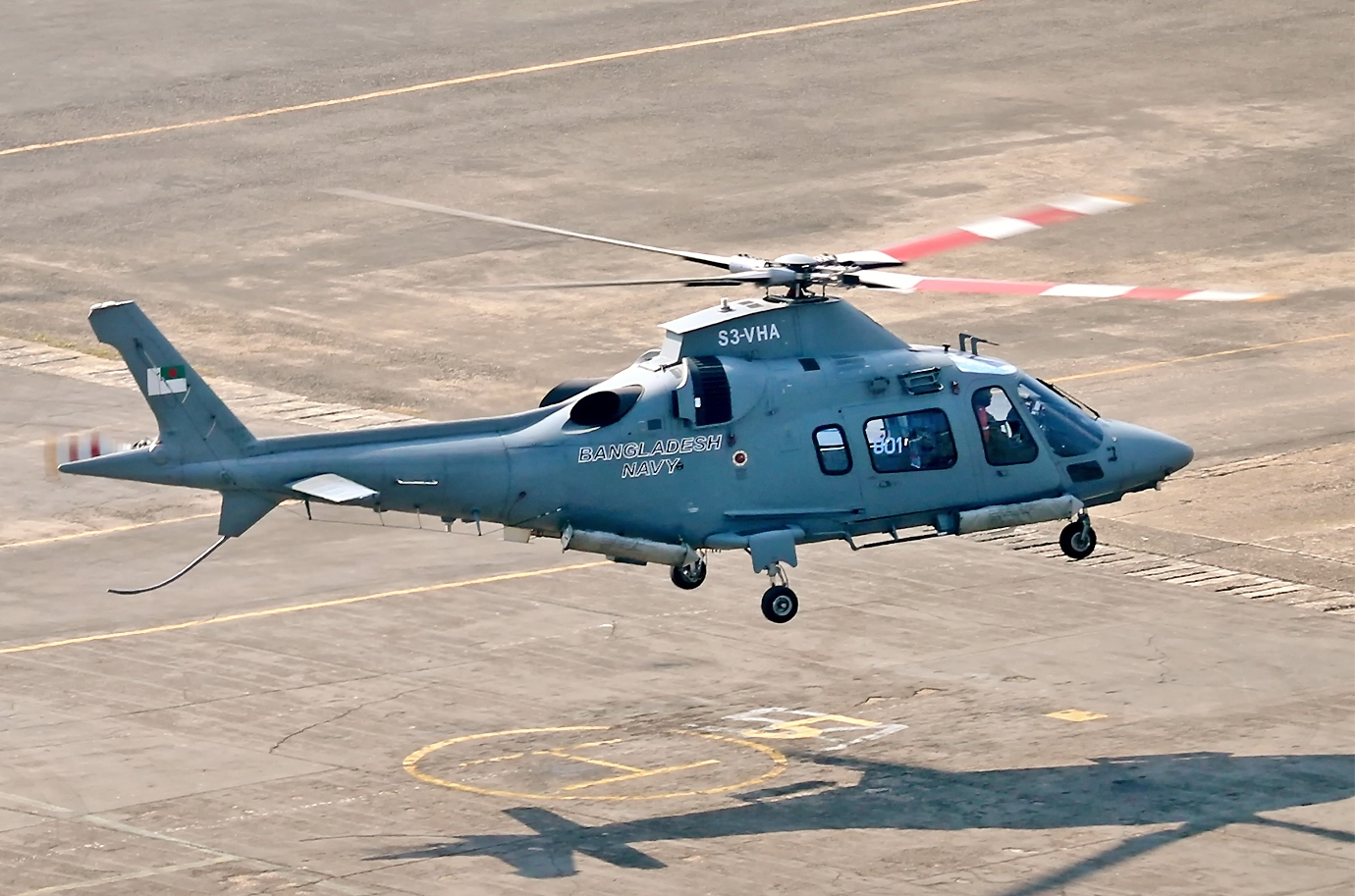
An AW109 helicopter of Bangladesh Navy

Aircraft	Origin	Type	Variant	In service	Notes
Maritime patrol (4)
Dornier 228	Germany	Patrol / Surveillance	228NG	4	
Helicopters (4)
AgustaWestland AW109	Italy	Utility / SAR	AW109E Power	4	

== See also ==
- List of historic Bangladesh military aircraft
- Bangabandhu Aeronautical Centre
