= Selex ES Falco =

Family of Italian-designed military drones

Falco / Falco EVO / Astore
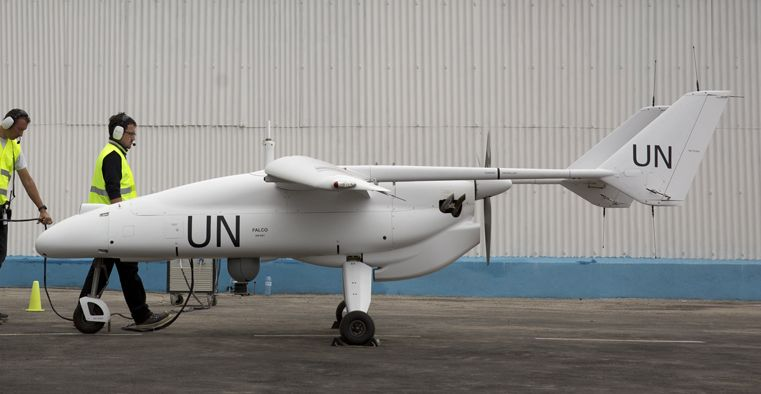
- A Falco UAV in DR Congo as part of MONUSCO peacekeeping mission

General information
- Type: Falco and Falco EVO: Unmanned surveillance and reconnaissance aerial vehicle; Astore: Tactical unmanned combat aerial vehicle
- National origin: Italy
- Manufacturer: Selex ES; Pakistan Aeronautical Complex (since 2008); Leonardo; Leonardo-Finmeccanica (since 2016)
- Designer: Galileo Avionica
- Primary user: Pakistan Air Force; Royal Saudi Air Force; Bangladesh Air Force
- Number built: ~50 production aircraft

History
- Introduction date: Falco: 2009
- First flight: Falco: December 2003; Falco EVO : 2012

The Falco (Italian for 'hawk') is a family of tactical unmanned aerial vehicles designed and produced by Selex ES (now Leonardo formerly Leonardo-Finmeccanica and Finmeccanica, originally by Galileo Avionica of Italy). The Falco family UAVs are designed to be a medium-altitude, medium-endurance intelligence, surveillance, target acquisition, and reconnaissance (ISTAR) capable platform equipped with range of payloads, including several types of high-resolution sensors. A larger variant, the Falco EVO, is capable of carrying larger payloads is also available. Neither system is designed to carry weapons, The launch customer, Pakistan, reportedly wanted the Falco armed, a request that Italy rejected. Astore is an armed version developed from the Falco EVO equipped with two Turkish made Roketsan Cirit 70 mm laser-guided missiles along with the ISTAR capability. As of 2026, the Bangladesh Air Force is the only confirmed user of the armed Falco family UAVs.

== Development ==
- The Falco UAV's maiden flight took place in December 2003 and Galileo Avionica had completed platform qualification in late October 2004. Over 40 hours of flight-testing had been completed by then at the Salto di Quirra test range in Sardinia. Validation of flight controls had been completed in September 2004. Testing of the onboard systems was planned to be started in early 2005 and integration of the electro-optical sensor suite planned for July 2005. Radar installation was scheduled to begin in 2006.
- In January 2007 it was reported that Galileo Avionica had finished factory acceptance tests and was ready to deliver the first production Falco UAV System to its launch customer, then believed to be Pakistan. The production version of the Falco UAV used a modified powerplant developing 80 hp (60 kW), supplied by UAV Engines.
- In March 2009 it was reported that a modified version named Falco Evo, evo meaning evolution, was being offered. It features larger tail booms and wings which almost double wingspan to 12.5 m and increase payload from 70 kg to 100 kg. The Falco Evo's first flight was expected to take place by mid-2010.
- At the time Selex ES officials refused to identify the customer, but it was known that Pakistan had ordered 5 systems, including a total of 25 Falco UAVs with spare flight units and ground control stations (GCS). Two systems were in service by March 2009, two more had been delivered and the final assembly of the last system was being undertaken in Pakistan.
- In August 2009 it was reported that the Falco UAV had completed flight-tests while being launched by a catapult launch system, the Robonic MC2555LLR pneumatic launcher. Pakistan started manufacturing the Falco UAV at Pakistan Aeronautical Complex (PAC), Kamra
- Around September 2009 the first flight of a Falco UAV carrying a high resolution AESA synthetic aperture radar (SAR) sensor payload, called PicoSAR, was made.
- SELEX Galileo, now Selex ES, announced on 23 July 2012 that the Falcon Evo had successfully completed its 40-minute maiden flight from Cheshnegirovo air base in Bulgaria.
- In August 2013, the Selex ES Falco was chosen by United Nations to be deployed in the Democratic Republic of Congo to monitor movements of armed groups in the region and to protect the civilian population more effectively.
- In September 2013, Selex ES has announced a deal worth over 40 million Euros (US$52 million) to sell its Falco UAV to an unnamed Middle Eastern country
- In June 2023, the Falco was shown at the Paris Air Show fitted with a Brimstone (missile)

== Design ==
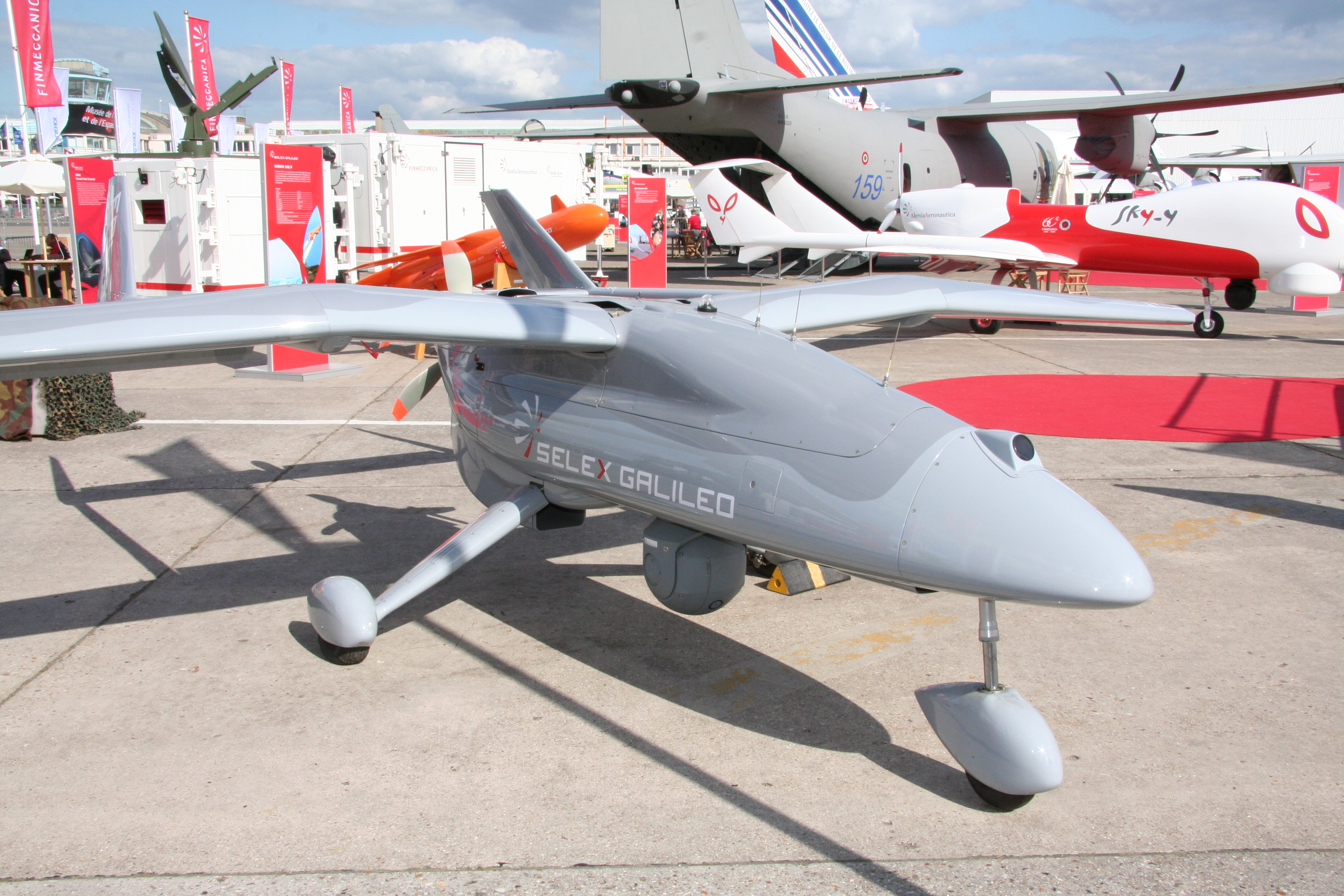
Selex ES Falco at Paris Air Show 2009

The Falco UAV System comprises:

- Ground Control Station (GCS)
- Ground Data Terminal (GDT)
- Ground Support Equipment (GSE)
- 4 Falco UAVs housing payloads specified by the user

The Falco UAV is 17 feet (5.2 m) long, 6 feet (1.8 m) high, has a 24-foot (7.3 m) wingspan and a top speed of 134 mph (216 km/h). A maximum altitude of around 16,400 feet (5,000 m) and endurance of up to 14 hours can be attained. As well as providing the Falco air vehicle, Selex ES offers a range of sensors, including EOST 46 electro-optical/infrared turret, Gabbiano 20 multi-mode surveillance radar and the PicoSAR radar. The latter is a compact, active "e-scan" radar providing synthetic aperture radar imagery and ground moving target indication. When used in conjunction with change detection software, the PicoSAR can be a powerful counter-IED tool. The Falco can also carry the SAGE electronic warfare suite for accurate direction-finding, classification and geo-location of emitters.

The Falco EVO System has a payload capacity of up to 100 kg and an extended endurance of up to 18 hours.

== Operational history ==
=== Pakistan ===
It has been deployed by Pakistan's military, after the purchase of 24 planes, to the Swat Valley, and a partnership is planned between Selex Galileo partner and the Pakistan Aeronautical Complex, a state-owned defense manufacturer, to produce the Falco in Pakistan. The Falco does not carry armaments and has no strike capability. The U.S. has refused to sell Pakistan its more advanced UAVs over concerns about "sensitive data". The word Falco means hawk in Italian.

- The Pakistani unarmed Falco UAVs are believed to have been used during the country's 2009 security operations in the Swat Valley for locating "all kinds of targets," including "ammunition dumps, bunkers, hide-outs, pickets" and other types of infrastructure used by the insurgency.
- A locally-built drone crash-landed at Base near Chak 96 Sargodha. The aircraft suffered minor damages and no one was injured on the ground.

=== Jordan ===
On 15 and 16 June 2017 two Selex Falco operated by Jordan were shot down in the vicinity of the town of Daraa by Syrian MiG-23 fighters with R-24R missiles.

== Operators ==
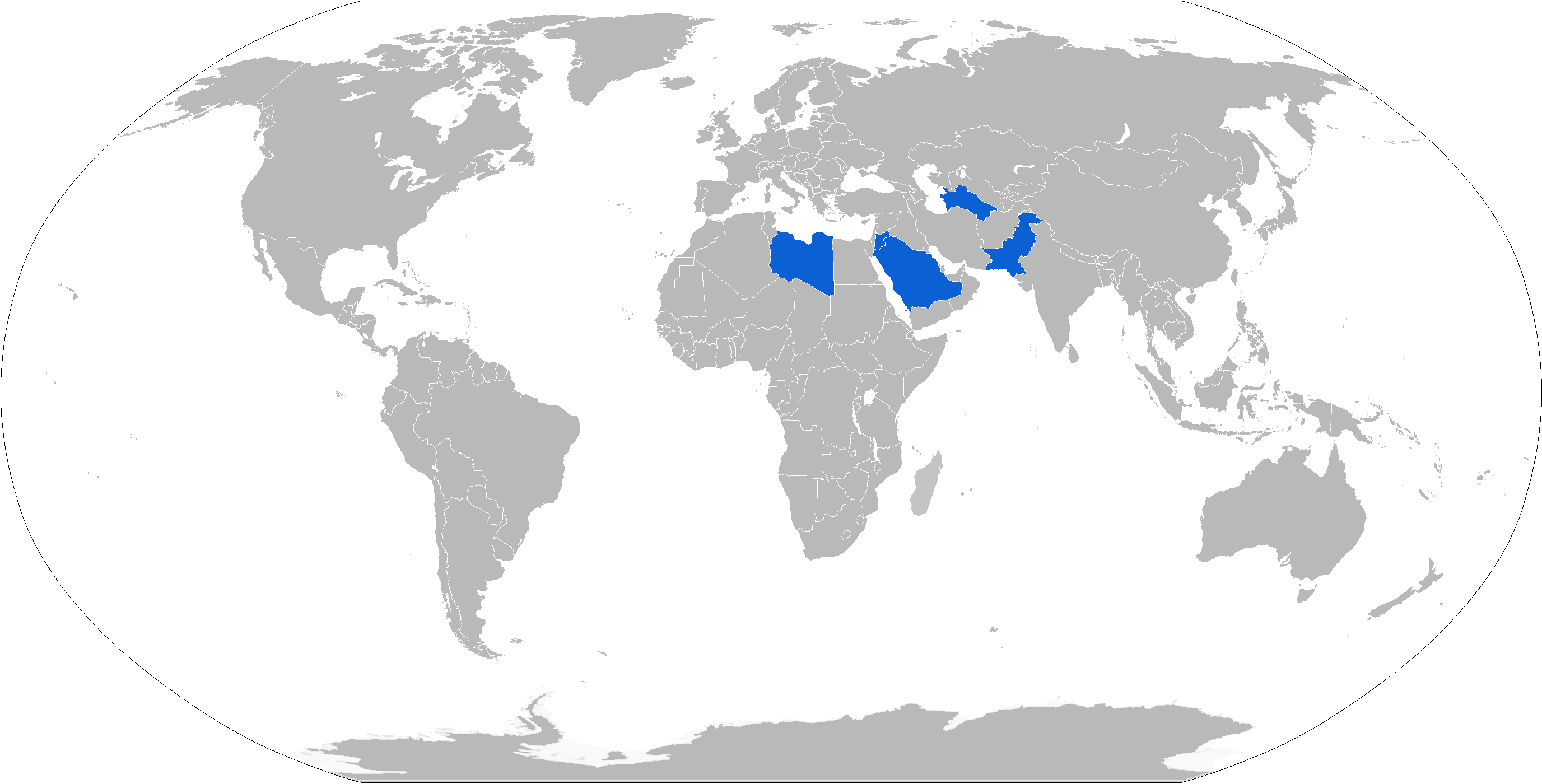
World operators of the Falco and Falco Evo

Elbit of Israel has ordered the Selex ES Gabbiano radar for the Hermes 450 and 900 UAVs, for long-range surveillance cover over land or sea, with applications including synthetic aperture radar (SAR) and inverse SAR imagery modes. Selex ES has not commented on operators but the Falco has been reported as being acquired by the following countries:

Bangladesh

- Bangladesh Air Force: In March 2019, UN Provide Bangladesh Air force gets 3 Falco EVO. After 2 years Air force integrate 2/3 Falco Family UAVs including Astore (each are armed with two Roketsan Cirit missiles).

Libya

- In July 2009 according to the French research agency ADIT a deal for a sale of Falco UAVs was awaiting Italian government approval.

Jordan

- In November 2009 the Jordanian Armed Forces awarded a contract to SELEX Galileo to develop indigenous UAV technologies and electro-optic sensors for Jordan special operations forces based on the company's Falco tactical unmanned aerial system (TUAS).

Pakistan

- Pakistan became the first Falco export customer in 2007 and started manufacturing the Falco under license at the Pakistan Aeronautical Complex (PAC) in 2008.

Saudi Arabia

- On 13 July 2012 ainonline.com reported a new sale for the Falco, bringing the number of export customers to four, and that more than 50 air vehicles were operational at the time.

Turkmenistan

- 3 Falco XN in 2011 for €8,7 million

United Nations

- The United Nation Peacekeeping force has started using the Falco UAV in places such as war-torn DR Congo since 3 December 2013. According to Allen Mcduffee of Wired.com's dangerroom, "the United Nations has turned to spy drones for the first time in its history in an effort to increase pressure in militias in the Democratic Republic of the Congo, marking both a major technological advancement in the organization’s peacekeeping arsenal as well as a shift in how it views the use of unmanned aerial vehicles". A service contract to operate 5 "Falco" drones (price about €50million) was signed at the end of July between Selex ES and the United Nations

== Specifications ==
=== Falco EVO and Astore ===
Data from Leonardo
General characteristics

- Capacity: 100 kg (331 lb)
- Length: 6.2 m
- Wingspan: 12.5 m
- Height: 2.5 m
- Max takeoff weight: 650 kg
- Powerplant: 1 × Heavy fuel engine
- Maximum speed: 134 mph
- Service ceiling:
  - Falco EVO: 6,000 m
  - Astore: >7,000 m
- Endurance:
  - Falco EVO: >20 hr to >24 hr
  - Astore: >16 hr
- Hardpoints: 2 × under-wing hardpoints for total 2 Roketsan Cirit missiles (Astore)
- Avionics
  - Communications: Jamming-resistant data-link, real time data transmission, range >200 km
  - Mission payloads:
    - High resolution cameras: thermal imaging, hyperspectral imaging, colour TV, EO
    - Radars: Synthetic aperture radar, maritime surveillance radar
    - Targeting: Laser designator
    - Others: Electronic support measures equipment, NBC sensors, self-protection equipment (chaff / flare dispensers)

=== Falco ===
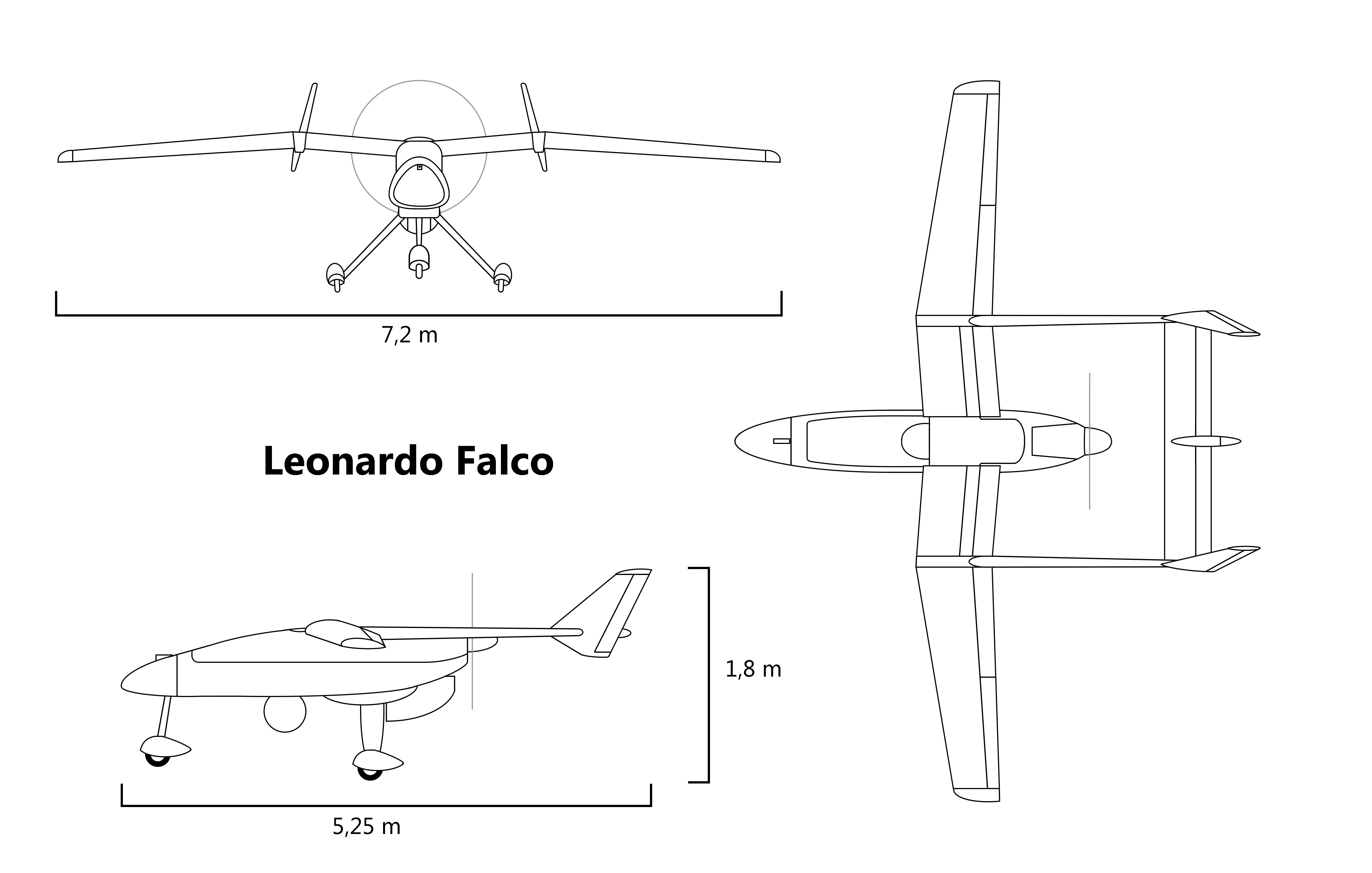
Drawing lines

Data from Leonardo, Flightglobal

General characteristics

- Capacity: 70 kg (331 lb)
- Length: 5.25 m (17 ft 2 in)
- Wingspan: 7.2 m (23 ft 7 in)
- Height: 1.8 m (5 ft 11 in)
- Max takeoff weight: 420 kg (926 lb)
- Powerplant: 1 × Gasoline engine , 48 kW (65 hp)

Performance

- Maximum speed: 216 km/h (134 mph, 116 kn)
- Cruise speed: 160 km/h (99 mph, 90 kn)
- Endurance: 8-14 hr
- Service ceiling: 5,000 m (21,325 ft)

Avionics

- Communications: Jamming-resistant data-link, real time data transmission, range 200 km (extendable with GCS handover or relay capability)
- Mission payloads:
  - High resolution cameras: 10-inch electro-optical sensor (thermal imaging, hyperspectral imaging, colour TV, EO)
  - Radars: Synthetic aperture radar, maritime surveillance radar
  - Targeting: Laser designator
  - Others: Electronic support measures equipment, NBC sensors, self-protection equipment (chaff / flare dispensers)

== See also ==
- List of unmanned aerial vehicles
- Twin-boom aircraft
