= List of historic aircraft of the People's Liberation Army Air Force =

This is a list of aircraft no-longer in service with the People's Liberation Army Air Force (PLAAF).

== Domestic built aircraft ==
Aircraft type	National origin	Year		Notes
Aircraft type	National origin	In service	Retired	Notes
Chengdu J-7	China	1966	2023	Fighter
Harbin Z-5	China	1959	Unknown	Helicopter
Nanchang CJ-5	China	1954	2001	Trainer
Shenyang J-2	China	1950	1986	Fighter
Shenyang J-5	China	1956	1992	Fighter
Shenyang J-6	China	1962	2010	Fighter
Shenyang J-8	China	1980	2011	Fighter
Nanchang Q-5	China	1965	2017	Attacker
Harbin H-5	China	1965	2011	Bomber

== Foreign origin aircraft ==
Aircraft type	National origin	Year		Notes
Aircraft type	National origin	In service	Retired	Notes
Aero L-29 Delfin	Czechoslovakia	1966	1988	Trainer
Aichi E13A	Japan	1945	?	Captured Japanese floatplane
Antonov An-2	USSR	1950	1981	Transport locally built version in use
Beriev Be-6	USSR	1955	2001	Maritime patrol seaplane
Consolidated B-24 Liberator	United States	1946	1949	Captured bomber
Curtiss C-46 Commando	United States	1949	1985	Captured Nationalist transport
de Havilland Mosquito	United Kingdom	1949	1951	Captured Nationalist bomber
Ilyushin Il-10	USSR	1949	1972	Ground attack aircraft
Ilyushin Il-12	USSR	1950	1998	Transport aircraft
Ilyushin Il-14	USSR	1955	1998	Transport aircraft
Ilyushin Il-28	USSR	1952	1997	Jet bomber
Kawasaki Ki-45	Japan	1945	1946	Captured Japanese heavy fighter
Kawasaki Ki-48	Japan	1945	1949	Captured Japanese medium bomber
Kawasaki Ki-61	Japan	1945	1949	Captured Japanese fighter
Lavochkin La-7	USSR	1950	1958	Fighter
Lavochkin La-9	USSR	1949	1959	Fighter
Lavochkin La-11	USSR	1949	1964	Fighter
Lisunov Li-2	USSR	1949	2001	Transport aircraft, Soviet licensed DC-3
Mansyu Ki-79	Japan	1945	1946	Captured Japanese trainer
Mikoyan-Gurevich MiG-9	USSR	1950	1956	Jet fighter
Mikoyan-Gurevich MiG-15	USSR	1950	1987	Fighter
Mil Mi-1	USSR	1950	1991	Transport helicopter
Mitsubishi Ki-51	Japan	1945	1949	Captured Japanese light bomber
Nakajima Ki-43	Japan	1945	1949	Captured Japanese fighter
North American B-25 Mitchell	United States	1948	1960s	Captured Nationalist medium bomber
North American P-51 Mustang	United States	1949	1955	Captured Nationalist fighter
North American T-6 Texan	United States	1949	1950	Captured Nationalist trainer
Petlyakov Pe-2	USSR	1949	1957	Light/dive bomber
Polikarpov Po-2	USSR	1949	1968	Utility biplane/trainer
Republic P-47 Thunderbolt	United States	1949	1950	Captured Nationalist fighter
Stearman PT-17	United States	1949	1968	Captured Nationalist trainer
Tachikawa Ki-55	Japan	1945	1953	Captured Japanese trainer
Tupolev SB	USSR	1937	1938	Medium bomber
Tupolev Tu-2	USSR	1950	1982	Medium bomber
Tupolev Tu-4	USSR	1951	1997	Heavy bomber, copy of Boeing B-29 Superfortress
Tupolev Tu-14	USSR	1957	1960s	Torpedo bomber
Tupolev Tu-16	USSR	1959	1985	Heavy bomber, Chinese variant in service
Tupolev Tu-124	USSR	1980	1994	Airliner
Vickers Viscount	United Kingdom	1967	1986	Turboprop airliner
Yakovlev Yak-9	USSR	1949	1957	Fighter
Yakovlev Yak-11	USSR	1949	1983	Advanced trainer
Yakovlev Yak-12	USSR	1949	1973	Light utility transport
Yakovlev Yak-17	USSR	1950	1952	Jet fighter
Yakovlev Yak-18	USSR	1949	1992	Primary trainer, Chinese variant in service

== See also ==
- People's Liberation Army
