= List of military aircraft of the United Kingdom =

This is a list of all aircraft ever used by the United Kingdom. It consists of lists of what aircraft were in service for the UK at certain periods of time and by military force.

== List of Army Air Corps aircraft ==
- List of aircraft of the Army Air Corps (United Kingdom)

== Aircraft of the Royal Flying Corps ==
- List of aircraft of the Royal Flying Corps

== Aircraft of the Royal Air Force ==
- List of aircraft of the Royal Air Force

== Aircraft of Royal Navy ==
- List of naval aircraft of the United Kingdom
- List of aircraft of the Royal Naval Air Service
- List of aircraft of the Fleet Air Arm

== World War II ==
- List of aircraft of the United Kingdom in World War II

== Modern day ==
- List of active United Kingdom military aircraft

== Gallery of the progression of British fighters ==
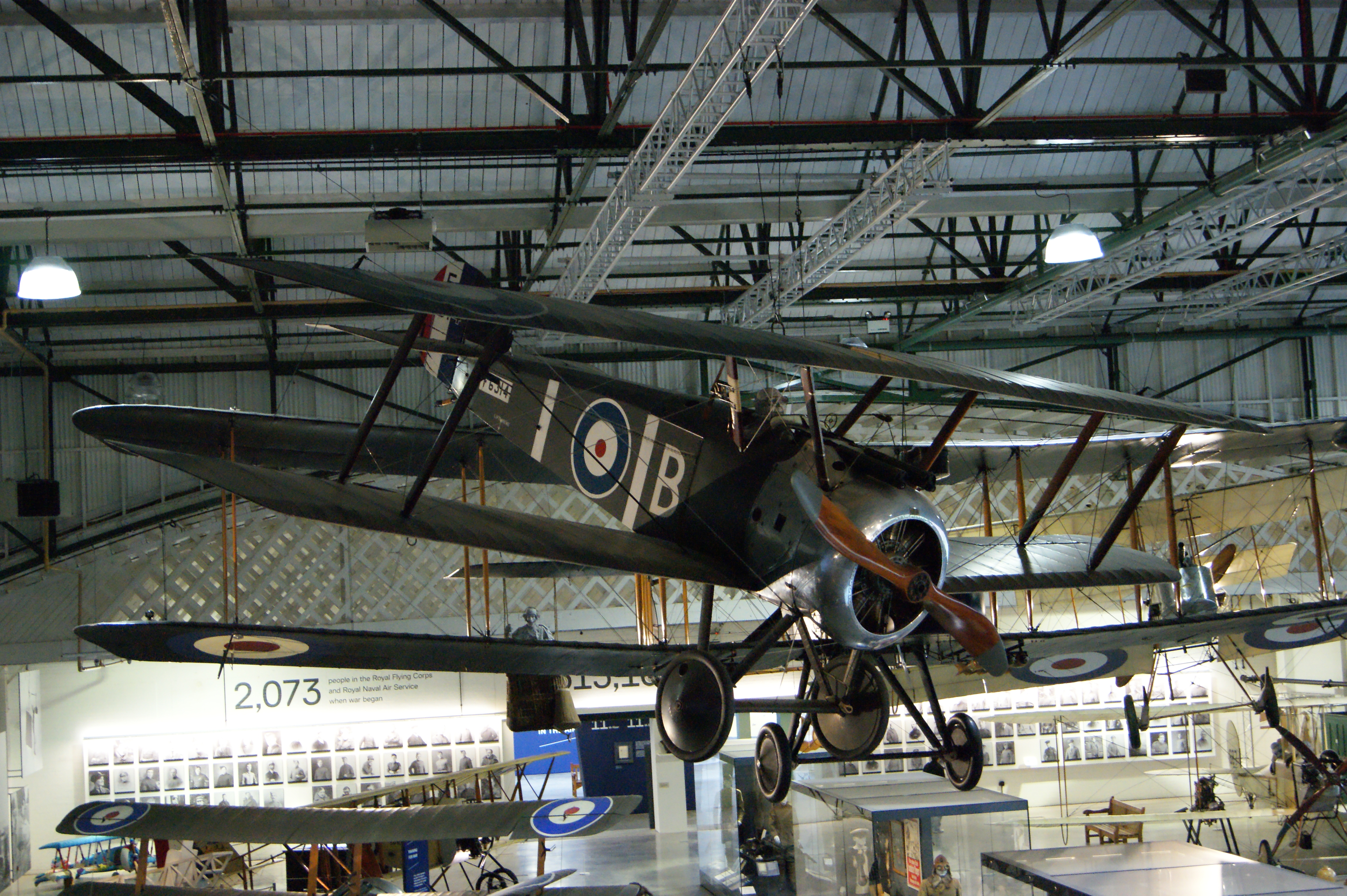
A Sopwith Camel that saw widespread service late in World War I.

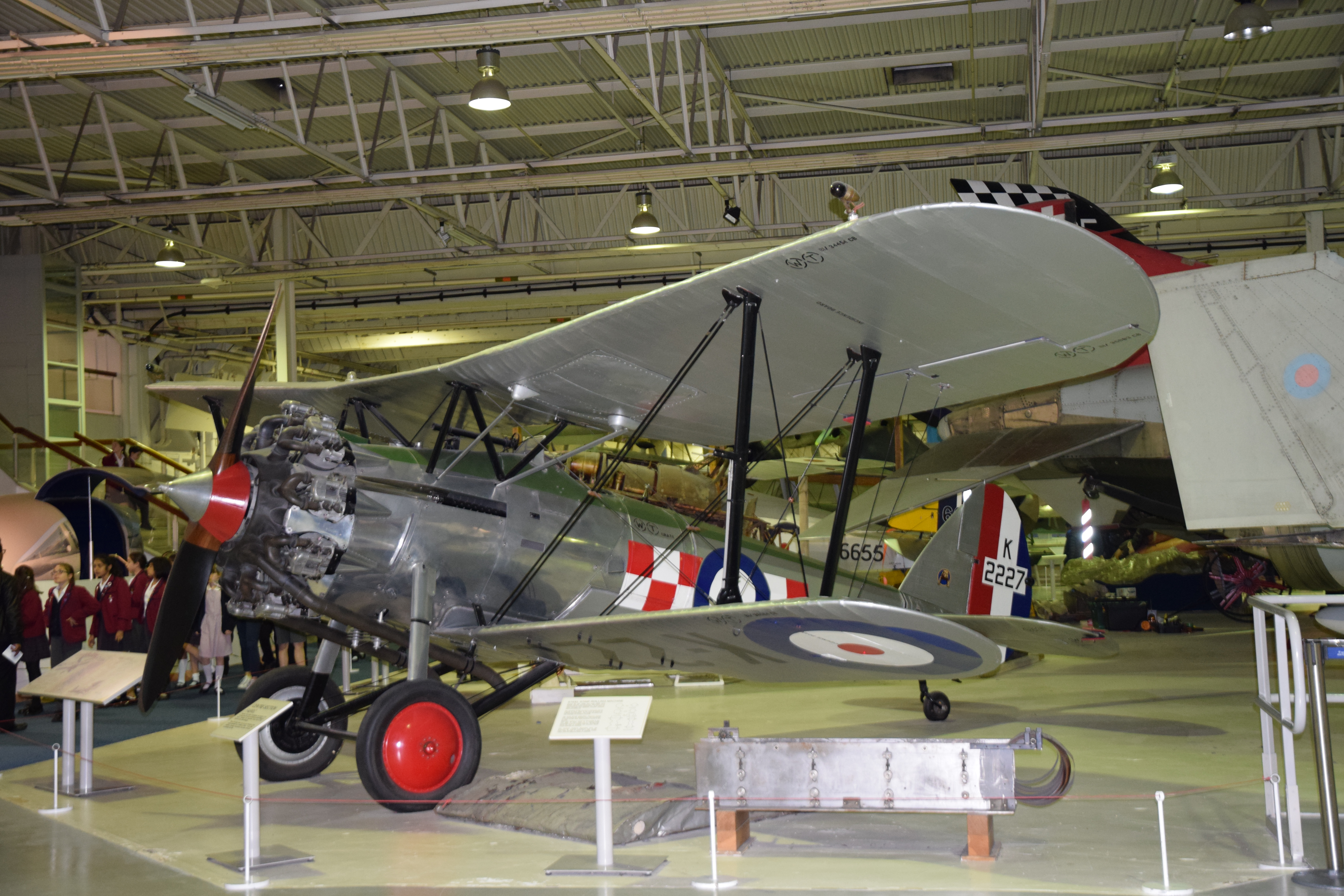
A Bristol Bulldog the primary British fighter in the Interwar period.

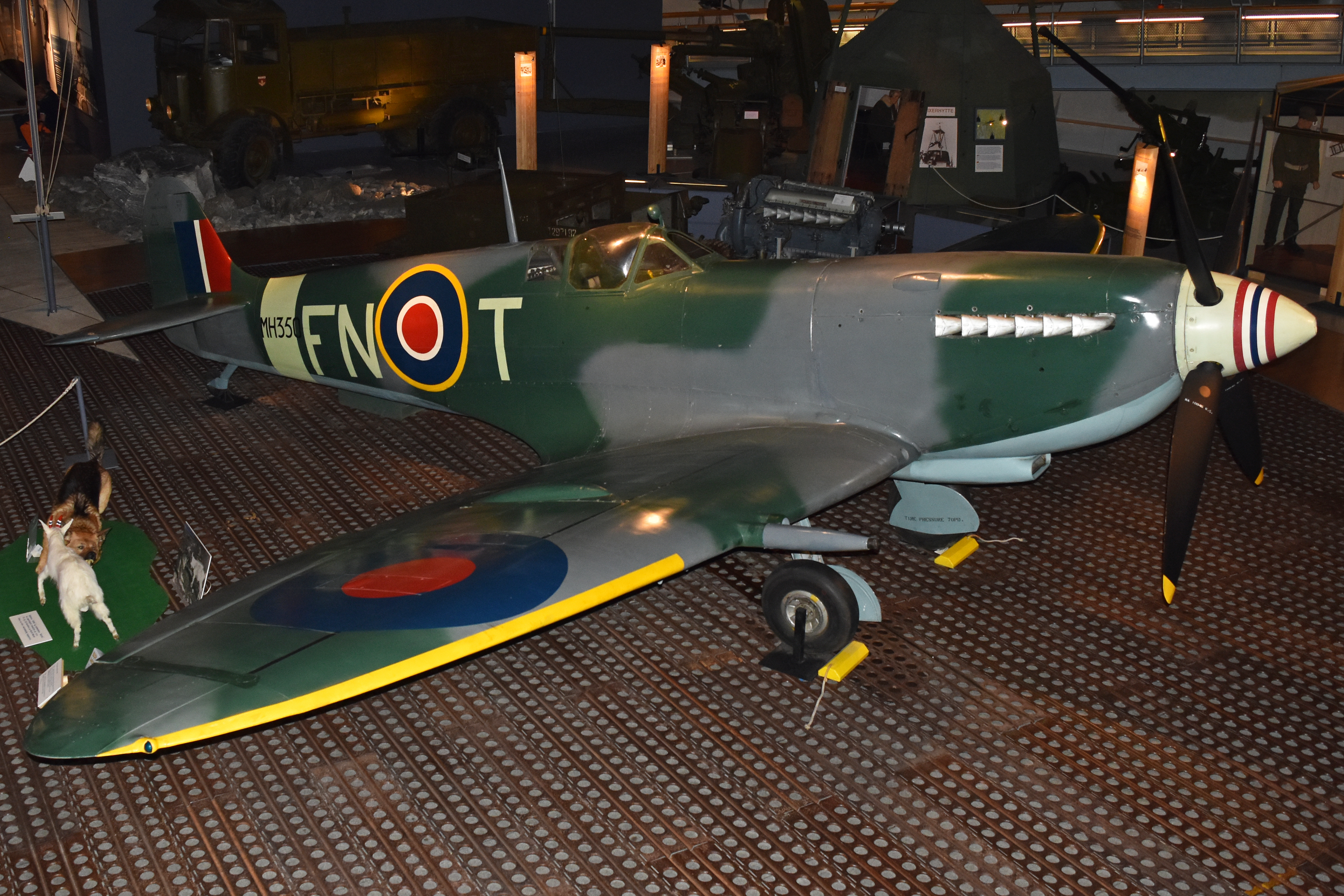
A Supermarine Spitfire the primary British fighter of World War II. This is a late WWII Spitfire mk LF IX the most produced variant of the Spitfire.

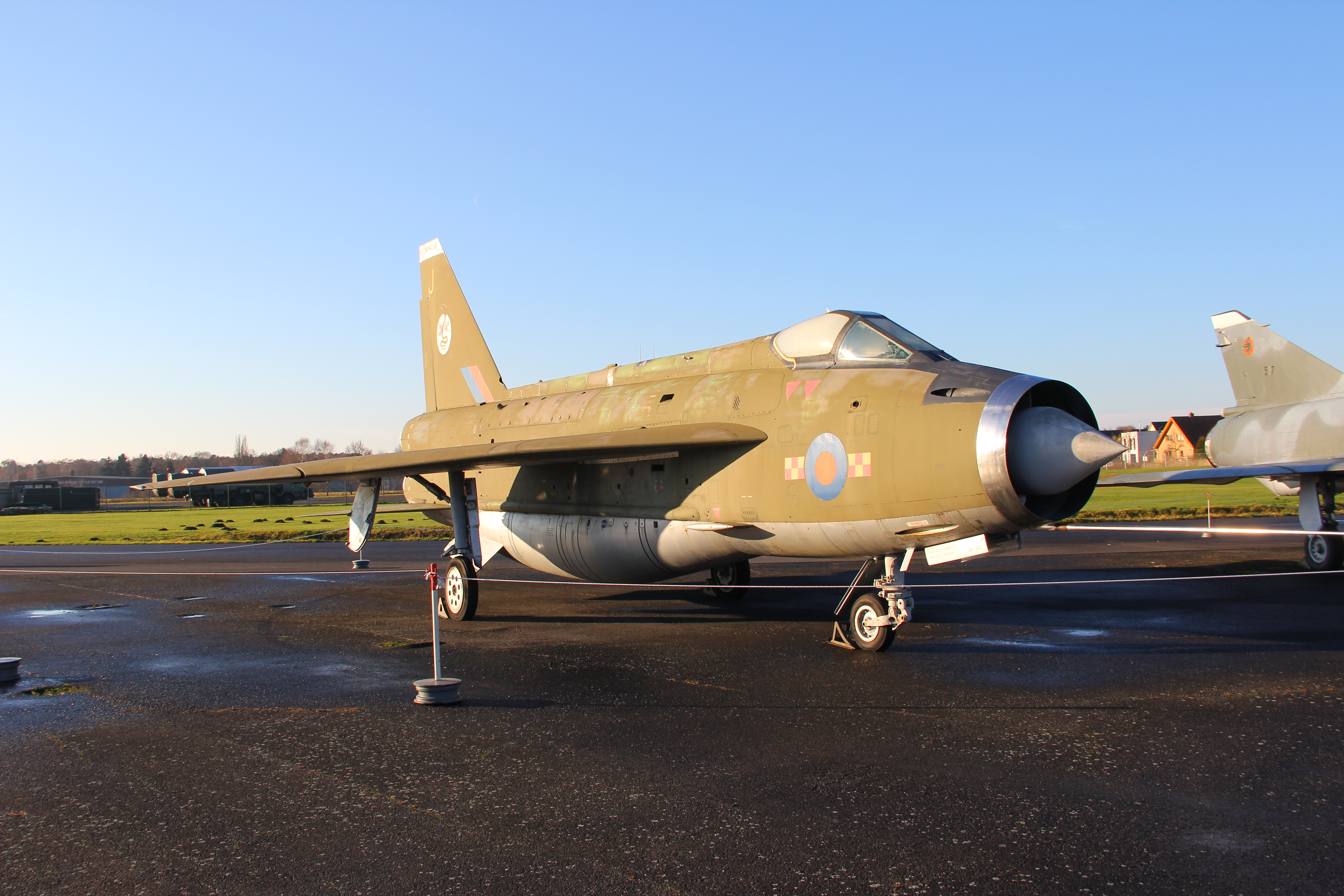
An English Electric Lightning which served as the primary British fighter for much of the Cold War. Only completely British built fighter aircraft capable of Mach 2.

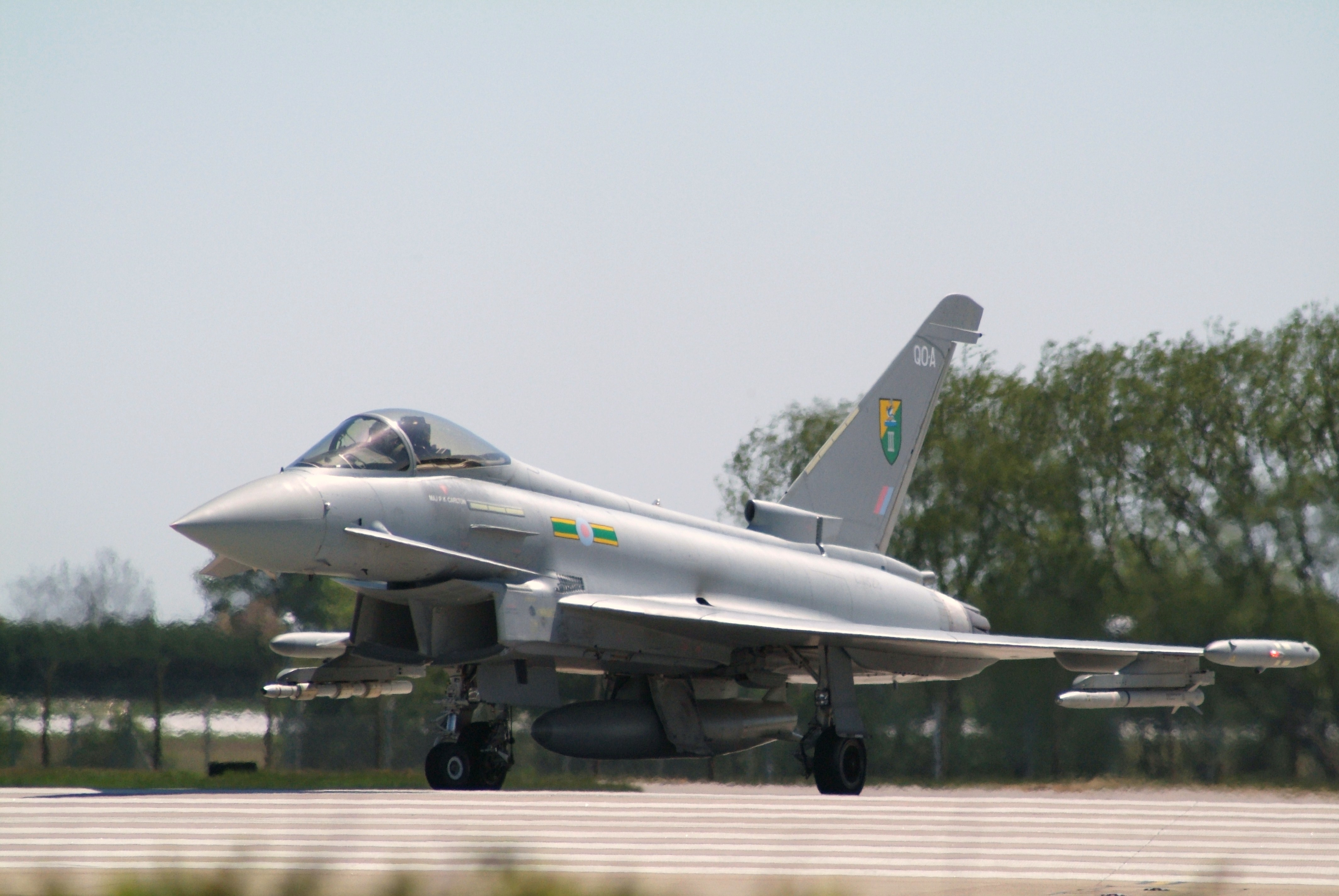
A Eurofighter Typhoon the current British fighter.
