= List of active military aircraft of the Philippines =

Defense aviation fleet for the Southeast Asian country

The following is a list of active military aircraft of the Philippines. The military of the Philippines has three branches; the Philippine Coast Guard is a civilian organisation operating under the Department of Transportation.

== Army Aviation Regiment ==
Aircraft	Origin	Type	Variant	In service	Notes
Fixed-Wing Aircraft
Short 330	United Kingdom	Utility aircraft		1	
Cessna 206	United States	utility		1	
Cessna 172	United States	utility	172M	2	(PA-071 & PA-072)
Cessna 150	United States	utility	150	1	(PA-911)
Rotary-Wing Aircraft
MBB Bo 105	Germany	Utility helicopter	Bo-105	4	t/n 203 donated by Manny V. Pangilinan, to be used to prepare for larger helicopters. t/n 224 donated by Dornier Technologies in October 2022. t/n 222 and 223 are also donated by still unidentified groups.
Robinson R44	United States	trainer	R44 Raven II	2	Serve as trainer aircraft for the future acquisition of helicopters in the Army.
Unmanned Aerial Vehicle
Hermes 450	Israel	tactical UAV		(+4)	Tier III UAV. Only 1 system made up of 4 UAVs and a ground control station.
Skylark	Israel	hand-launched UAV catapult-launched UAV	Skylark I-LEX Skylark 3	-	Tier I UAV. Acquired under USD180 million deal. Tier II UAV. Acquired under USD180 million deal.
Thor	Israel	VTOL UAV		(+1066)	Tier I UAV. 533 systems made up of 2 UAV each. Acquired under deal with Elbit under a USD153 million deal.
DJI Phantom	China	VTOL UAV	Phantom 3 Professional Phantom 4	unknown	Commercial drones bought off-the-shelf by Philippine Army units.
Raptor Knight Falcon	Philippines	miniature UAV		2(+1)	The first drone, it is smaller and has less endurance than the Knight Falcon. The second drone. A third unnamed drone is in the works.

== Naval Air Wing ==
Aircraft	Origin	Type	Variant	In service	Notes
Maritime patrol
Beechcraft King Air	United States	utility / patrol	TC-90	5	ex-Japan Maritime Self-Defense Force
Britten-Norman BN-2	United Kingdom	patrol / utility	BN-2A	5	
Helicopters
Leonardo AW159	United Kingdom	utility / ASW		2	
AgustaWestland AW109	Italy	utility / SAR		5	
Trainer Aircraft
Cessna 172	United States	trainer / light utility	172S	4	
Robinson R44	United States	rotorcraft trainer			3 on order

== See also ==
- Philippine Coast Guard#Aircraft in service
