= List of military aircraft of Sri Lanka =

This is a list of aircraft of the Sri Lanka Air Force and the Sri Lanka Navy Fleet Air Arm (FAA).

== List of aircraft alphabetically by manufacturer ==
=== A ===
- AAI/IAI RQ-2 Pioneer
- Aerospatiale SA 365 Dauphin
- Airspeed Oxford
- Antonov An-32

=== B ===
- BAC Jet Provost T.51
- Beechcraft 200
- Beechcraft Model 18 (transferred from the Surveyor General's Department)
- Bell 47 Sioux
- Bell 206 Jet Ranger
- Bell 212
- Bell 412
- Boulton Paul Balliol

=== C ===
- Cessna 150
- Cessna 336 Skymaster
- Cessna 421 Golden Eagle
- Chengdu F-7GS Skybolt
- FT-7M Skybolt
- Convair 240

=== D ===
- de Havilland Canada DHC-1 Chipmunk
- de Havilland DH.104 Dove
- de Havilland Heron
- de Havilland Tiger Moth (Transferred from the Ratmalana Civil Flying Training School)
- de Havilland Vampire
- Douglas Dakota

=== F ===
- FMA IA 58 Pucará

=== H ===
- HAL Chetak (FAA)
- Harbin Y-12
- Hawker Siddeley HS 748
- Hiller UH-12B

=== I ===
- IAI Kfir
- IAI Scout
- IAI Searcher Mk II

=== K ===
- Kamov Ka-26

=== L ===
- Lockheed Hercules
- Lihiniya MK I

=== M ===
- Mikoyan-Gurevich MiG-15UTI
- Mikoyan-Gurevich MiG-17F
- Mikoyan-Gurevich MiG-23UB
- Mikoyan-Gurevich MiG-27M
- Mil Mi-17
- Mil Mi-24

=== N ===
- Nanchang CJ-6 (PT-6)
- K-8 Karakorum
- North American P-51 Mustang

=== P ===
- Pazmany PL-

=== S ===
- Scottish Aviation Pioneer
- Shaanxi Y-8
- Shenyang F-5
- Sikorsky H-5 Dragonfly
- SIAI Marchetti SF.260TP
- SIAI Marchetti SF.260W

=== T ===
- Taylorcraft Auster

== Current aircraft ==
=== Attack and Offensive Support Aircraft ===
- IAI Kfir
- F-7 Skybolt

=== Reconnaissance and Maritime Patrol Aircraft ===
- Beechcraft 200
- Lihiniya MK I

=== Transport Aircraft ===
- C-130 Hercules
- Antonov 32
- Harbin Y-12

=== Attack helicopters ===
- Mil Mi-24

=== Support and Transport Helicopters ===
- Mil Mi-16
- Bell 412
- Bell 212
- Bell 206

=== Training Aircraft ===
- K-8 Karakorum
- Nanchang CJ-6 (PT-6)
- Cessna 150
- Chengdu FT-7

== Weapons ==
=== Air to Air Missiles ===
- PL-5 Thunderbolt

=== General-Purpose Bombs ===
- Mark 83
- Mark 82

=== Surface to Air Missiles ===
- SA-16 Gimlet

=== Air Defense Artillery ===
- Bofors L40/70 40 mm AA guns
- ZSU-23-2 twin 23 mm AA guns
- TCM-20 twin 20 mm AA guns

== Equipment ==
- INDRA low altitude 2D radar
- CETC YLC-18 3D Radar.
- JY-11 Radar low/medium altitude 3D surveillance radar

== Surviving SLAF aircraft ==
Aircraft that have been preserved by the SLAF. A few of these fly but most are held by SLAF Museum.

- Airspeed Oxford
- Hawker Siddeley HS 748
- Sikorsky H-5 Dragonfly
- Mikoyan-Gurevich MiG-17F
- FMA IA 58 Pucará
- BAC Jet Provost
- Boulton Paul Balliol
- de Havilland Canada DHC-1 Chipmunk
- de Havilland Heron
- de Havilland Tiger Moth

== See also ==
- List of aircraft losses of the Sri Lankan Civil War
