= List of aircraft of Poland during World War II =

The following article is a List of aircraft of Poland during World War II.

== List of 1939-1945 ==
(Built vs Used in Combat)

=== Fighters ===
- PZL P.11 (175 vs 140)
- PZL P.7 (105 vs 30) - obsolete by 1939

=== Light/Tactical Bombers ===
- PZL.23A Karaś (30 vs 0) - experimental version
- PZL.23B Karaś (170 vs 120)
- PZL.46 Sum - (2 vs 2) - prototypes only

=== Medium/Heavy Bombers ===
- PZL.37 Łoś (61 vs 36) - few built due to Polish Army objections and only a few in operational condition
- PZL.30 Żubr (30 vs 0) - obsolete by 1939
- PZL.49 Miś - never built due to outbreak of World War 2

=== Reconnaissance/Close Support aircraft ===
- Lublin R-XIII (150 vs 55)
- LWS-3 Mewa (2 vs 2) - prototypes only
- RWD-14 Czapla (60 vs 40)

=== Trainers ===
- PWS-10 (80 vs ?)
- PWS-26 (320 vs ?)
- RWD-8 (550 vs ?)

=== Transports ===
- PWS-24bis (3 vs 3)

== See also ==
- Polish Air Force order of battle in 1939
