= List of historic Bangladesh military aircraft =

== Bangladesh Air Force ==
Aircraft	Origin	Role	Version	Quantity	Note
Fixed Wing Aircraft
Antonov An-12	USSR	Military transport aircraft		4	
Antonov An-24	USSR	Military transport aircraft	V	3	V.I.P Transport Aircraft. Also known as "Balaka" (”বলাকা”). 1 stored in BAF Museum for ride.
Antonov An-26	USSR	Military transport aircraft		6	
Cessna T-37 Tweet	USA	Jet Trainer	B	11	Retired from active service. Replaced with Hongdu K-8W jet trainers.
de Havilland Canada DHC-3 Otter	Canada	Military transport aircraft		1	Ex Indian Air Force (IAF) Aircraft. Registered as B-721
Douglas Dakota	USA	Military transport aircraft		1	Ex Indian Air Force (IAF) Aircraft. Also used by the "Maharaja Of Jodhpur"
Fouga CM.170 Magister	France	Jet Trainer		19	Retired in favor of more capable Aero L-39 Albatros.
F-7 Air Guard	China	Fighter aircraft	MB	10	Retired in favor of more capable F-7BGI.
Nanchang A-5	China	Ground attack/Close air support	C	8	Retired on 4 November 2014
North American F-86 Sabre	USA	Fighter aircraft	F40	8	Surrendered by Pakistan Air Force.
Mikoyan-Gurevich MiG-21	USSR	Fighter aircraft	MF/UB	12	10 MiG-21MF's and 2 MiG-21UB's. 2 aircraft Registered as 008 & 009 set up as a Sculpture on BAF Headquarters in Dhaka Cantonment.
Shenyang F-5	China	Interceptor aircraft		8	
Shenyang FT-5	China	Interceptor aircraft		3	Trainer version of the F-5
Shenyang F-6	China	OCU		34	1 squadron gifted by Pakistan in 1980s.
Helicopters
Aérospatiale Alouette III	France	Utility helicopter		1	Ex Indian Air Force.
Agusta-Bell 205	Italy	Transport Helicopter		2	Ex Imperial Iranian Air Force.
Mil Mi-8	USSR	Transport Helicopter		8	Some of them are stored as a ride in BAF Museum, Agargaon
Westland Wessex	UK	Transport helicopter	5	2	Former Royal Navy helicopters donated by the United Kingdom in 1973.

== Bangladesh Army Aviation Group ==
Aircraft	Origin	Role	Version	Quantity	Note
Fixed Wing Aircraft
Piper PA-31T Cheyenne	USA	Utility aircraft		1	This aircraft was helped to make Bangladesh Army Aviation Group.
Helicopter
Bell 205	USA	Utility Helicopter		2	Was gifted by Iran.

== Gallery ==
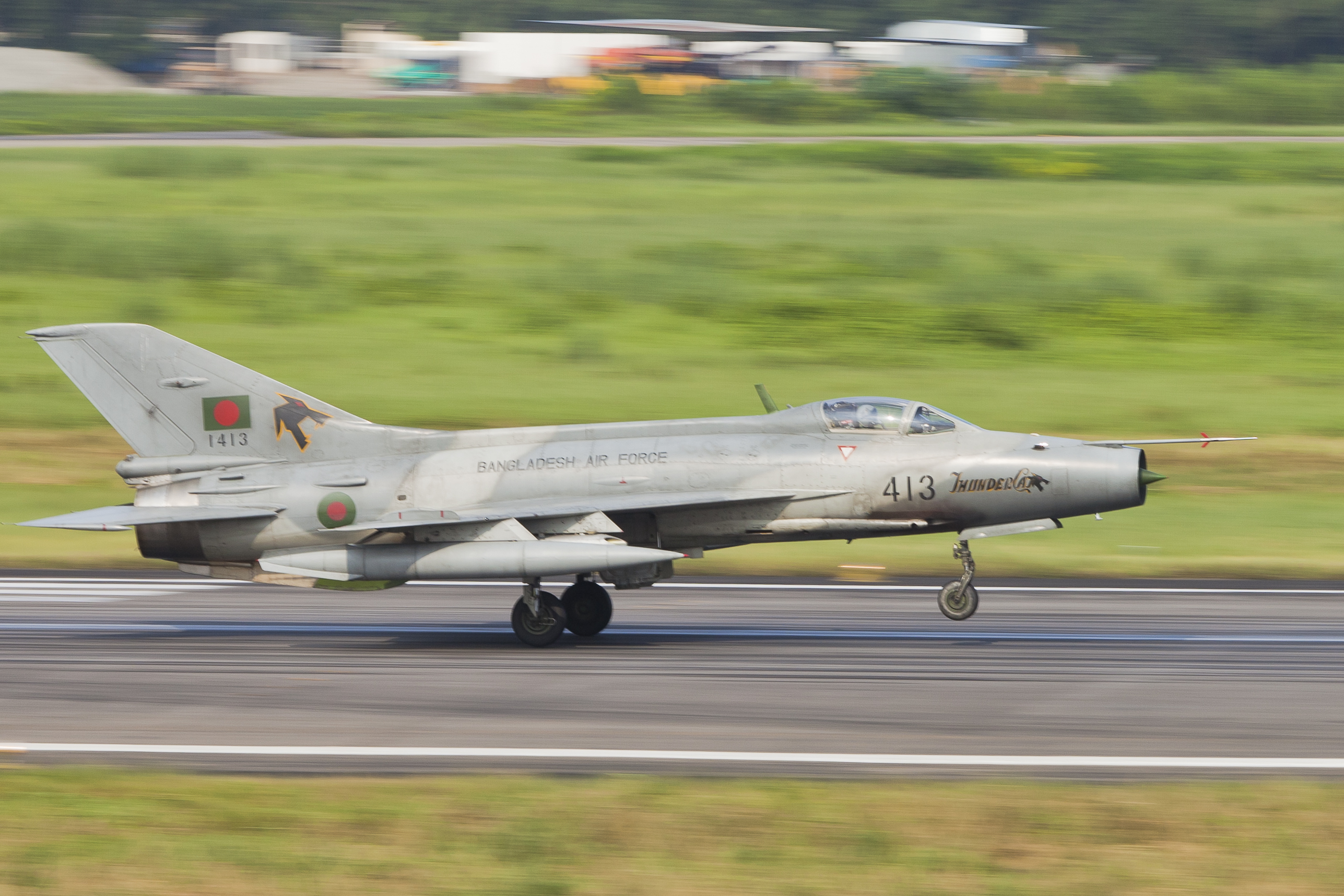
Chengdu F-7 MB fighter aircraft of BAF

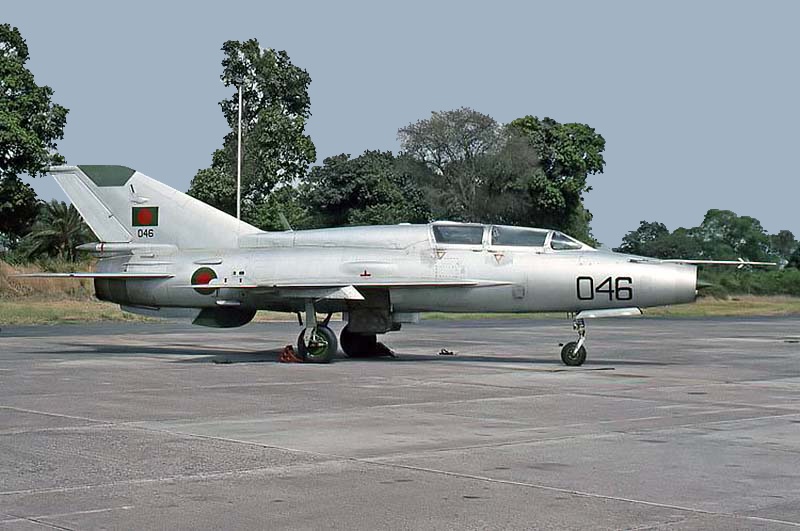
MiG-21UB fighter aircraft of BAF

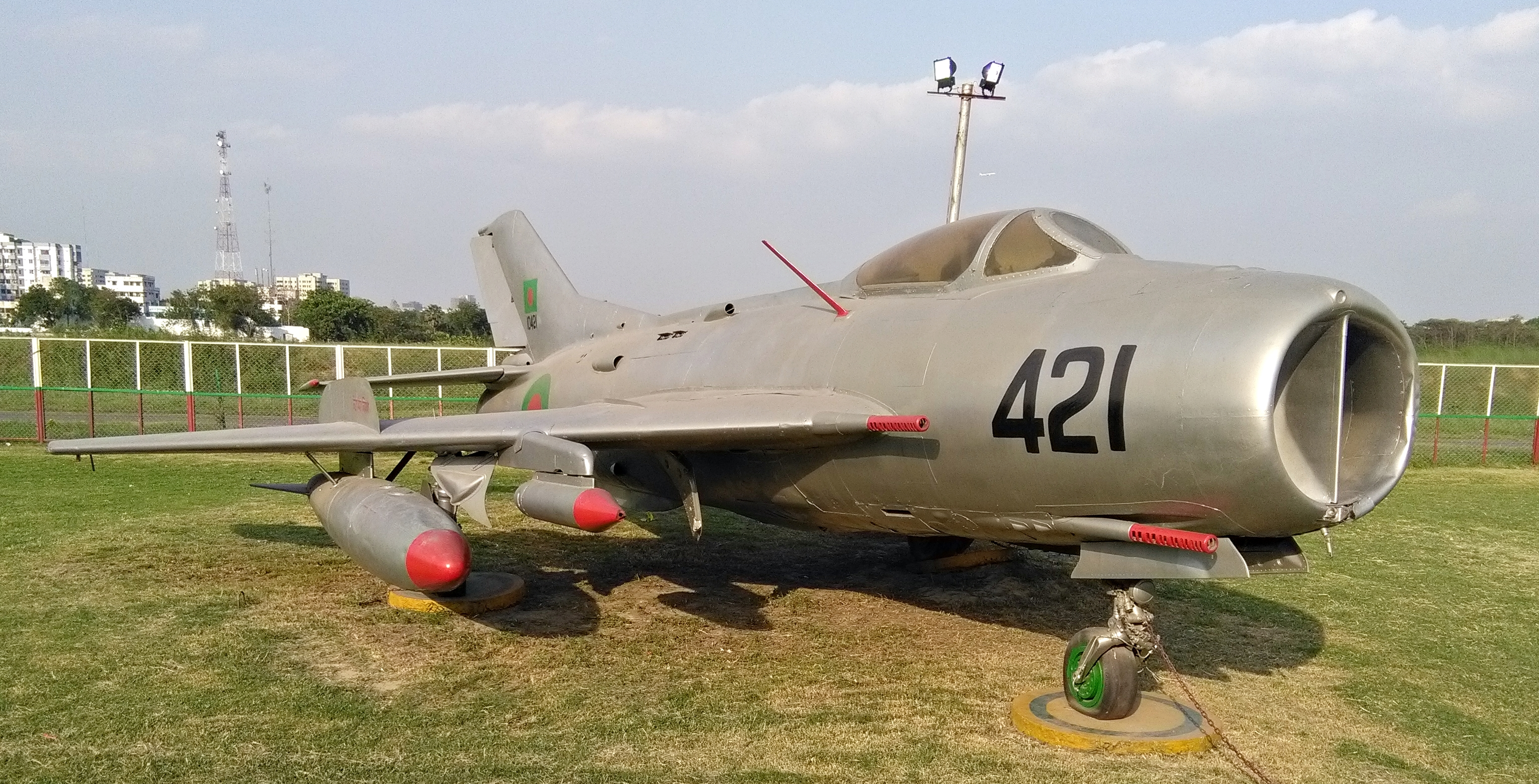
Shenyang F-6 fighter aircraft at BAF Museum

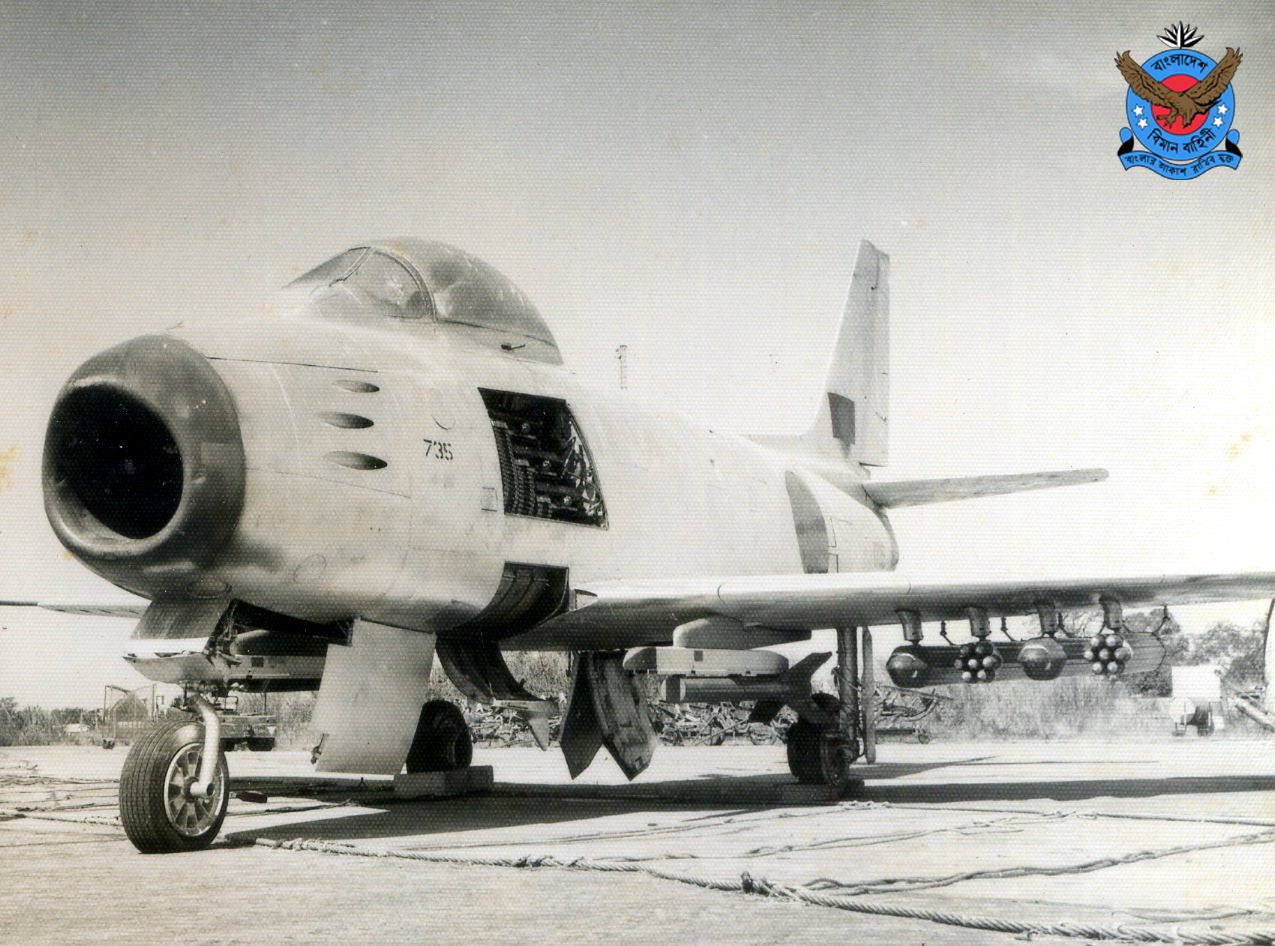
BAF's F-86F40 Sabre interceptor aircraft

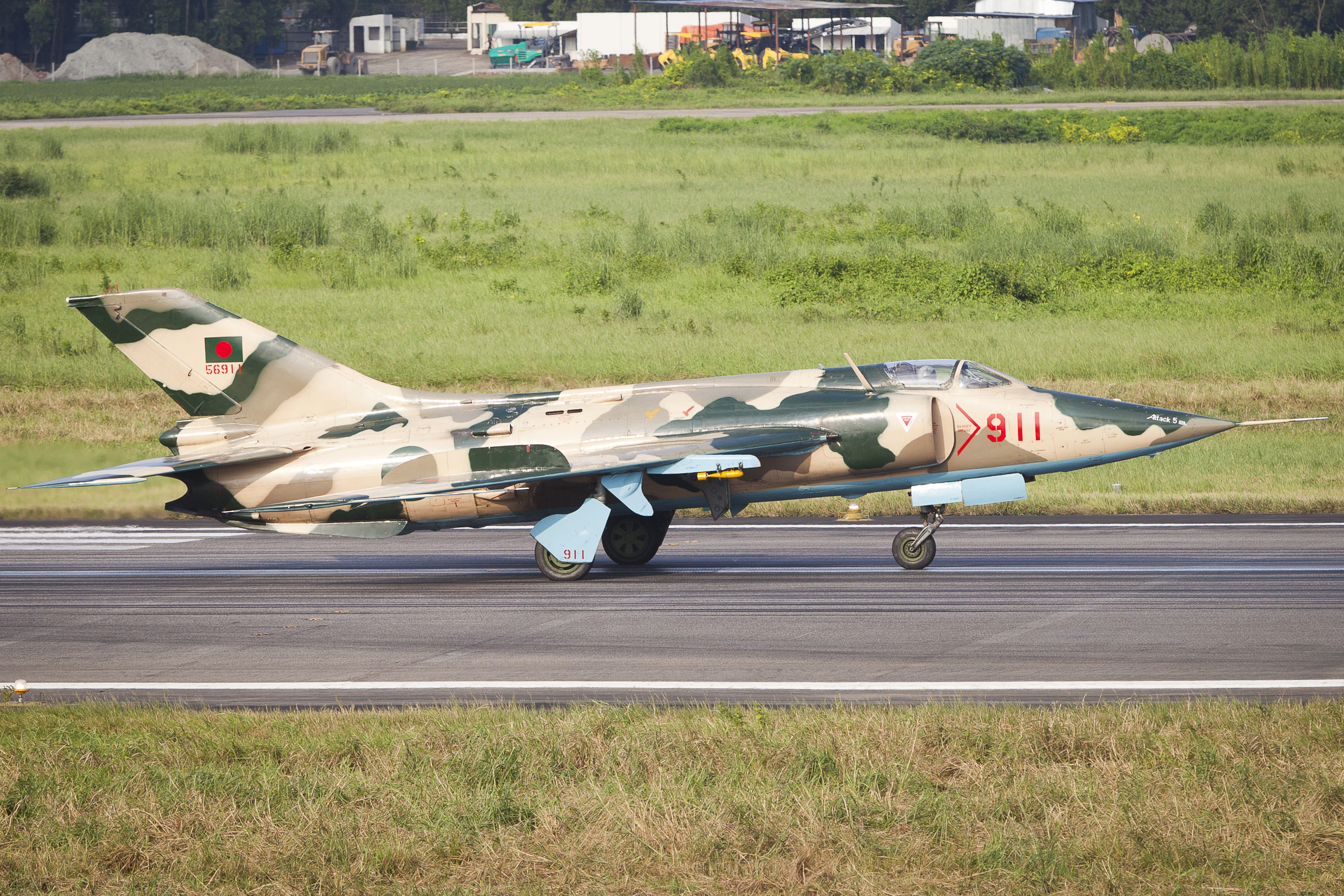
Nanchang A-5 ground attack aircraft of BAF

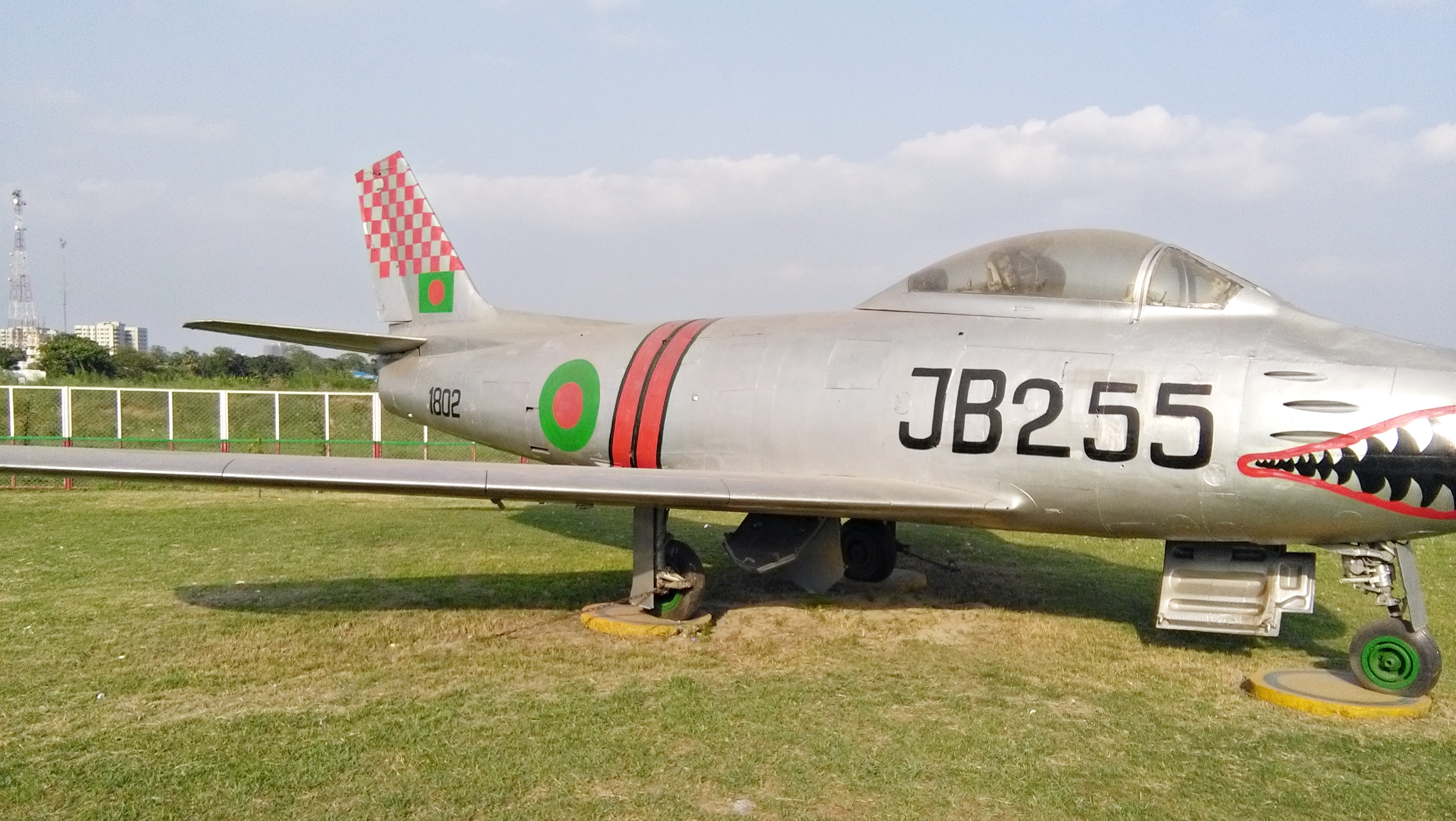
F-86 Sabre fighter Aircraft at BAF Museum

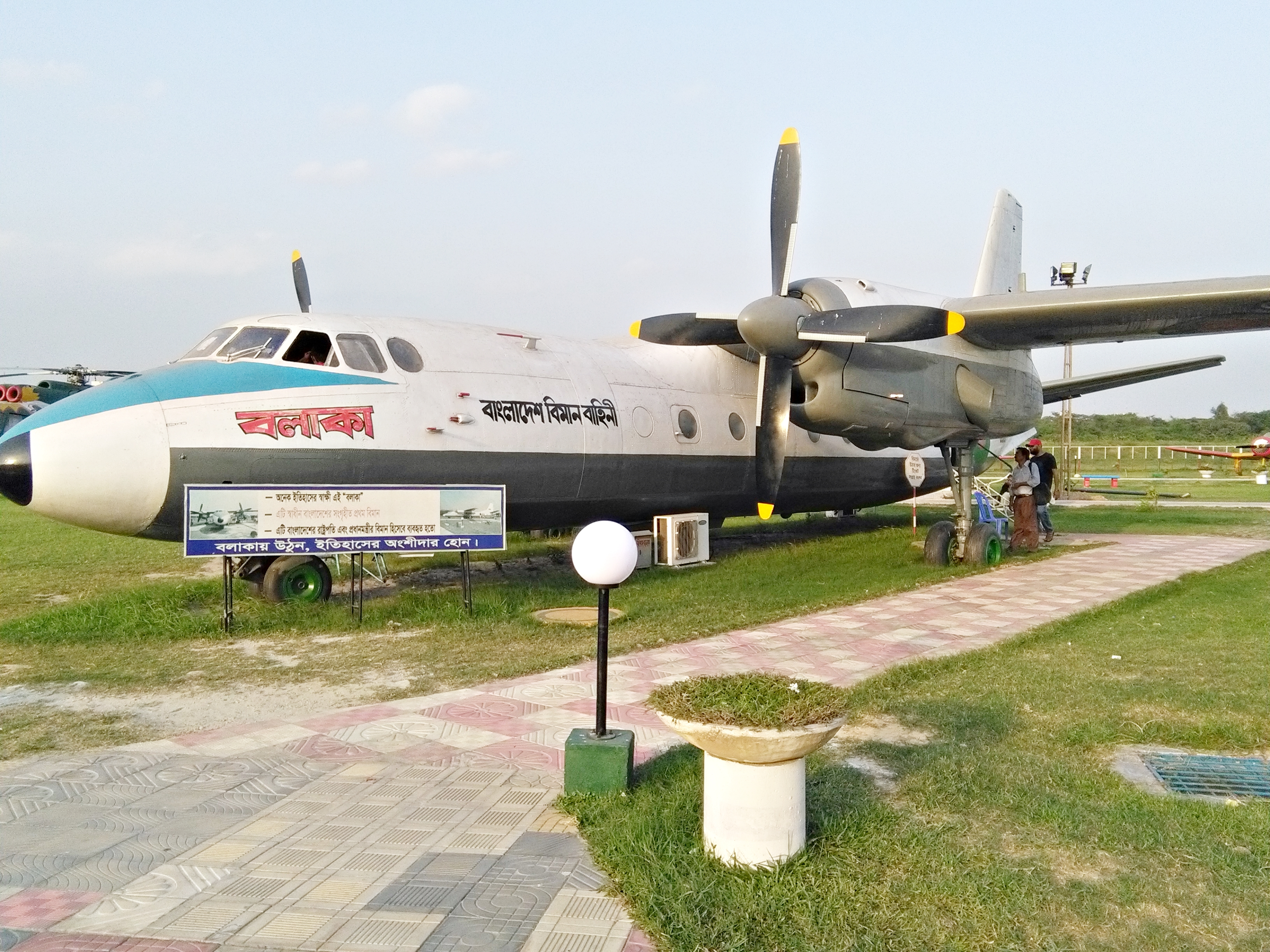
Antonov An-24 transport aircraft of BAF

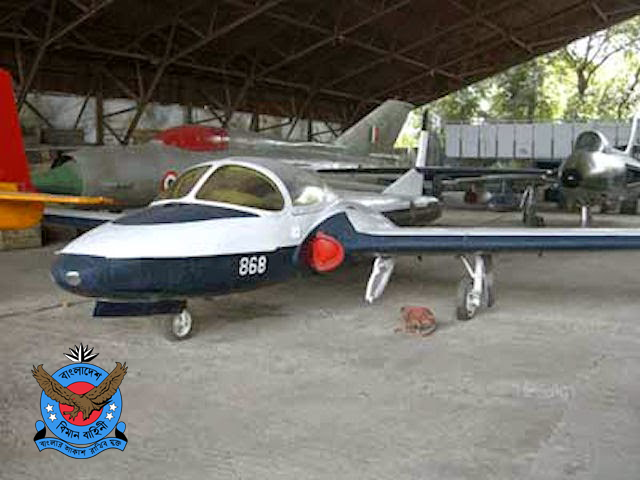
Cessna T-37 jet trainer of BAF

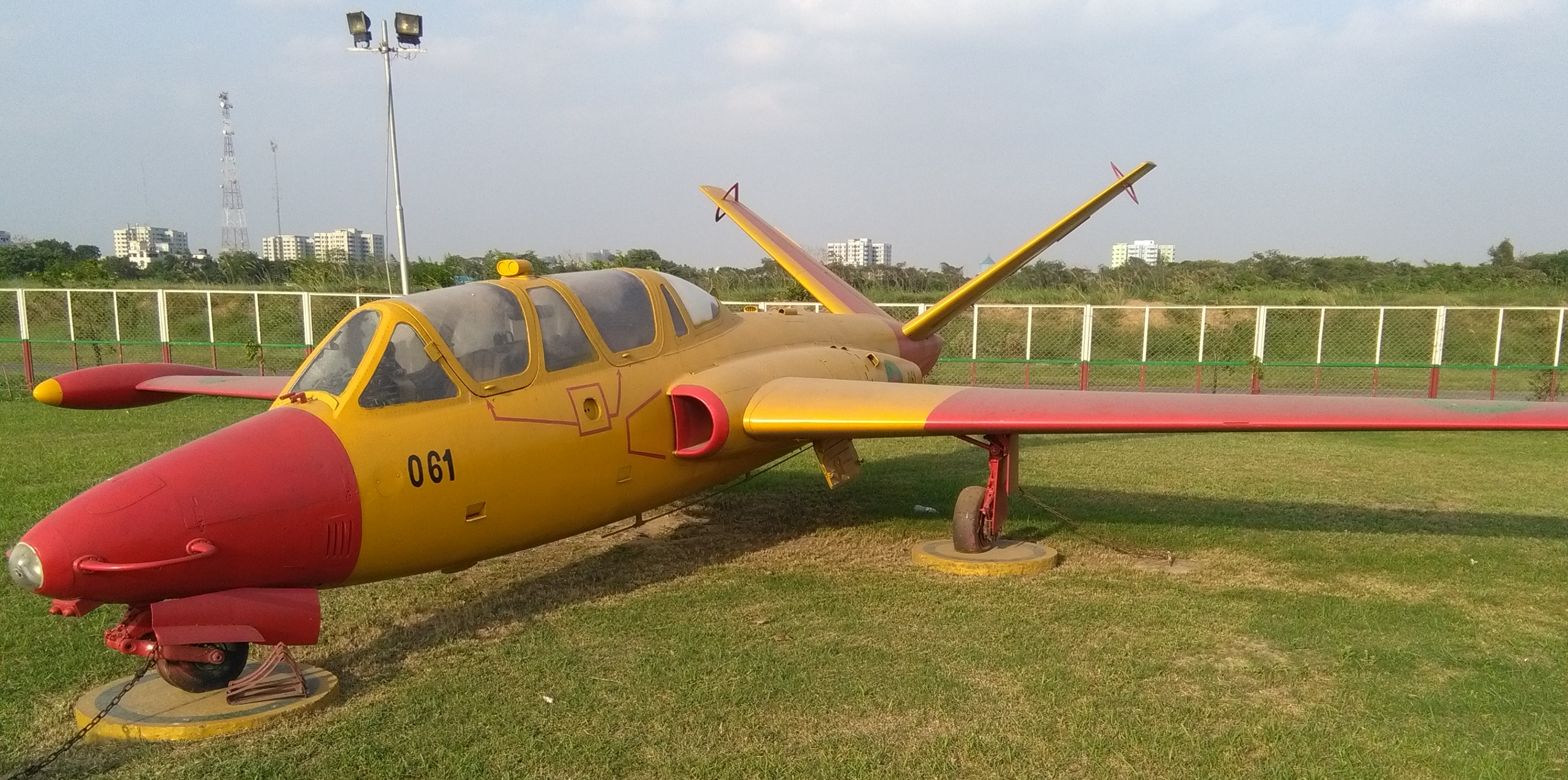
Fouga CM.170 Magister jet trainer at BAF Museum

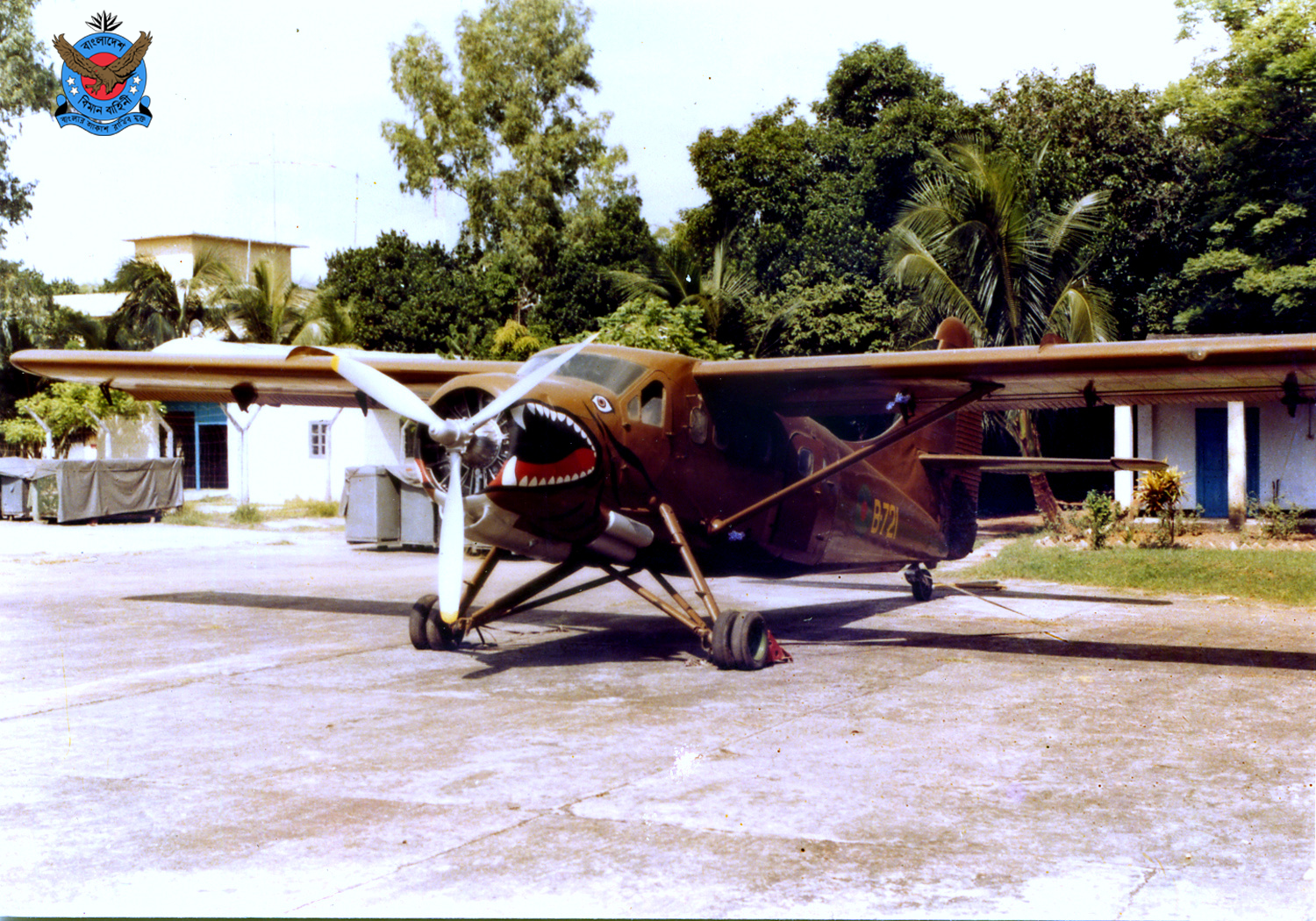
de Havilland Canada DHC-3 Otter of BAF

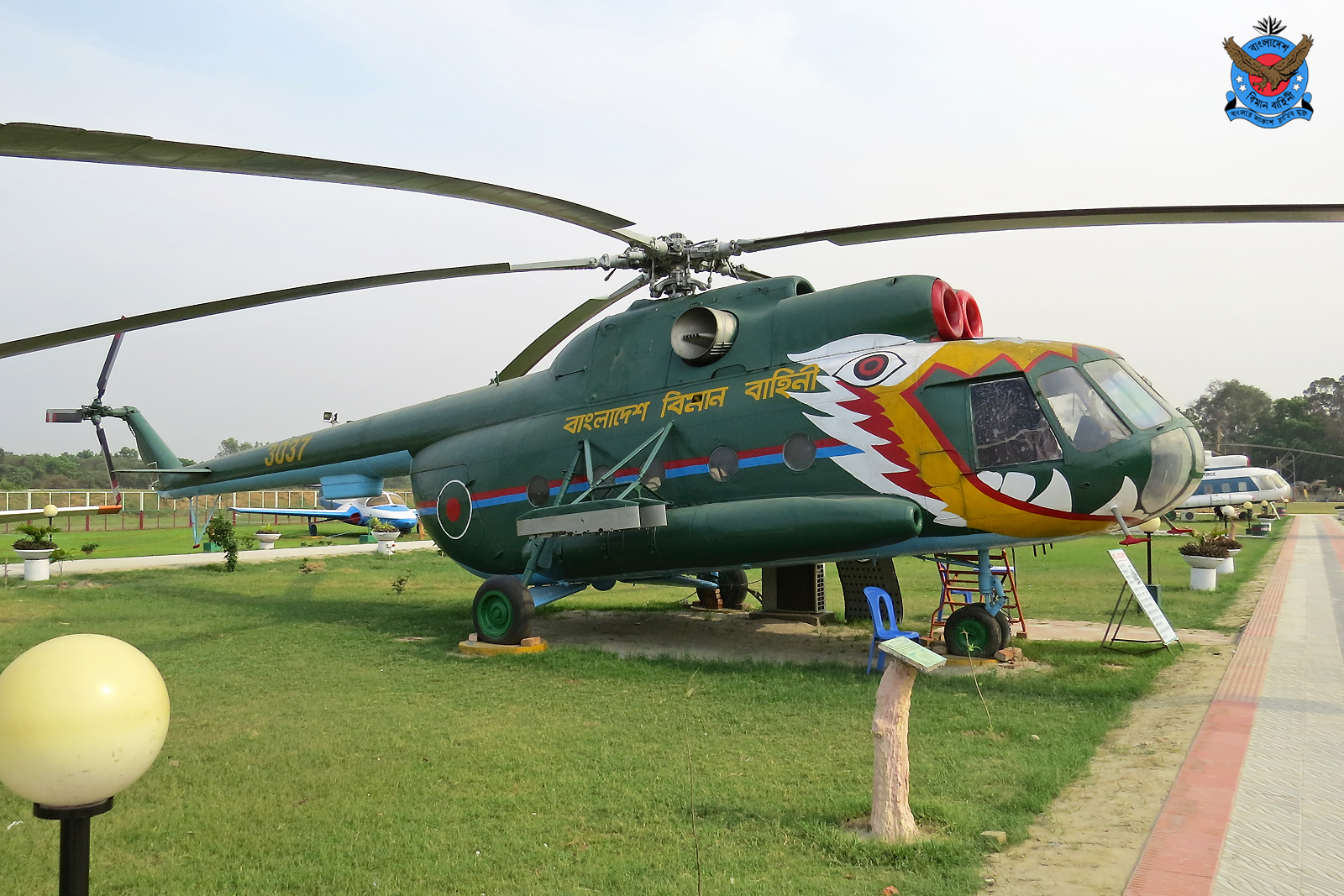
Mil Mi-8 helicopter at BAF Museum

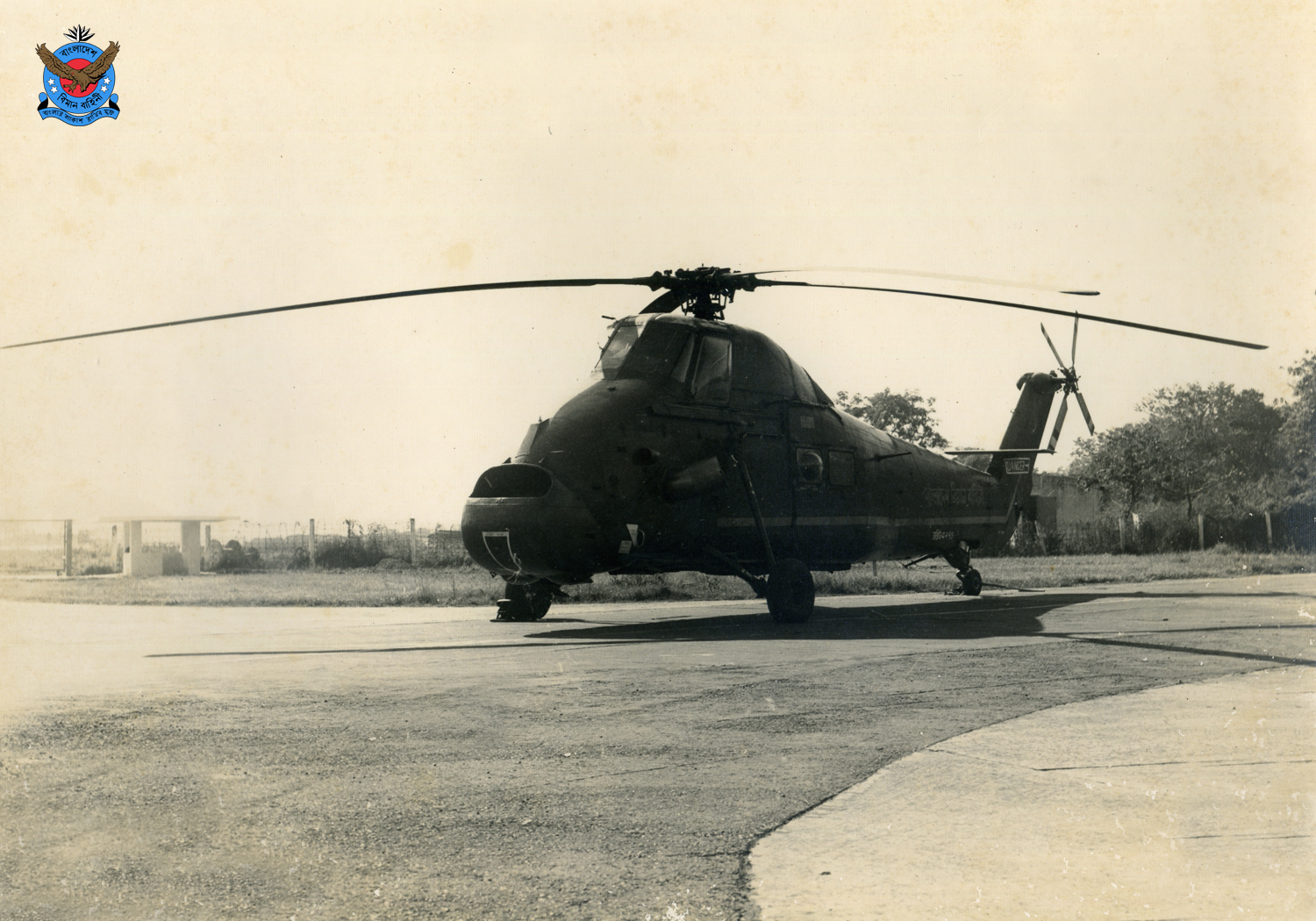
Westland Wessex helicopter of BAF

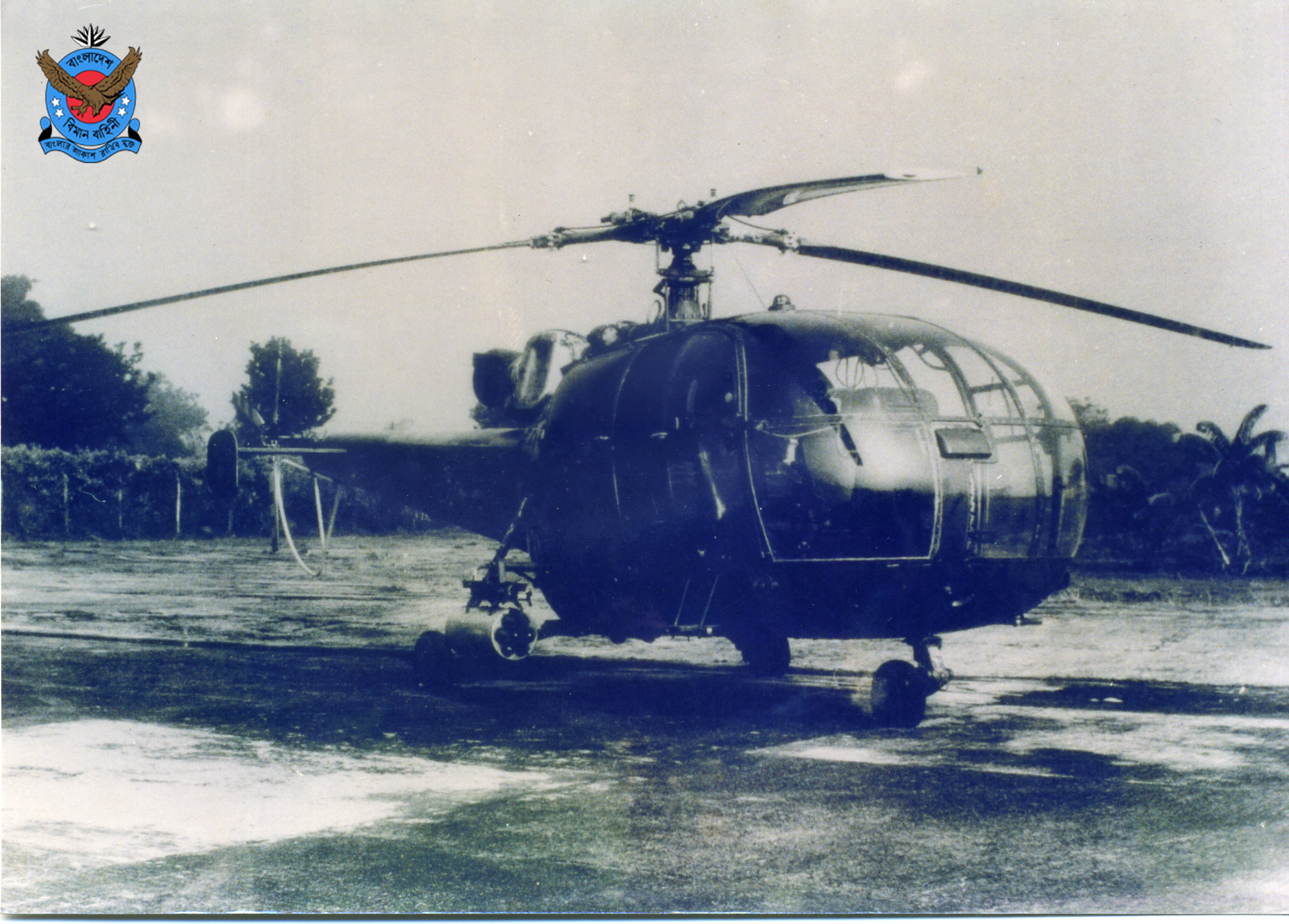
Aérospatiale Alouette III helicopter of BAF

== See also ==
- Bangabandhu Aeronautical Centre
