= List of retired Polish Air Force aircraft =

List of retired aircraft types used by Polish Air Force Aircraft whose service end date is 1939 were captured or destroyed following the 1939 Invasion of Poland.

Aircraft	Origin	Type	Variant	In service	# of aircraft	Notes
AEG C.IV	Germany	reconnaissance		1919–1921	91	
Albatros C.I	Germany	reconnaissance		1919–1922	49	
Albatros C.III	Germany	reconnaissance		1918–1922	15	
Albatros C.VII	Germany	reconnaissance		1919–1922	27	
Albatros C.X	Germany	reconnaissance		1918–1925	32	
Albatros C.XII	Germany	reconnaissance		1919–1921	24	
Albatros C.XV	Germany	reconnaissance		1920–1922	18	
Albatros J.I	Germany	attack		1919–1922	10	
Amiot 123	France	night bomber	123 BN.3	1928–1929	2	
Antonov An-12	USSR	transport	An-12B	1966–1995	2	one crashed in 1977
Antonov An-24	USSR	transport	An-24W	1966–1977	6	one crashed in 1973
Antonov An-26	USSR	transport	An-26	1972–2009	12	
Ansaldo A-1 Balilla	Italy	fighter		1920–1927	105	
Ansaldo A.300	Italy	bomber/reconnaissance	A.300/4	1920–1925	80	
Avia B-33	Czechoslovakia	attack	B-33	1954–1961	281	Ilyushin Il-10 built under licence in Czechoslovakia
Avia S-102/CS-201	Czechoslovakia	fighter fighter-trainer	S-102 CS-102	1953– 1955–	60 96	MiG-15 built under licence in Czechoslovakia
Bartel BM.4	Poland	trainer	BM.4	1928–1939	75	
Bartel BM.5	Poland	trainer	BM.5	1929–1939	60	
Bell 412	USA/Canada	transport helicopter	412SP/HP 412HP	1991-1991 1993–2011	2 1	Leased for 1991 Papal visit. Transferred to Police.
Brandenburg C.I	Austro-Hungary	reconnaissance		1918–1926	49	22 original, at least 27 produced in Poland
Bréguet Br.XIV	France	reconnaissance bomber	Br.XIVA2 Br.XIVB2, B2bis	1919–1935	158	Also as air ambulances
Breguet XIX	France	bomber fighter	B.2/B.2GR C.2	1925–1939 1930–1931	250 3	
Bristol F.2 Fighter	Great Britain	fighter/reconnaissance	F.2B	1920–1932	106	
CWL WZ.X	Poland	reconnaissance	WZ-XLD/WZ-XBJ	1926–1935	4	
de Havilland DH.9	UK	bomber		1920–1928	20	
de Havilland DH.60 Moth	UK	trainer	DH.60G	1928–1935	3	
DFW C.V	Germany	reconnaissance		1918–1923	63	
Douglas Dakota	USA	transport		1945–	11	
Farman F.60 Goliath	France	night bomber	F.68 BN.4	1926–1935	32	
Focke-Wulf Fw 58	Germany	liaison		1944–1954	1	captured
Fokker F.VII	Netherlands	transport/bomber	VIIb/3m VIIa/1m	1930–1939 1938–1939	23 3	
Fieseler Fi 156	Germany	liaison		1945–	5	
Halberstadt C.V	Germany	reconnaissance		1919–1921	12	
Halberstadt CL.II	Germany	reconnaissance/fighter		1918–1922	15	
Hannover CL.II / III	Germany	reconnaissance/fighter	CL.II, CL.IIa CL.III	1919–1922	23 1	
Hanriot HD-14	France	trainer ambulance	HD-14 HD-14S	1924–1934 1925–1935	70 2	
Hanriot HD-19	France	trainer	HD-19bis	1924–1937	56	
Hanriot HD-28	France	trainer ambulance	HD-28 HD-28S	1925–1939 1927–1935	220 16	
Ilyushin Il-2	USSR	attack	Il-2M/M3/UIl-2	1944–1949	200+	
Ilyushin Il-10	USSR	attack trainer	Il-10 UIl-10	1949–1959	96 24	
Ilyushin Il-12	USSR	transport	Il-12D	1957–1967	3	
Ilyushin Il-14	USSR	transport	Il-14P/T/S	1955–1990	17	
Ilyushin Il-18	USSR	transport	Il-18W	1961–1987	5	
Ilyushin Il-28	USSR	bomber trainer reconnaissance	Il-28 Il-28U Il-28R	1952–1979	72 16 15	
LET/Letov-Kunovic C-11	Czechoslovakia	trainer	C-11	1954-1964	37	Yak-11 built under licence in Czechoslovakia
Lisunov Li-2	USSR	transport		1945–1968	19	Douglas DC-3 built under licence in USSR
Lublin R-VIII	Poland	reconnaissance	R-VIII R-VIIIa	1928–1932 1930–1932	2 4	2 modified to R-VIIIter floatplanes for Polish navy in 1932
Lublin R-X	Poland	liaison	R-X R-Xa	1929–1935	1 6	
Lublin R-XIII	Poland	liaison	R-XIII R-XIIIA R-XIIIB R-XIIIC R-XIIID R-XIIIE R-XIIIF Total	1931–1932 1932–1939 1932–1939 1933–1939 1933–1939 1934–1938 1934–1939 1931–1939	1 30 20 48 95 1 58 253	
Lublin R-XIV	Poland	trainer	R-XIV R-XIVb	1930–1939 1932–1939	15 6	
LWD Junak	Poland	trainer	Junak 2 Junak 3	1952–1955 1954–1961	71 93	To civilian flying clubs.
LWS-3 Mewa	Poland	liaison	LWS-3	1938–1939	2	
LWS Zubr	Poland	bomber/trainer	LWS-4 LWS-6	1938–1939	4 1	
Messerschmitt Bf 108	Germany	liaison	Bf 108B-2	1947–1948	3	captured aircraft rebuilt at PZL-Mielec factory
Mikoyan-Gurevich MiG-15	USSR	fighter fighter fighter trainer	MiG-15 MiG-15bis MiG-15UTI	1951– 1953– 1951–	60 36 19	
Mikoyan-Gurevich MiG-17	USSR	interceptor	MiG-17PF	1955–1965	12	
Mikoyan-Gurevich MiG-19	USSR	fighter interceptor	MiG-19P MiG-19PM	1957–1974	24 11	
Mikoyan-Gurevich MiG-21	USSR	fighter	MiG-21F-13 MiG-21PF MiG-21PFM MiG-21R MiG-21M MiG-21MF MiG-21MF-75 MiG-21bis Total	1963–1971 1964–1989 1966–1995 1968–2002 1969–2002 1972–2003 1975–1999 1980–2003 1963–2003	25 84 132 36 36 100 20 72 505	
Mikoyan-Gurevich MiG-21	USSR	fighter trainer	MiG-21U MiG-21US MiG-21UM	1965–1990 1969–1992 1971-2003	11 12 54	
Mikoyan-Gurevich MiG-23	USSR	fighter fighter trainer	MiG-23MF MiG-23UB	1979–1999	36 6	
Mil Mi-4	USSR	utility helicopter	Mi-4A	1958–1981	17	
Mil Mi-6	USSR	heavy lift helicopter	Mi-6A	1986–1990	3	
Morane-Saulnier AR/MS.35	France	trainer	MS.35 EP.2	1925–1939	70	
Petlyakov Pe-2	USSR	bomber	Pe-2FT	1944–1954	101	
Polikarpov Po-2	USSR	utility/trainer	Po-2	1944–1978	200+	
Potez XV	France	reconnaissance bomber	A.2 B.2	1924–1935	237 8	
Potez XXV	France	reconnaissance bomber	A.2 B.2	1927–1939 1931–1939	266 50	
Potez XXVII A.2	France	reconnaissance	A.2	1925–1937	175	
PWS-A	Czechoslovakia	fighter		1929–1935	51	Avia BH-33 built under licence in Poland.
PWS-5	Poland	liaison	T.2	1929–1935	7	
PWS-6	Poland	liaison	PWS-6	1930-1930	1	
PWS 10	Poland	fighter/ fighter-trainer	10M1 10	1930-1930 1931–1939	2 80	
PWS-14	Poland	trainer	PWS-14	1933–1939	20	
PWS-16	Poland	trainer	PWS-16 PWS-16bis	1933–1939 1934–1939	20 21	
PWS-18	Poland	trainer	PWS-18	1937–1939	41	
PWS-26	Poland	trainer	PWS-26	1934–1939	310	
PZL-104 Wilga	Poland	utility/reconnaissance	Wilga 35A	1973–1993	27	To civilian flying clubs.
PZL.23 Karaś	Poland	attack	23A 23B	1936–1939	40 210	
PZL.37 Łoś	Poland	bomber	37A 37B	1938–1939 1939–1939	30 45	
PZL.43	Poland	attack	43A	1939–1939	6	
PZL I-22 Iryda	Poland	trainer	M93K	1992–1996	8	
PZL Ł.2	Poland	liaison	Ł.2 Ł.2A	1929–1935	1 19	
PZL P.7	Poland	fighter/fighter-trainer	P.7a	1932–1939	149	
PZL P.11	Poland	fighter	P.11a P.11c	1934–1939 1935–1939	30 175	
PZL TS-8 Bies	Poland	trainer	BI/BII/BIII	1957–1970	250	To civilian flying clubs.
PZL TS-11 Iskra	Poland	trainer		1964-2021	424	
PZL-Mielec An-2	Poland	utility transport	An-2T/TD/W	1956–2012	138	Antonov An-2 built under licence in Poland. Some transferred to civil aviation.
PZL-Mielec Lim-1/2	Poland	fighter	Lim-1 Lim-2 Lim-1A Lim-2A SBLim-1 SBlim-2	1952–1980 1954–1996	200 404 20 53 27 96	MiG-15bis built under licence in Poland.Later, 27 single-seat Lim-1s and 96 Lim-2s were converted into two-seat trainers (SBLim-1, SBLim-2). Lim-1A and Lim-2A are tactical reconnaissance aircraft types.
PZL-Mielec Lim-5/6	Poland	fighter fighterbomber interceptor tactical reconnaissance fighterbomber fighterbomber all-weather fighter-bomber fighter-bomber tactical reconnaissance	Lim-5 Lim-5M Lim-5P Lim-5R Lim-6 Lim-6M Lim-6MR Lim-6bis Lim-6bisR	1956–1996 1959–1984 1960–1966 1965–1992 1965-1992 1965-1992 1963-1989 1964-1990 1965-1990	274 60 82 36 45 40 14 101 83	The MiG-17 was produced under license in Poland. In any case, in the end, these aircraft, including modifications of existing aircraft, remained in service. All were retired shortly after the 1990s. In addition, most of the aircraft were not exported to other countries.The aircraft that survived dismantling are still on display at museums in various regions. It is also painted so it does not look obsolete.
PZL SM-1	USSR; Poland	light utility/ training helicopter		1957–1983	30 ca.	Mil Mi-1 built under licence in Poland
PZL SM-2	Poland	light utility helicopter		1960–1979	50 ca.	
RWD-8	Poland	trainer	PWS	1934–1939	350	
RWD-13	Poland	ambulance	RWD-13S	1937–1937	3	
RWD-14 Czapla	Poland	liaison	RWD-14	1937–1939	65	
Shcherbakov Shche-2	USSR	transport	Shche-2	1945–1947	5	
SNCAC NC-701	France	transport/ aerial photography		1949–1955	6	former LOT Polish Airlines, Siebel Si 204 built in France
SPAD S.51 C.1	France	fighter	S.51 C.1	1925–1930	50	
SPAD S.61 C.1	France	fighter	S.61 C.1	1925–1932	280	
Sukhoi Su-7	USSR	attack	Su-7BM Su-7BKŁ Su-7U	1964–1990 1966–1990 1969–1990	6 31 8	
Sukhoi Su-20/22	USSR	attack reconnaissance attack attack trainer	Su-20 Su-20R Su-22M4 Su-22UM3K	1974–1997 1975–1997 1984–2025 1984–2025	19 8 90 20	
Tupolev SB	USSR	trainer	USB-2M-103			
Tupolev Tu-2	USSR	bomber/target tug	Tu-2S/UTu-2	1945–1960	8	
Tupolev Tu-134	USSR	transport	Tu-134A	1974–1992	4	
Tupolev Tu-154	USSR	transport	Tu-154M	1990–2011	2	one crashed in 2010
Wibault 70 C.1	France	fighter	70 C.1	1930–1937	25	
WSK CSS-13	Poland	utility/trainer ambulance	CSS-13 CSS S-13	1949–1978	560 53	Polikarpov Po-2 built under licence in Poland, 38 S-13s converted from CSS-13.
Yakovlev UT-2	USSR	trainer	UT-2	1944–1952	140	
Yakovlev Yak-1	USSR	fighter	Yak-1B	1943–1946	70	
Yakovlev Yak-3	USSR	fighter		1944–1945	25	
Yakovlev Yak-9	USSR	fighter	Yak-9 Yak-9M Yak-9T Yak-9W Yak-9U Yak-9P Total	1944 1944–1951 1944–1951 1945–1953 1945–1947 1947–1953 1944–1953	1 72 24 58 19 123 297	
Yakovlev Yak-11	USSR	trainer	Yak-11	1954–1962	101	
Yakovlev Yak-12	USSR; Poland	utility/trainer	Yak-12R/M/A	1951–	100+	To civilian flying clubs.
Yakovlev Yak-17	USSR	fighter fighter trainer	Yak-17 Yak-17UTI	1950–1955	3 11	
Yakovlev Yak-18	USSR	trainer	Yak-18	1949–1960	15+	To civilian flying clubs.
Yakovlev Yak-23	USSR	fighter	Yak-23	1950–1956	103	
Yakovlev Yak-40	USSR	transport		1973–2011	18	
