= Medwecki and Nowakowski M.N.3 =

M.N.3

General information
- Type: Four seat touring aircraft
- National origin: Poland
- Designer: Jozef Medwecki and Zygmunt Nowakowski
- Number built: 1

History
- First flight: late September 1928

The Medwecki and Nowakowski M.N.3 or just M.N.3 was a low-powered, four seat, Polish aircraft flown in 1928. The sole example was modified into a more powerful two-seater which served aeroclubs until World War II.

== Design and development ==
After the Medwecki HL 2 was badly damaged in a forced landing during the First National Lightplane Contest held in Poland in October 1927, Jozef Medwecki chose not to rebuild it for the following year's contest but to submit a new design. His collaboration with Zygmunt Nowakowski produced the single engine, four seat, braced parasol wing M.N.3. They received funding from L.O.P.P and assistance from Samolot, Medwecki's employer.

The M.N.3's wing was built in two parts around pairs of wooden spars and was plywood covered. It was essentially rectangular in plan, though with rounded tips and a small central cut-out in the trailing edge to improve the pilot's field of view. The half-wings joined over the fuselage, supported on a low cabane, but parallel steel tubes, enclosed in wooden streamlined fairings and stiffened with lighter N-struts between the lower fuselage and the spars, provided the primary bracing.

The four seat M.N.3 had been designed to be powered by a 45 kW (60 hp) engine but initially all that was available was a loaned and reconditioned Anzani 6 six cylinder radial which produced 34 kW (45 hp). It was mounted, uncowled in the nose. The fuselage had a rectangular section apart from the rounded upper decking and held two tandem cockpits, each wide enough to seat two side by side. The forward seats were under the wing and the other, seating the pilot, below the trailing edge. As on the Medwecki HL 2 the forward seats were entered via a car-type door with a special lock that maintained the integrity of the upper longeron; the cockpit, without the obstacle of the wing, could be entered over its side.

The M.N.3's empennage was conventional, with a triangular fin mounting an essentially rectangular rudder. Its tailplane was mounted near the top of the fuselage and was rigidly braced, though its angle of incidence was ground-adjustable. The elevators were divided to allow rudder movement. The fixed landing gear was also conventional, with mainwheels on a single axle supported on V-struts from the lower fuselage longerons below the wing strut joints. Rubber cords in the apexes of the V-struts acted as shock absorbers.

The first flight was made in late September 1928. Despite the lack of power it was able to carry three passengers and handled well. Without the passengers it could perform simple aerobatics. On the flight to the Second National Lightplane Contest in late October it suffered engine problems and had to make an emergency landing.

Though it was not seriously damaged in the landing, its designers decided to convert the M.N.3 into a two-seater, designated the M.N.4. Partly because they were busy working on their final joint design, the Medwecki and Nowakowski M.N.5, and partly because of the closure of Samolot, the conversion was not completed until 1932. The main improvement was replacement of the Anzani engine by a 45 kW (60 hp) Cirrus III upright four-cylinder, air-cooled inline. In addition, the front cockpit and the wing strut fairings were removed. These changes increased the empty weight by 34%. Its maximum speed was 148 km/h (92 mph; 80 kn), it could climb to 1,000 m (3,300 ft) in 4 min 20 s and had a service ceiling of 3,900 m (12,800 ft).

== Operational history ==
After obtaining its certificate of airworthiness the sole N.M.4 was used by the P.W.S. flying club for about a year, then moved to the Gdańsk club where it flew into the late 30s, participating in many meetings and regional and national competitions. In 1933 it competed in the Fifth National Lightplane Contest. Flown by Stefan Krynski, it came eleventh out of twenty-six.

== Variants ==
M.N.3
Four-seater with an Anzani 6 radial engine.

M.N.4
The M.N.3 modified into a two-seater with a Cirrus III inline engine.

== Operators (M.N.4) ==
- P.W.S. aeroclub
- Gdańsk aeroclub

== Specifications (M.N.3) ==
Data from Cynk (1971)

General characteristics

- Crew: One
- Capacity: Three passengers
- Length: 7.1 m (23 ft 4 in)
- Wingspan: 11 m (36 ft 1 in)
- Height: 2.25 m (7 ft 5 in)
- Wing area: 18.5 m^{2} (199 sq ft)
- Airfoil: Göttingen 655
- Empty weight: 355 kg (783 lb)
- Gross weight: 680 kg (1,499 lb)
- Powerplant: 1 × Anzani 6 6-cylinder radial engine, 34 kW (45 hp)
- Propellers: 2-bladed

Performance

- Cruise speed: 105 km/h (65 mph, 57 kn)
- Range: 300 km (190 mi, 160 nmi) fully loaded
- Landing speed: 58 km/h (36 mph; 31 kn)
