= PWS-6 =

Polish liaison aircraft

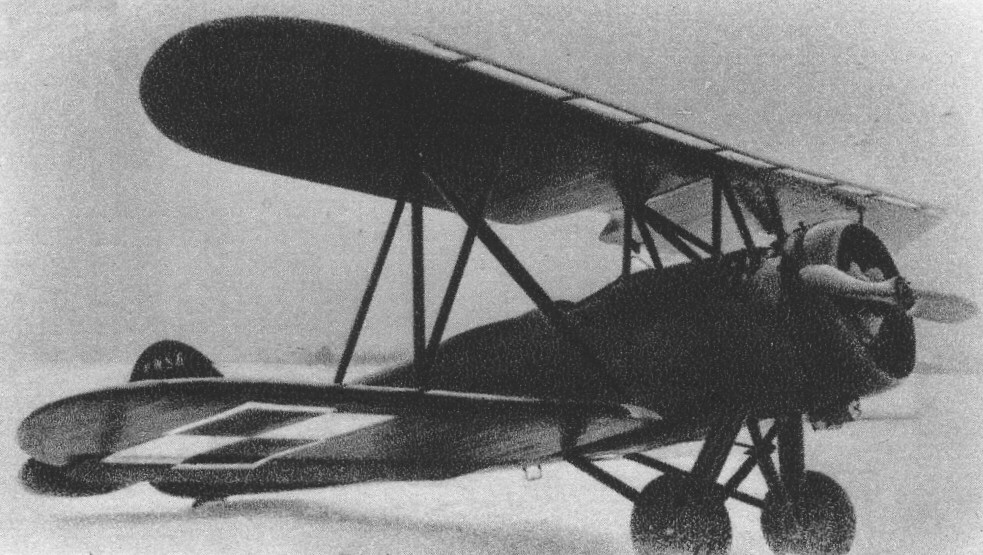

General information
- Type: Liaison aircraft
- Manufacturer: PWS
- Status: prototype
- Primary user: Polish Air Force
- Number built: 1

History
- First flight: 1930

The PWS-6, was a Polish liaison aircraft, developed in 1930 by the PWS (Podlaska Wytwórnia Samolotów – Podlasie Aircraft Factory), that remained a prototype.

== Design and development ==
The PWS-6 was a successor of an earlier liaison aircraft design, the PWS-5, which was not accepted for mass production. The designers, Aleksander Grzędzielewski and Augustyn Bobek-Zdaniewski, utilized the experience they had gained on PWS-11 and PWS-12 trainers, and as a result the new plane had improved aerodynamics, an oval shaped fuselage section and rounded wingtips. The layout of wings and their bracing were similar to the PWS-5, as was the engine and fixed undercarriage, while the front of the fuselage and the empennage was similar to a final variant of the PWS-12. It was the first Polish aircraft fitted with slats.

The design was produced in 1929–1930 and a scale-model of the aircraft was tested in the wind-tunnel. The prototype was built on the factory's own initiative and first flew in late 1930 in Biała Podlaska, piloted by Franciszek Rutkowski. In 1931 it was tested in the Aviation Technical Research Institute (ITBL) in Warsaw. It was evaluated as much better than the PWS-5, with better performance, good handling and a short landing. However, the aircraft was not produced, because the Polish Air Force had just ordered a production of the Lublin R-XIII aircraft.

The PWS-6 was a two-seater biplane of a wooden construction. A fuselage, oval in cross-section, was covered with canvas skin on a wooden frame, except the engine part, which was covered with aluminium sheets. The wings were two-spar, two-section, rectangular with rounded tips, covered with canvas and plywood (in front). Lower and upper wings halves had the same dimensions, therefore the upper wing had smaller span, lacking a central section. The upper wing was staggered forward, and connected with a lower wing by N-shaped struts and a slanted transverse strut, without wires. The empennage was of wooden construction, canvas covered.

The two-man crew sat in tandem in open cockpits. The rear observer's cockpit could be fitted with a ring machine gun mounting in case of serial production. The plane had a fixed, split axle conventional landing gear, with a rear skid. The fuel tank was located in the fuselage, in front of the cab. It had a maximum capacity of 210 L, but the normal capacity was 190 L.

The engine was a 9-cylinder Skoda-Wright Whirlwind J-5 air-cooled radial engine, built under licence in the Polish Skoda Works. Its nominal power was 220 hp, the take-off power was 240 hp. The engine had a Townend ring. The propeller was a wooden Szomański two-blade with a fixed pitch, although later a metal Ratier propeller with an adjustable-pitch was also tried. Cruise fuel consumption was 45–50 L/h.

== Specifications ==
Data from Polskie konstrukcje lotnicze 1893–1939, Polish aircraft 1893-1939

General characteristics

- Crew: 2
- Length: 6.98 m (22 ft 11 in)
- Wingspan: 9.6 m (31 ft 6 in)
- Height: 2.95 m (9 ft 8 in)
- Wing area: 25 m^{2} (270 sq ft)
- Airfoil: Bobek-Zdaniewski No.7
- Empty weight: 800 kg (1,764 lb)
- Gross weight: 1,175 kg (2,590 lb)
- Powerplant: 1 × Skoda-Wright J.5 Whirlwind 9-cylinder air-cooled radial piston engine, 160 kW (220 hp)
- Propellers: 2-bladed Szomański fixed-pitch or Ratier adjustable-pitch propellers

Performance

- Maximum speed: 186 km/h (116 mph, 100 kn) at sea level

179 km/h (111 mph; 97 kn) at 1,000 m (3,300 ft)

- Cruise speed: 160 km/h (99 mph, 86 kn)
- Stall speed: 70 km/h (43 mph, 38 kn)
- Range: 640 km (400 mi, 350 nmi)
- Service ceiling: 4,530 m (14,860 ft)
- Time to altitude: 3,000 m (9,800 ft) in 14 minutes 41 seconds
- Wing loading: 47 kg/m^{2} (9.6 lb/sq ft)
- Power/mass: 0.140 kW/kg (0.085 hp/lb)

Armament

- Guns: provision for 1x machine gun

== See also ==
Related development

- PWS-5
- PWS-12

Aircraft of comparable role, configuration, and era

- Lublin R-XII
