= HL-2 =

HL-2 may refer to:

- Half-Life 2, a computer game by Valve
- Medwecki HL 2 "Haroldek" - a 1927 Polish one-off light aircraft, built by Jozef Medwecki.
