= Offierski O.2 =

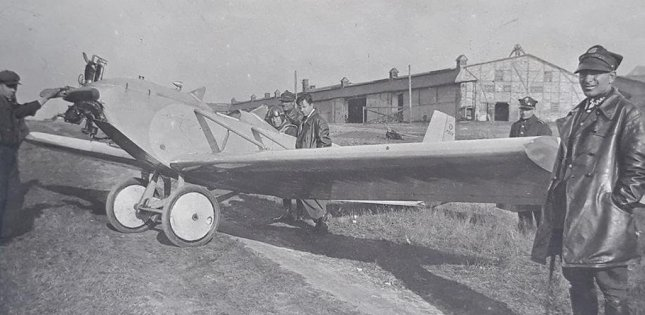

General information
- Type: Light aircraft
- National origin: Poland
- Designer: Michał Offierski
- Number built: 1

History
- First flight: September 1928

The Offierski O.2 was a one-off, two seat, low powered lightplane built in Poland on the late 1920s. It flew in 1928 but an old and unreliable engine prevented its development.

== Design and development ==
Light aircraft design was slow to start in Poland but from 1924 the Airborne and Antigas Defence League, generally known by their Polish acronym L.O.P.P., began to fund amateur builders. One of the first recipients was Jozef Medwecki, an aircraft designer with the Samolot company, who built the short-lived Medwecki HL 2. Michał Offierski, a colleague of his in the Samolot design office, also obtained L.O.P.P. funding and built the O.2; like the HL 2 it was a low power two-seater but had in contrast a low wing. Like Medewecki, Offierski built it in Samolot's factory in his spare time. He began in late 1927 after the demise of the ML 2, using its troublesome air-cooled 26 kW (35 hp) Anzani engine.

The O.2 had a two part, rectangular plan wing built around two spars and ply covered. The airfoil was aerodynamically semi-thick and the thickness was constant over the span. Each part was mounted on a lower fuselage longeron with light dihedral and braced to the upper longerons with pairs of parallel wooden struts to the spars. Ailerons filled over half the trailing edges.

Behind the engine the fuselage structure had a rectangular section. Apart from rounded decking, the ply covering was flat. There were two open cockpits in tandem, one between the wing bracing struts and the other just ahead of the trailing edge. The O.2 was provided with dual controls, with the instruments in the front cockpit visible from the rear. Fuel tanks were also in the fuselage.

The O.2's empennage was conventional. Its strut braced tailplane and separated, broad chord elevators were rectangular in plan and the vertical tail was straight-edged but tapered, with the rudder working between the elevators. Its fixed landing gear was also standard for the time, its mainwheels on a single axle with rubber cord shock absorbers, supported on V-struts from the lower fuselage longerons.

It was intended that the O.2 should compete in the Second National Lightplane Contest in late October 1928. The exact date of its first flight is unknown, though it managed a few flights in September and October. Its unreliable Anzani engine frustrated the O.2's development and prevented its participation in the Contest, after which it was abandoned.

== Specifications ==
Data from Cynk (1971) except where noted

General characteristics

- Crew: One
- Capacity: One passenger
- Length: 5.85 m (19 ft 2 in)
- Wingspan: 9.68 m (31 ft 9 in)
- Height: 2.0 m (6 ft 7 in)
- Wing area: 13.5 m^{2} (145 sq ft)
- Airfoil: Göttingen 648
- Empty weight: 220 kg (485 lb)
- Gross weight: 390 kg (860 lb)
- Powerplant: 1 × Anzani 3-cylinder air-cooled, 26 kW (35 hp)
- Propellers: 2-bladed

Performance

- Maximum speed: 125 km/h (78 mph, 67 kn)
- Cruise speed: 105 km/h (65 mph, 57 kn)
- Range: 200 km (120 mi, 110 nmi)
- Service ceiling: 2,300 m (7,500 ft)
- Rate of climb: 1.8 m/s (350 ft/min)
- Landing speed: 58 km/h (36 mph; 31 kn)
