= Bartel BM 6 =

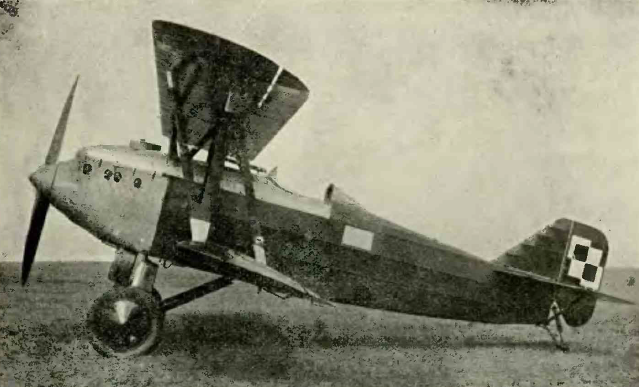

General information
- Type: Trainer aircraft
- Manufacturer: Samolot
- Status: Prototype
- Primary user: Polish Air Force
- Number built: 1

History
- First flight: 8 April 1930

The Bartel BM 6 was a Polish biplane trainer fighter aircraft of 1930. It did not advance beyond the prototype stage.

== Design and development ==
The aircraft was designed by Ryszard Bartel in the Samolot factory in Poznań, as a trainer-fighter plane. The BM-6 prototype, designated BM 6a, was flown on 8 April 1930 in Poznań. Its advantage was an easy construction and maintenance, according to Bartel's design philosophy. A distinguishing feature of all Bartels was an upper wing of a shorter span, because lower and upper wing halves were interchangeable (i.e. the lower wingspan included the fuselage width). It first introduced a mixed construction to Bartel's designs.

After trials, the prototype was modified in July 1930. The prototype was later redesignated BM 6a/II after it was substantially modified. It offered quite good flight characteristics and was capable of aerobatic flight. It was demonstrated in a fighter-plane competition in Bucharest in 1930, along with the similar PZL P.1.

The second prototype BM 6b, with a Wright Whirlwind 220 hp radial engine, was ordered, but work upon it ceased with closure of the Samolot factory in mid-1930. The PWS works, which inherited many of Samolot's projects, did not continue the project, for it had its own similar design, the PWS-11.

=== Description ===
Mixed construction biplane. Steel framed fuselage, rectangular in cross-section, canvas covered (engine and upper sections - aluminum covered). Rectangular two-spar wings with rounded ends, plywood and canvas covered. Upper wing span: 7.36 m, lower wing span: 8.10 m. Lower and upper wing halves were interchangeable. Single pilot, sitting in open cockpit, with a windshield. The V8 engine Hispano-Suiza 8Be was modified to lower power output (from 220 hp to 180 hp). Radiator below the fuselage. Fixed landing gear, with a rear skid. Two-blade wooden propeller of fixed pitch. Fuel tank in fuselage: 168 L capacity.

== Operational history ==
After state trials in 1931, the prototype was used in an advanced training school in Grudziądz, then in an aviation training center in Dęblin.

== Operators ==
Poland

- Polish Air Force (single prototype)

== Specifications (BM 6a) ==
Data from Polish Aircraft 1893–1939

General characteristics

- Crew: 1
- Length: 6.35 m (20 ft 10 in)
- Wingspan: 8.09 m (26 ft 7 in)
- Height: 2.8 m (9 ft 2 in)
- Wing area: 17.6 m^{2} (189 sq ft)
- Empty weight: 697 kg (1,537 lb)
- Gross weight: 985 kg (2,172 lb)
- Fuel capacity: 170 L (45 US gal; 37 imp gal)
- Powerplant: 1 × Hispano-Suiza 8Be V-8 water-cooled piston engine, 130 kW (180 hp)
- Propellers: 2-bladed Heine fixed pitch propeller

Performance

- Maximum speed: 194 km/h (121 mph, 105 kn) atsea level
- Never exceed speed: 420 km/h (260 mph, 230 kn)
- Service ceiling: 3,800 m (12,500 ft)
- Time to altitude: 4 minutes 24 seconds to 1,000 m (3,300 ft); 18 minutes 57 seconds to 3,000 m (9,800 ft)
- Wing loading: 56 kg/m^{2} (11 lb/sq ft)
- Power/mass: 0.138 kW/kg (0.084 hp/lb)

Armament

- Guns: 0.303 in (7.7 mm) Vickers machine gun in a fuselage, with a synchronising gear

== See also ==
Aircraft of comparable role, configuration, and era

- Bristol Bulldog
- Fiat CR.32
- Gloster Gladiator
- Polikarpov I-15
- PWS-11
