= Maryla =

Maryla may refer to:

- Maryla Jonas (1911–1959), Polish classical pianist
- Maryla Rodowicz, stage name of Polish singer and actress Maria Antonina Rodowicz (born 1945)
- Maryla Szymiczkowa, pen name of Polish poet, writer, translator and painter Jacek Maria Dehnel (born 1980) and his partner Piotr Tarczynski
- Maryla Wolska (1873–1930), Polish poet of the Young Poland movement
- Bartel BM 1 Maryla, a 1925 Polish military fighter design that was never built
