= Bartel BM 2 =

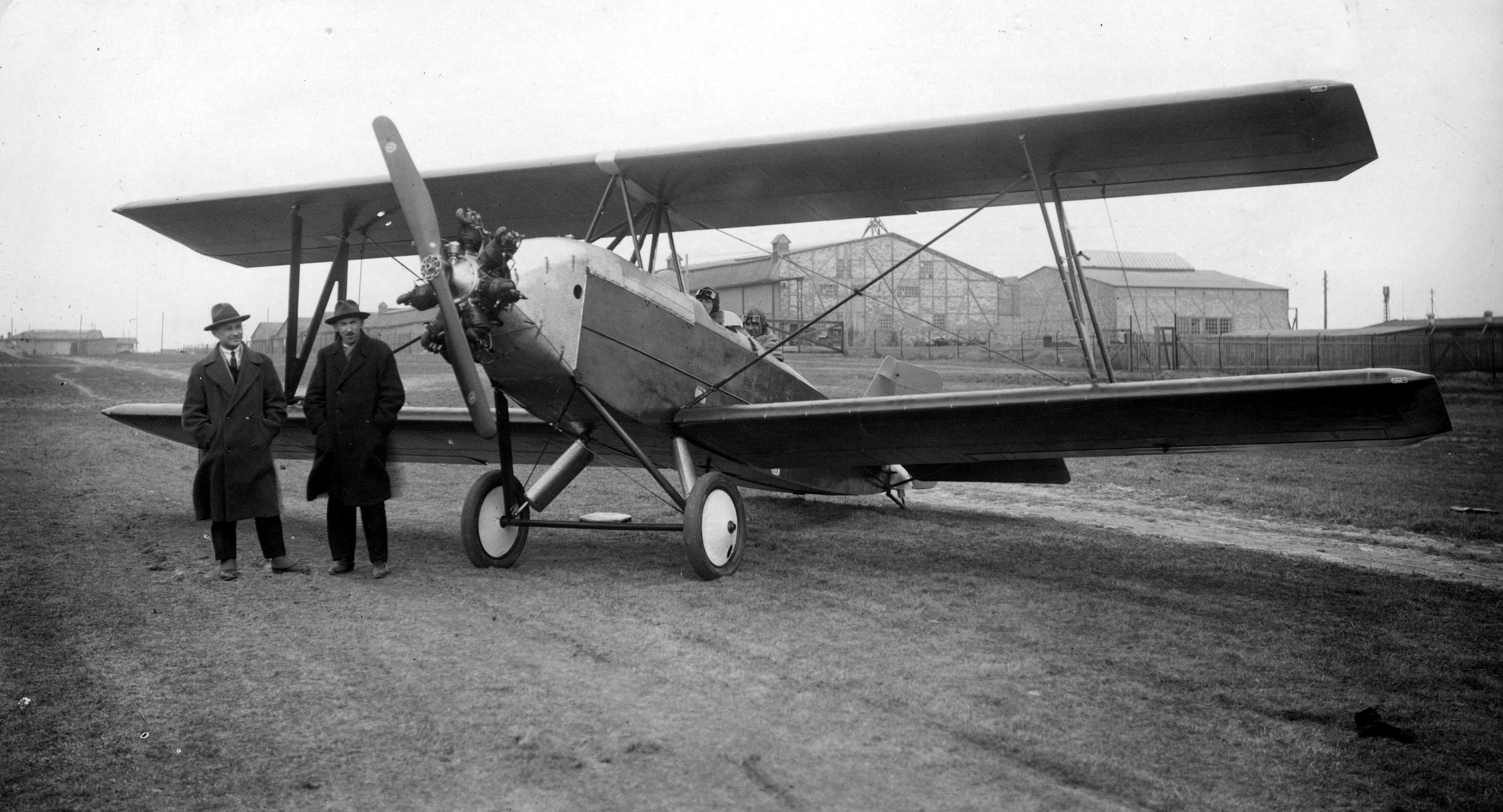

General information
- Type: Primary trainer aircraft
- Manufacturer: Samolot
- Designer: Ryszard Bartel
- Status: Prototype
- Number built: 1

History
- First flight: 7 December 1926

The Bartel BM 2, originally Bartel M.2 was a Polish biplane primary trainer aircraft prototype of 1926.

== Design and development ==
The aircraft was designed by Ryszard Bartel, a chief designer of Samolot factory in Poznań. It was the first Polish design of a trainer plane. Initially it was known as Bartel M.2, then BM 2 (M was for designer's wife Maryla). The prototype was flown on 7 December 1926 in Poznań. In June 1927 it was shown at the first Aviation Exhibition in Warsaw. It was tested in 1927 and evaluated as quite good, but it was not built in series, because Bartel decided to design an improved aircraft, which resulted in the Bartel BM 4 trainer, which was produced in quantity. After flight testing, the prototype was removed from service.

A distinguishing feature of the BM 2 and all Bartels was an upper wing of a shorter span, because the lower and upper wing halves were interchangeable (i.e. the lower wingspan included the width of the fuselage). Also Bartel put a stress on standardizing the construction materials used: steel pipes, metal sheet etc., in order to make production and repairs easier. A distinguishing feature of the BM 2 was the upper wing directly over the lower wing - unstaggered wings, while in later Bartel designs, the wings incorporate forward stagger - where the upper wing is mounted ahead of the lower wing.

=== Description ===
Wooden construction biplane, conventional in layout. Fuselage rectangular in cross-section, plywood-covered (engine section - metal covered). Rectangular two-spar wings, plywood- and canvas-covered. Crew of two, sitting in tandem in open cockpits, with individual windshields. Cockpits with twin controls, the instructor seated aft. Fixed landing gear, with a rear skid (main gear with a common axle, sprung with a rubber rope). Radial engine in the fuselage nose, without a cowling.

== Specifications ==
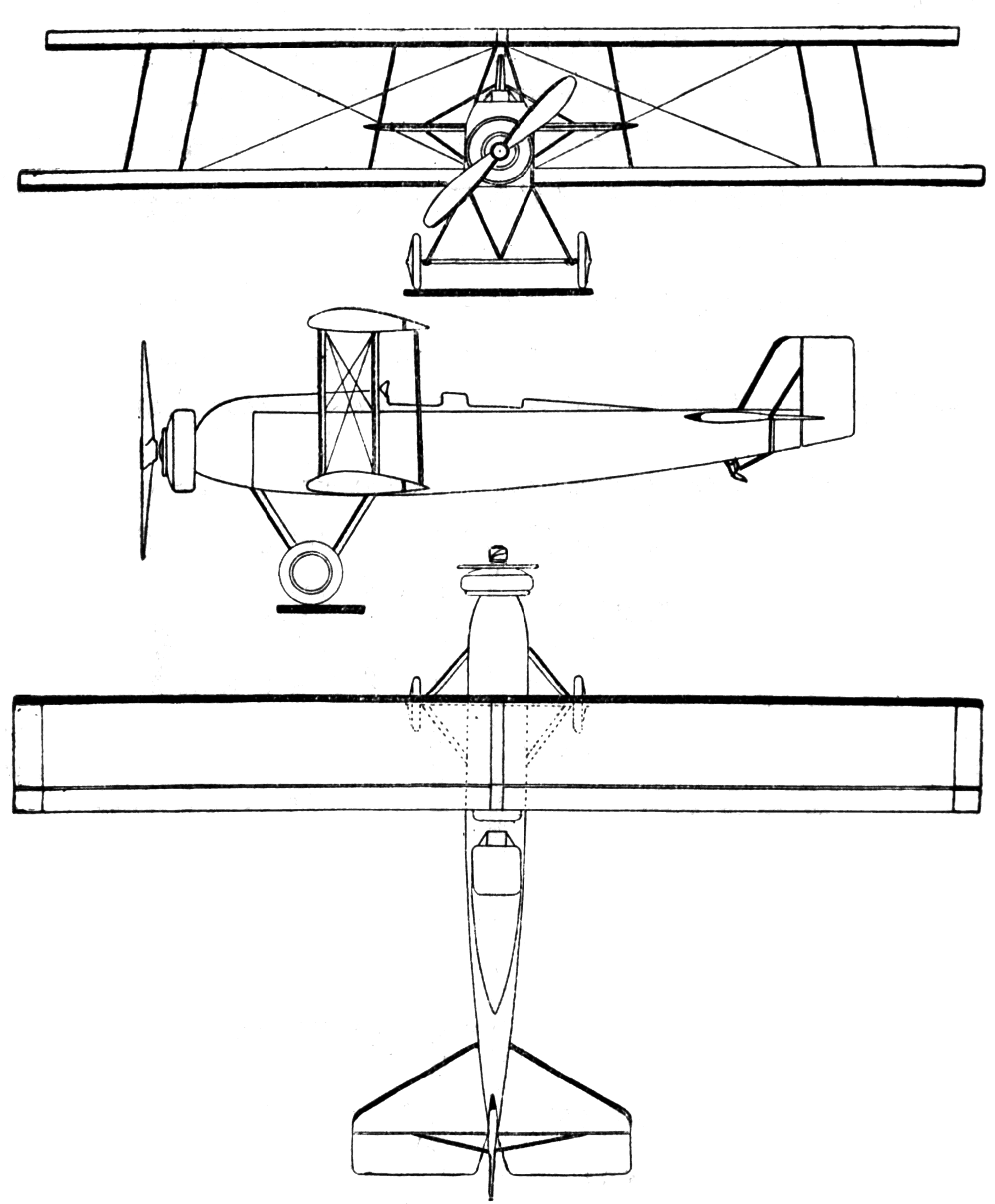
Bartel M.2 3-view drawing from Les Ailes March 17, 1927

Data from Jane's all the World's Aircraft 1928, Polish Aircraft 1893–1939

General characteristics

- Crew: 2
- Length: 7.8 m (25 ft 7 in)
- Wingspan: 11.77 m (38 ft 7 in)
- Height: 3.08 m (10 ft 1 in)
- Wing area: 28.6 m^{2} (308 sq ft)
- Aspect ratio: 8.5
- Airfoil: Bartel 37/IIa
- Empty weight: 695 kg (1,532 lb)
- Gross weight: 970 kg (2,138 lb)
- Fuel capacity: 130 L (34 US gal; 29 imp gal) in two centre-section tanks; 16 L (4.2 US gal; 3.5 imp gal) oil
- Powerplant: 1 × Salmson 9AC 9-cylinder air-cooled radial piston engine, 89 kW (120 hp)
- Propellers: 2-bladed wooden fixed-pitch propeller, 2.24 m (7 ft 4 in) diameter

Performance

- Maximum speed: 130 km/h (81 mph, 70 kn)
- Landing speed: 65 km/h (40 mph; 35 kn)
- Cruise speed: 100 km/h (62 mph, 54 kn)
- Stall speed: 65 km/h (40 mph, 35 kn)
- Range: 320 km (200 mi, 170 nmi)
- Service ceiling: 4,000 m (13,000 ft)
- Rate of climb: 2.9 m/s (570 ft/min)
- Time to altitude: 1,000 m (3,300 ft) in 7 minutes
- Wing loading: 33.8 kg/m^{2} (6.9 lb/sq ft)
- Power/mass: 0.092 kW/kg (0.056 hp/lb)
- Fuel consumption: 34 L/h (9.0 gal/h; 7.5 imp gal/h)

== See also ==
Related development

- Bartel BM-4
- Bartel BM-5

== Bibliography ==
- Nelcarz, Bartolomiej & Peczkowski, Robert (2001). White Eagles: The Aircraft, Men and Operations of the Polish Air Force 1918–1939. Ottringham, UK: Hikoki Publications. ISBN 1-902109-73-2.
