= Samolot =

Polish aircraft manufacturer

Wielkopolska Wytwórnia Samolotów Samolot
- Industry: Aerospace
- Founded: 11 August 1923
- Defunct: 1930
- Fate: Liquidated
- Headquarters: Poznań, Poland
- Key people: Ryszard Bartel

Samolot (full name: Wielkopolska Wytwórnia Samolotów Samolot S.A.) was the Polish aerospace manufacturer, located in Poznań and active between 1924 and 1930. It manufactured among others aircraft under the Bartel name. The name Samolot itself simply means airplane in Polish.

== History ==
The WWS Samolot was created on 11 August 1923 in Poznań, and the factory was opened on 24 April 1924. It was located on Ławica airfield in Poznań. The factory first produced licence copies of the French trainer planes Hanriot H.28 (144 built in 1925-1926) and Hanriot HD.19 (80 built in 1925-1928, as H-19) for the Polish Air Force. It developed an air ambulance variant of H.28 - H.28S (16 were built in 1927-1928).

In 1925 there was developed an own design of sports plane Sp-I (one built). From 1926, Ryszard Bartel led its construction bureau and started to design trainer aircraft for the Polish Air Force. After a single Bartel BM-2, a series of 22 Bartel BM-4 was built in 1928 (it was the first aircraft of the Polish design built in series). In 1928-1929 there was built a series of 60 trainers Bartel BM-5. The last design was a trainer fighter Bartel BM-6, flown in 1930, that remained a prototype.

Apart from designing work of Bartel, several designers built prototypes of their sportsplanes (HL-2, MN-3, MN-5, O-2) or gliders in Samolot factory, but they were not built in series. From 1927 it also produced car bodies on imported chassises, mostly buses, Ford A30 cars and luxury cars.

In 1930, due to a damage by fire (12 September 1929) and lack of orders, the factory Samolot became liquidated. Its machinery was bought by PZL. The Bartel BM-4 development was taken over by the PWS.

== Aircraft ==
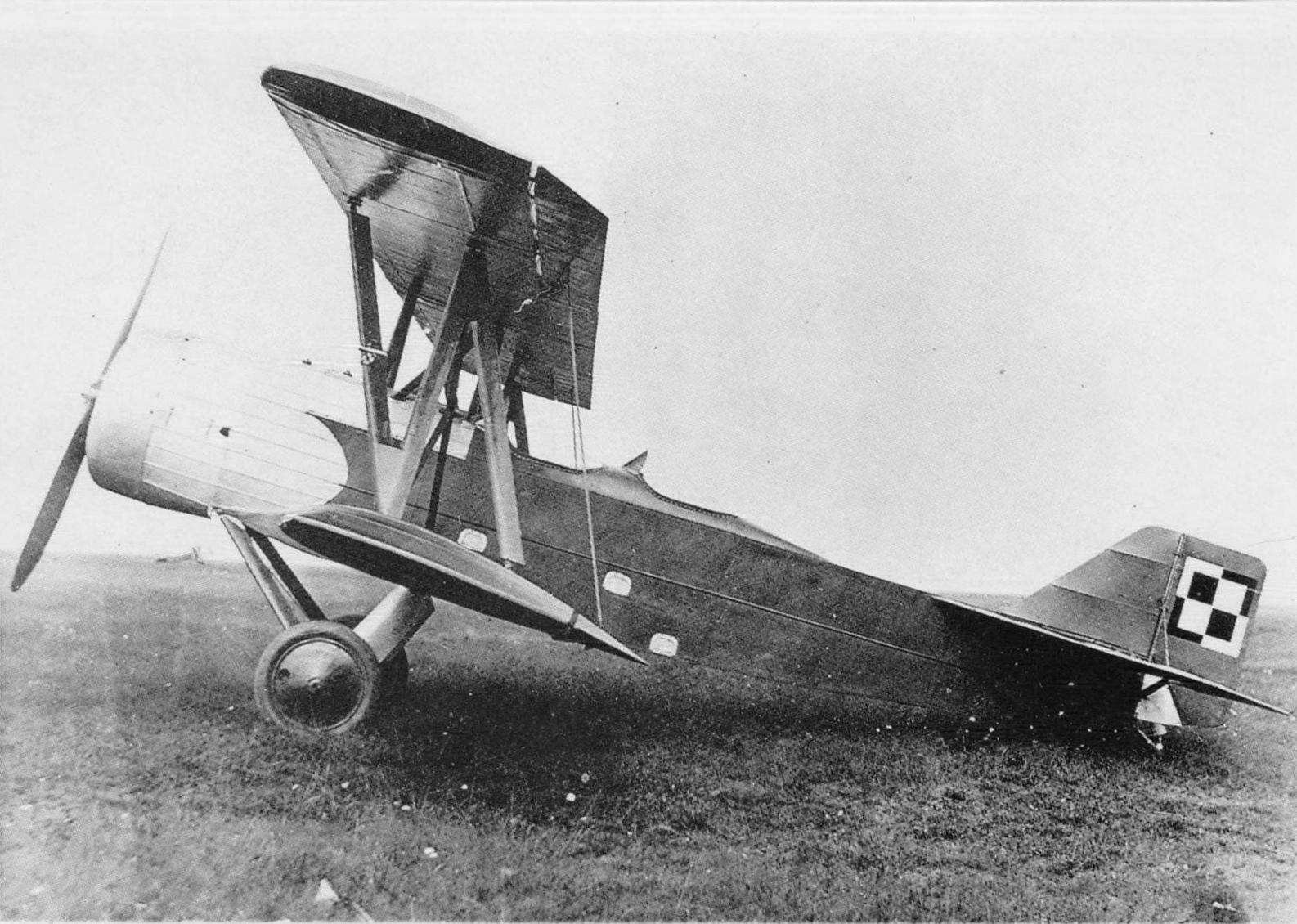
BM-4

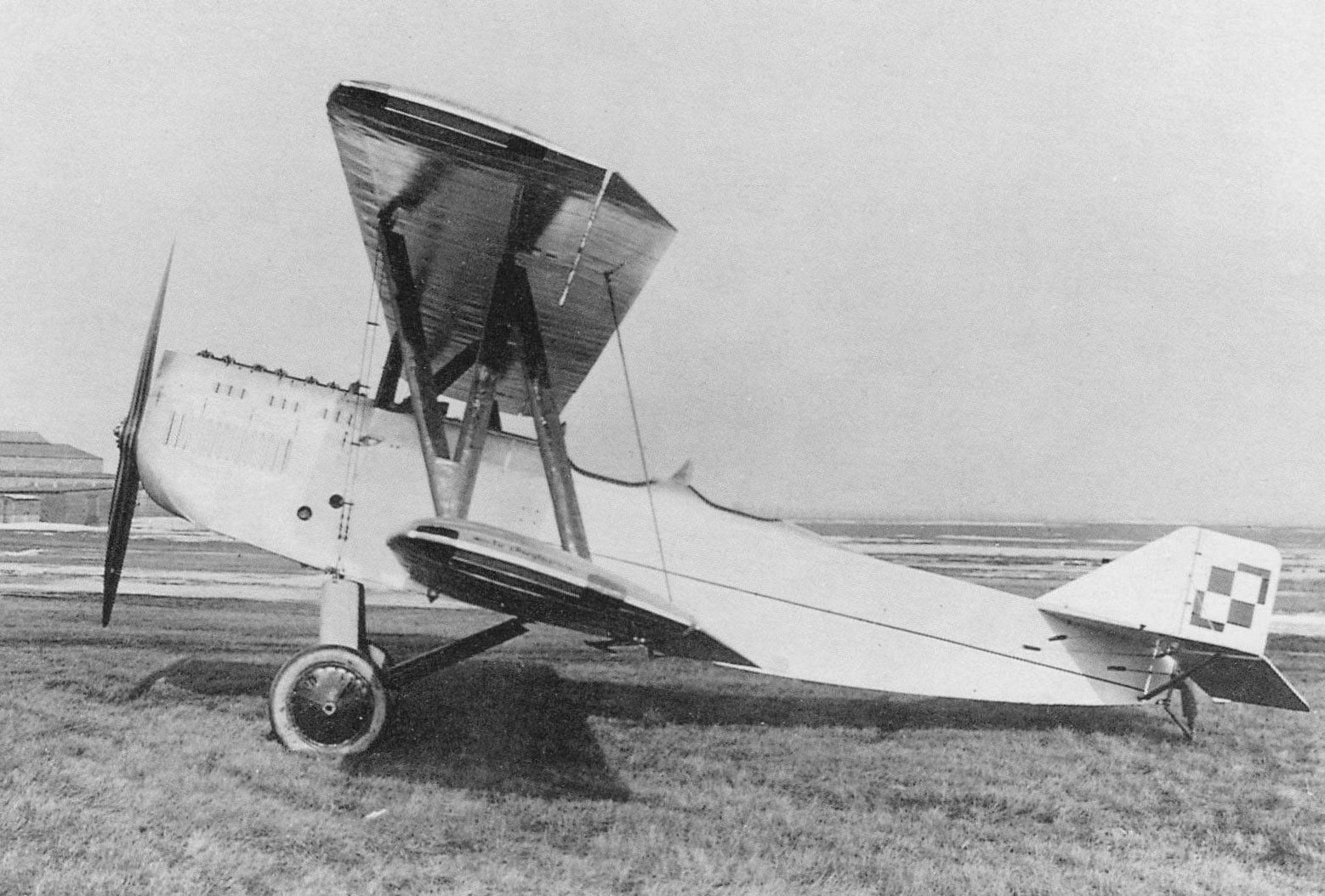
BM-5

Model name	First flight	Number built	Type
Samolot Sp.I	1926	1	Single engine monoplane experimental airplane
Bartel BM-1	N/A	0	Unbuilt single engine monoplane fighter
Bartel BM-2	1926	1	Single engine biplane trainer
Medwecki HL 2	1927	1	Single engine monoplane sport airplane
Bartel BM-4	1927	~75	Single engine biplane trainer
Bartel BM-5	1928	62	Single engine biplane trainer
Offierski O.2	1928	1	Single engine monoplane sport airplane
Medwecki and Nowakowski M.N.2	N/A	0	Twin engine monoplane bomber
Medwecki and Nowakowski M.N.3	1928	1	Single engine monoplane sport airplane
Bartel BM-6	1930	1	Single engine biplane trainer
Medwecki and Nowakowski M.N.5	1930	1	Single engine biplane sport airplane
Medwecki and Nowakowski M.N.4	1933	1	Single engine monoplane sport airplane
