= Samolot Sp.I =

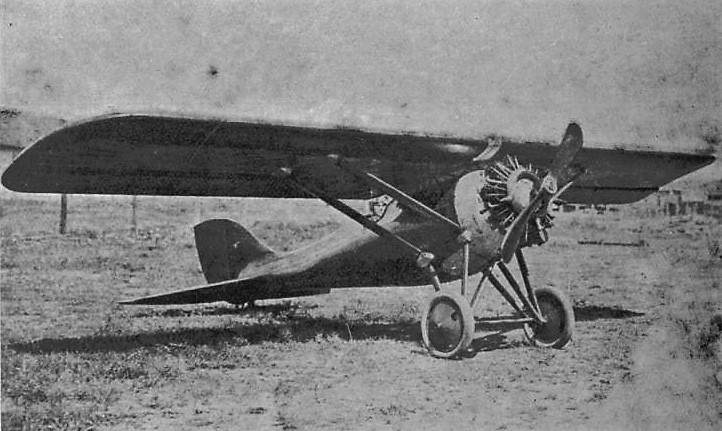

General information
- Type: Single seat research aircraft
- National origin: Poland
- Manufacturer: Samolot
- Designer: Piotr Tulacz
- Number built: 1

History
- First flight: July 1926

Samolot Sp.I was a type of aircraft designed in Poland in the mid-1920s. It was intended to explore the characteristics of a proposed single seat fighter. The project did not receive government support and only one Sp.I was built.

== Design and development ==
The designer of the Samolot Sp.I was Piotr Tulacz, the technical director of Samolot. A private venture, it was intended to be a research development vehicle for a more powerful fighter aircraft and, in addition, to demonstrate to the Government that high performance aircraft could be built with Polish materials.

The Samolot Sp.I was a braced parasol wing monoplane. Its two-part wing, rectangular in plan apart from blunted tips, was moderately thick. Each half-wing was built around a pair of wooden spars and was covered with plywood, then joined centrally and supported just above the fuselage on cabane struts. Primary wing bracing was provided on each side by a parallel pair of steel struts, enclosed in wooden streamlined cladding, from the lower fuselage to the wing spars.

It had been designed to accept radial engines in the 60–89 kW (80–120 hp) power range and when the Sp.I was completed in the mid-1926 the only available engine was an elderly six-cylinder Anzani 6A-4 which gave 67 kW (90 hp). This was housed under a circular cross-section metal cowling with its cylinder heads protruding for cooling. The cowling blended smoothly into the rest of the fuselage which was a 2 mm (0.08 in) thick ply-skinned semi-monocoque, tapering to the rear. The pilot's open cockpit was just behind the trailing edge of the wing, where there was a small cut-out to improve his field of view. The Sp.I's tailplane and fin were integral parts of the fuselage and also ply covered, as were the control surfaces; the elevators were divided.

The Sp.I had a conventional, fixed undercarriage with a track of 1.50 m (4 ft 11 in). The mainwheels were on a single axle with rubber-cord shock absorbers, mounted on steel V struts from the fuselage at the base of the wing struts. These struts, like the wing bracing, were clad in wood streamlining.

The first flight, flown by Samolot's chief test-pilot Edmond Holodynski at Poznań-Lawica, was in July 1926. Further flight-testing showed a lack of power but also some handling problems and instabilities. The latter were soon corrected by a reduction in fuselage length and some rudder modifications and the aircraft was re-engined with a 89 kW (120 hp) Salmson 9Ac, a nine-cylinder modern radial. As a result, the Sp.I handled well and bettered its calculated performance.

Despite its good performance, Samolot failed to get Government funding and Sp.I development was abandoned. It did leave a legacy, in that some of the engineers who had worked on its design subsequently joined the design team of the successful PWS-10, another braced parasol wing aircraft.

== Specifications (Salmson engine) ==
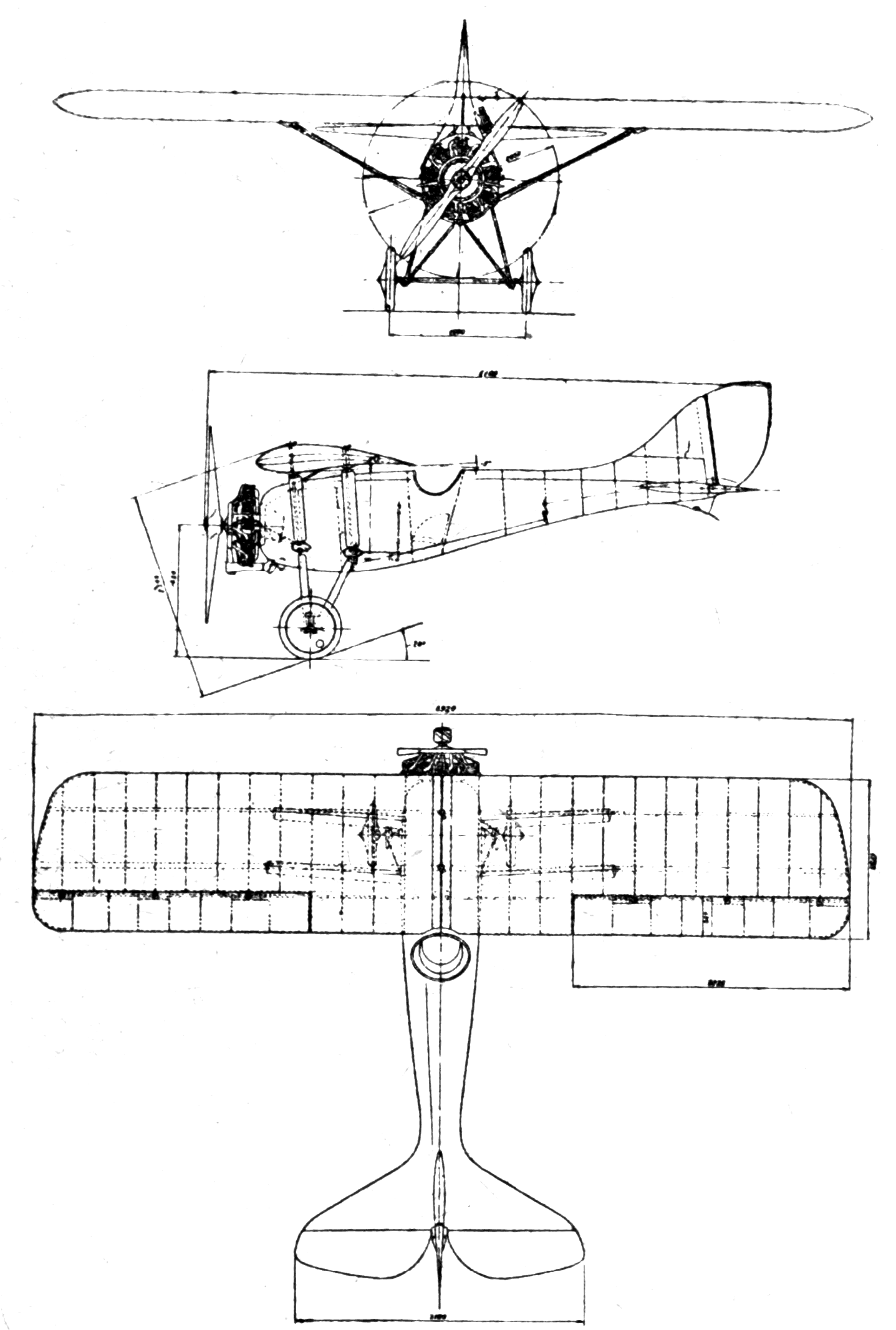
Samolot Sp.I 3-view drawing from L'Air October 15,1926

Data from Cynk (1971)

General characteristics

- Crew: One
- Length: 6.1 m (20 ft 0 in)
- Wingspan: 8.92 m (29 ft 3 in)
- Height: 2.3 m (7 ft 7 in)
- Wing area: 15 m^{2} (160 sq ft)
- Airfoil: Dewoitine 26A
- Empty weight: 530 kg (1,168 lb)
- Gross weight: 715 kg (1,576 lb)
- Fuel capacity: 130 L (29 imp gal; 34 US gal)
- Powerplant: 1 × Salmson 9AC 9-cylinder, air-cooled radial, 89 kW (120 hp)
- Propellers: 2-bladed

Performance

- Maximum speed: 190 km/h (120 mph, 100 kn)
- Landing speed: 60 km/h (37 mph; 32 kn)
