= Ryszard Bartel =

Polish engineer, aircraft designer and aviator

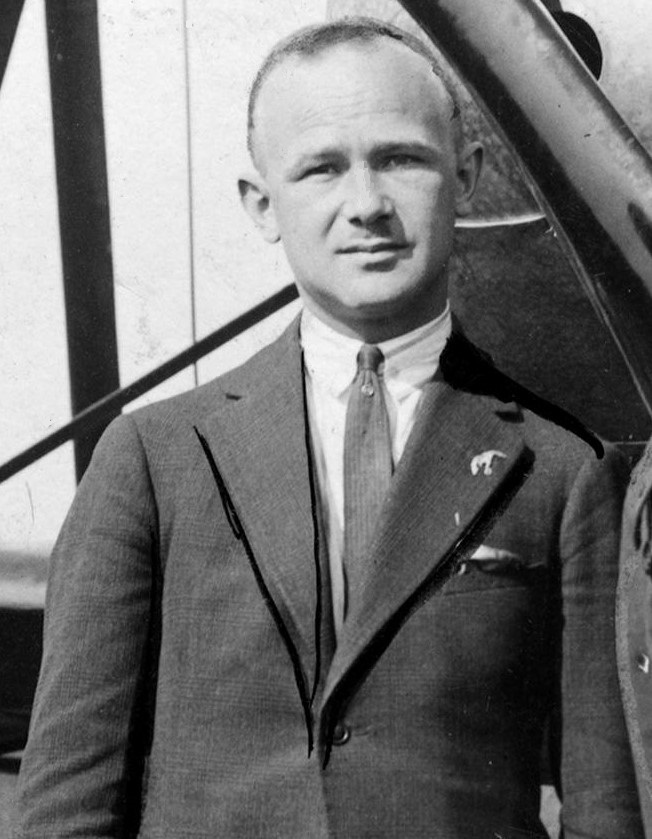
- Born: 22 March 1897
- Died: 3 April 1982 (aged 85)

Ryszard Bartel (22 March 1897 – 3 April 1982) was a Polish engineer, aircraft designer and aviator, one of Poland's aviation pioneers.

== Life and career ==
Bartel was born in Sławniów village near Pilica. He was interested in aviation from his youth, and in 1911 he built his own gliders capable of short flights. In 1916, he enrolled in the Warsaw University of Technology, being one of three founders of the Aviation Section of that university's Students' Mechanical Club. In 1917, he completed a pilot course, and he joined the underground aviator organization (Warsaw was under German occupation at that time). In 1918, after Poland regained its independence, he volunteered for the Polish Air Force. He completed further military flying courses and he took part in the Polish-Soviet War, flying Breguet 14s in the 16th Reconnaissance Squadron and in the Central Lithuanian Air Squadron. He was demobilized in December 1920, and graduated from the Warsaw University of Technology in 1924 as an Engineer. He also took second place in the first Polish soaring competition in 1923.

In 1925, his design of the Bartel BM-1 Maryla fighter aircraft received an award in the first Polish contest for military aircraft, but the design was not built. In 1924-1926 he worked in France, supervising production of aircraft for Poland and he also undertook research on aerodynamics there. From 1926, he was a chief designer of the Samolot aircraft manufacturer in Poznań. He designed and built there a prototype of a trainer aircraft, the Bartel BM-2 (1926), then trainers Bartel BM-4 (1927) and Bartel BM-5 (1928), built in small series for the Polish Air Force (the BM-4 was Poland's first domestic design that was put into production).

From 1930 he worked in the Aviation Department of the Polish War Ministry, then, from 1932 to 1937, in the PZL aircraft works in Warsaw, which had obtained several of the Samolot projects upon that company's closure. His duties included overseeing aircraft production. During 1937-1939 he was a technical director for the Lubelska Wytwórnia Samolotów (LWS) works and supervised licensing some Polish designs to Romania and Turkey. During World War II he stayed in Poland and worked under the German occupation as a teacher in technical schools.

After Poland's liberation in 1945, Bartel worked in the Polish Civil Aviation Department of Ministry of Communication, but in 1948, with the advent of Stalinism in Poland, the communist authorities removed him from work in aviation, along with many other pre-war experts. He worked among other places in the Polish Normalization Institute. From 1951 he was a professor at the Warsaw University of Technology. He retired in 1966. From the 1960s, his passion became the history of the Polish aviation industry. He was active in aviation associations such as the Polish Aero Club.

He received the Knight's Cross of the Polonia Restituta and the Polish Cross of Merit (silver in 1927, gold in 1948). Bartel also held a Field Pilot Badge (1922).

== List of aircraft designs ==
- Bartel BM-1 (1925) Single-seat single-engine parasol-wing fighter aircraft design. Not constructed
- Bartel BM-2 (1926) Two-seat single-engine biplane trainer aircraft design. One prototype was constructed
- Bartel BM-3 (1926) Two-seat single-engine advanced trainer aircraft design. Not constructed
- Bartel BM-4 (1927) Two-seat single-engine trainer aircraft design. Constructed in quantity
- Bartel BM-5 (1928) Two-seat single-engine advanced trainer aircraft design, a development of the BM-4. Constructed in quantity
- Bartel BM-6 (1930) Two-seat single-engine advanced trainer aircraft design. Two prototypes were constructed

== Sources ==
- Jerzy R. Konieczny, Tadeusz Malinowski: "Mała encyklopedia lotników polskich - Tomik II" (Small encyclopaedia of Polish aviators, II), WKił, Warszawa 1988, ISBN 83-206-0734-5 (in Polish).
- Ryszard Bartel web page (in Polish).
