= Sido S.1 =

Sido 1
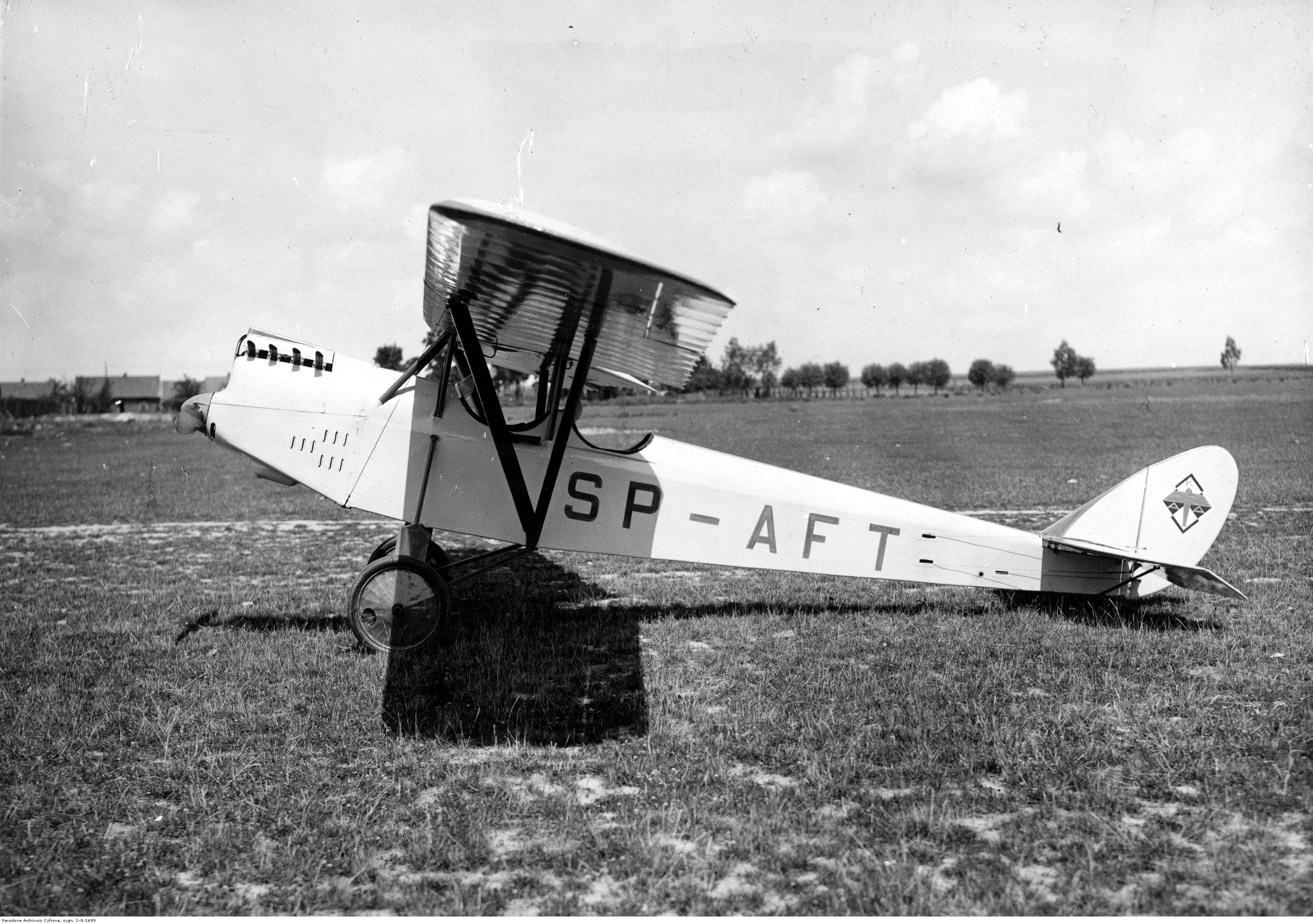

General information
- Type: Trainer aircraft
- National origin: Poland
- Designer: Józef Sido
- Number built: 6

History
- First flight: late July 1930

The Sido S.1 was a Polish two seat, parasol wing trainer aircraft, first flown in 1930.

== Design and development ==
In the late 1920s the LOPP issued a requirement for a low cost, 60 kW (80 hp) club trainer. In 1929 the Sido S.1 was designed in response by the amateur Józef Sido, who was a student at the Mining Academy in Kraków. Positive reactions from both LOPP and the Kraków Academic Aeroclub led to the parallel construction of three airframes in the workshops of the local Air Regiment, differing primarily in their engines. The first, powered by a 63 kW (85 hp) Cirrus III inline, flew for the first time on ether 21 or 28 July 1930. The second airframe flew in September 1930, initially known as the S.2 and fitted with a 60 kW (80 hp) Avia W.Z.7, a Polish seven cylinder radial engine. The third, initially known as the S.3, had the Cirrus engine but had modified the wing bracing struts and undercarriage. In the late summer of 1931 the two later aircraft were modified to the standards and engine of the S.1 and were referred to by that designation.

The wooden parasol wing of the Sido S.1 was built in two parts. Each had two spars, plywood skinned leading edges and was fabric covered. In plan the wing was straight tapered and its section varied outboard from S.T.Ae 74 to Göttingen Gö 398. Each halfwing was joined to the lower fuselage longerons with V-struts to the spars and the centre section, formed from the fuel tank, was held well above the fuselage on steel tube struts to the upper fuselage.

Its flat-sided fuselage was built around a steel tube structure and fabric covered apart from plywood decking. There were two open, tandem cockpits equipped with dual control. The upward field of view from the rear cockpit was improved with a wide, rounded, trailing edge cut-out and access to the front cockpit with a starboard-side door. The S.1 had a triangular fin and a large rudder with a leading edge that extended the straight edge of the fin but with a full, rounded trailing edge down to the keel. The tailplane was mounted on top of the fuselage, strut braced from below, and the elevators had a cut-out for rudder movement.

The S.1 had conventional, fixed landing gear. Each maninwheel was on a half-axle hinged from the lower fuselage longeron, as was the radius arm. The landing leg, which incorporated a compressed rubber shock absorber, was hinged from the upper longeron.

== Operational history ==
The Polish military aviation authorities considered the S.1 alongside the PZL.5 and the M.N.5 for their trainer requirements. Despite its good performance, the lack of an established manufacturing facility for this amateur design prevented its military adoption. There was more enthusiasm from the civilian aeroclubs and a series of five airframes, designated S.1bis Z, powered by the Avia engine in a Townend ring cowling and fitted with streamlined wing struts, was begun in the newly established Central Aeroclubs' Workshops (C.W.A.). C.W.A went bankrupt after producing only three, the last of which had a 60 kW (80 hp) Siemens-Halske Sh 11 radial.

The S.1s was a frequent competitor in Polish meetings, including the National Lightplane Contests and many local and regional meetings and rallies through the early 1930s, though without major successes. It also served as a reliable and forgiving club trainer, the small production numbers reflecting the failure to find an established constructor for the aircraft rather than its qualities. One remained in use until 1939 and may have been evacuated to Romania.

== Variants ==
S.1
First prototype, Cirrus engine.
S.2
Second prototype, Avia engine. Later re-engined with Cirrus and re-designate S.1.
S.3
Third prototype, Cirrus engine. Later re-designated S.1.
S.1 bis Z
Three built, the first two with Avia engines and the last with a Siemens.

== Specifications (S.1) ==
Data from J. Cynk (1971)

General characteristics

- Crew: Two
- Length: 7.8 m (25 ft 7 in)
- Wingspan: 11.4 m (37 ft 5 in)
- Height: 2.5 m (8 ft 2 in)
- Wing area: 17 m^{2} (180 sq ft)
- Empty weight: 456 kg (1,005 lb)
- Gross weight: 700 kg (1,543 lb)
- Powerplant: 1 × Cirrus III air-cooled 4-cylinder inline, 63 kW (85 hp)

Performance

- Maximum speed: 170 km/h (110 mph, 92 kn) at sea level
- Cruise speed: 140 km/h (87 mph, 76 kn)
- Range: 700 km (430 mi, 380 nmi)
- Service ceiling: 4,500 m (14,800 ft)
- Time to altitude: 6 min to 1,000 m (3,300 ft)
- 'Take-off run: 90 m (300 ft)
- Landing speed: 60 km/h (37 mph)
