= Medwecki and Nowakowski M.N.5 =

M.N.5
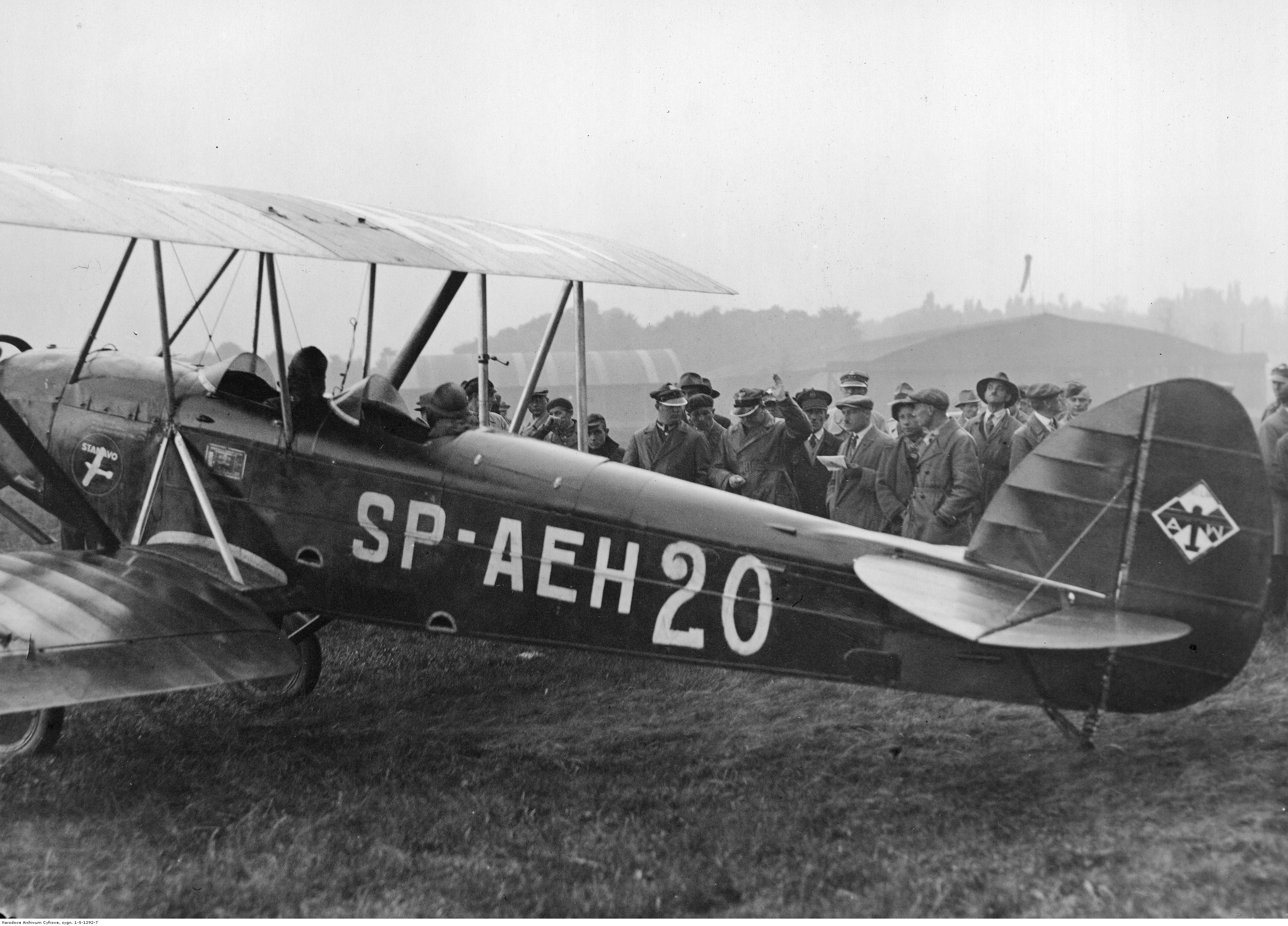

General information
- Type: Civil trainer aircraft
- National origin: Poland
- Designer: Józef Medwecki and Zygmund Nowakowski
- Number built: 1

History
- First flight: 21 August 1930

The Medwecki and Nowakowski M.N.5 was an economical Polish trainer aircraft initially aimed at the club market, though there was also some military interest. It performed well but lacked a constructor after Samolot became insolvent in 1930, so only one was completed.

== Design and development ==
The increasing number of Polish aeroclubs in the early 1930s called for a suitable training aircraft. LOPP, the group that encouraged Polish air-mindedness put out a call for suitable designs, powered by a 60 kW (80 hp) engine, that would be cheap to buy and to run. Three designs received development contracts, the PZL 5, the Sido S.1 and the M.N.5. The latter was designed by Józef Medwecki and Zygmund Nowakowski, both of whom worked for Samolot. With the company's help, two M.N.5 airframes were built, one for static load testing and the other for flight.

The wood-framed M.N.5 was a single bay biplane with stagger and a large interplane gap to ease cockpit access. The equal span upper and lower wings were both in two parts with rectangular plans out to blunted tips. They were built around pairs of spars and largely covered with fabric, together with some plywood. Upper and lower wings were braced together with conventional N-form interplane struts but in addition a long steel tube strut, larger in diameter than the others, ran in the plane of the forward spars from the top of the interplane strut down to the lower spar just outboard of the root. As well as replacing flying wires, this strut supported the leading edge of the lower wing when the wings were disconnected from the root and folded back alongside the fuselage, hinging on the rear spars. The wing root was strengthened by an inverted V-strut from its spars to the upper fuselage longeron. The upper centre section was formed by an aerofoil section fuel tank, held over the upper fuselage by three pairs of struts, the forward-most leaning rearwards to the forward spar and the others, in parallel, outwards to the rear spars. Only the lower wing was mounted with dihedral; it also carried the M.N.5's full span, narrow chord ailerons. With wings folded, the M.N.5 was 3 m (9 ft 10 in) wide.

The M.N.5 was powered by a 60 kW (80 hp) Armstrong Siddeley Genet five-cylinder radial engine enclosed by a Townend ring. The mostly wooden fuselage had four longerons connected by frames, though the forward part was reinforced with steel tubes. Its covering, including rounded decking, was plywood. There were two cockpits in tandem, fitted with dual control. The instructor sat in front under the wing and the student just aft of the trailing edge. Behind the pupil's cockpit there was a third seat under a detachable ply cover.

Its curved and slightly pointed empennage was steel-framed and fabric-covered with a rudder that extended down to the keel. The tailplane's angle of incidence could be adjusted in flight. There were separate elevators, each identical to each other and to the rudder, keeping costs down.

The M.N.5 had a wide track, divided undercarriage with mainwheels on cranked half-axles hinged from the fuselage underside centreline; a Vickers oleo strut from the stub wing and a radius arm formed a V-strut on each side. Its short tailskid had a vertical, rubber cord shock absorber.

It flew for the first time on 21 August 1932 from Poznań-Ławica. Early testing revealed some stability problems which were overcome by moving the engine forward 300 mm (11.8 in) in a longer nose.

The M.N.5 was then flown by both civil and service pilots, who remarked on its good handling and manoeuvrability. The Department of Aeronautics, looking for a replacement for its Hanriots, was enthusiastic and the construction of a second prototype to speed development was proposed. Unfortunately, as Samolot was in the process of liquidation, another builder had to be found. The Ministry proposed PZL who were developing the PZL 5 and showed no interest in helping a competitor, so no more N.M.5s were built.

== Operational history ==
The lone example was bought by the Vilnius aeroclub in 1931 and, registered as SP-AEH, served them for many years. It took part in many rallies and competed in regional and national championships.

== Specifications ==
Data from Cynk (1971)

General characteristics

- Crew: One pilot
- Capacity: One or two passengers/pupil
- Length: 7.3 m (23 ft 11 in) (initially 7.0 m (23 ft 0 in))
- Wingspan: 9 m (29 ft 6 in)
- Height: 2.85 m (9 ft 4 in)
- Wing area: 23 m^{2} (250 sq ft)
- Airfoil: Göttingen 593
- Empty weight: 410 kg (904 lb)
- Gross weight: 780 kg (1,720 lb)
- Powerplant: 1 × Armstrong Siddeley Genet I 5-cxylinder radial, 60 kW (80 hp)
- Propellers: 2-bladed

Performance

- Maximum speed: 145 km/h (90 mph, 78 kn) at sea level
- Cruise speed: 110 km/h (68 mph, 59 kn)
- Endurance: 4 hr
- Service ceiling: 4,800 m (15,700 ft)
- Landing speed: 65 km/h (40 mph; 35 kn)
