= Riverine Air Squadron (Poland) =

Former Polish military unit

Riverine Air Escadrille (Polish: Rzeczna Eskadra Lotnicza) was a unit of the Polish Air Force between the wars. The unit was formed in 1920 as the Riverine Air Platoon (Rzeczny Pluton Lotniczy) and was based at Pińsk. The main aircraft operated were 3 Schreck FBA-17HMT2 amphibians, it also operated Lublin R-XIIIbis and PWS-5T2 liaison aircraft. In 1934 the unit was renamed to Riverine Air Escadrille and attempts were made to expand it. The unit was disbanded at the end of 1937 due to lack of funds.
