= Bartel BM 5 =

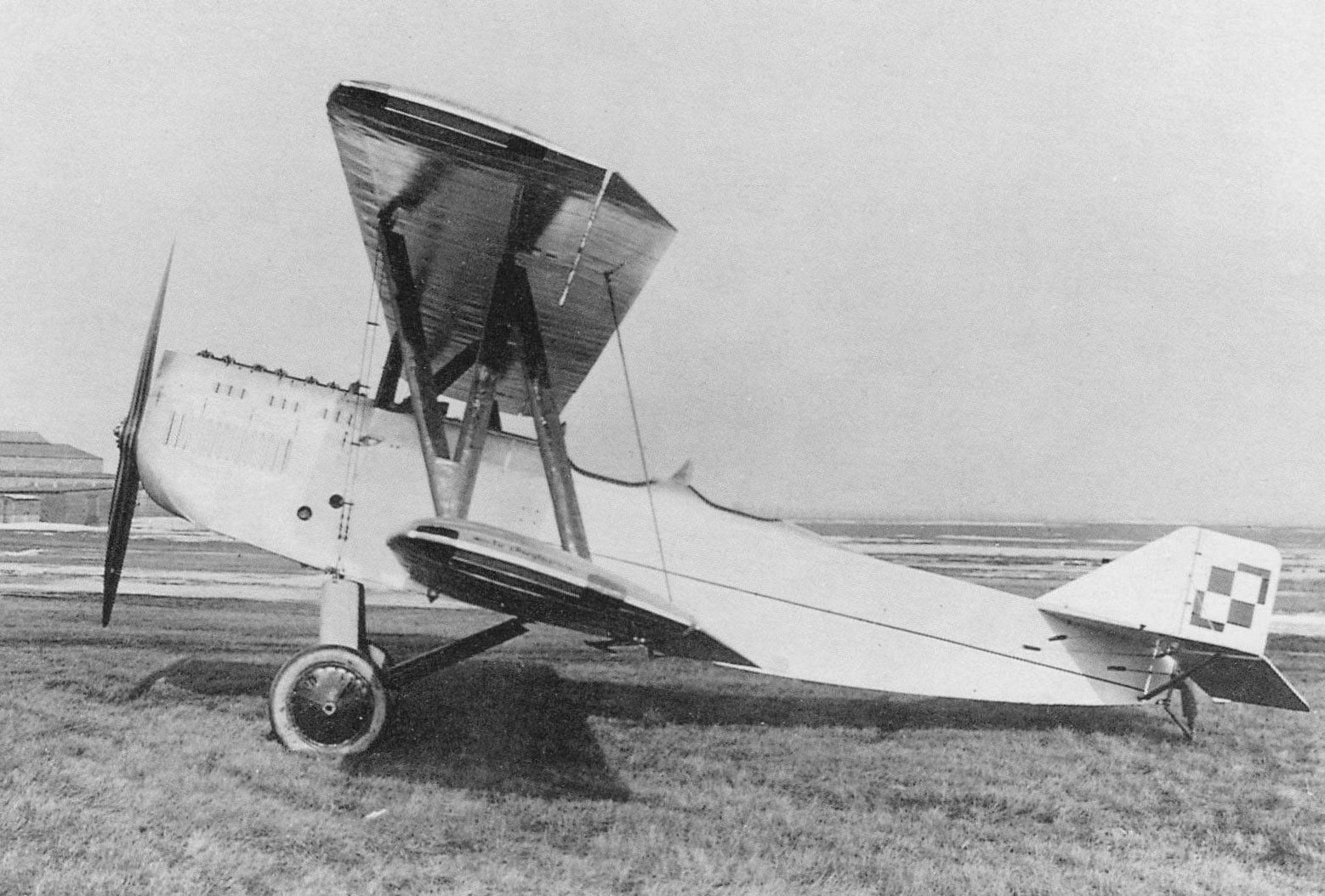

General information
- Type: Trainer aircraft
- Manufacturer: Samolot
- Primary user: Polish Air Force
- Number built: 62

History
- Manufactured: 1929-1930
- Introduction date: 1930
- First flight: 27 July 1928
- Retired: 1939

The Bartel BM 5, initially known as M.5 was a Polish biplane advanced trainer used from 1930 to 1939 by the Polish Air Force, manufactured in the Samolot factory in Poznań.

== Design and development ==
The aircraft was designed by Ryszard Bartel in Samolot factory in Poznań, as an advanced trainer, transitory between primary trainers and bomber or reconnaissance aircraft. Bartel had worked since 1926 on his BM-3 advanced trainer design, the preliminary design for which won a military contest, but in the meantime he developed a quite successful primary trainer Bartel BM-4 and then decided to model the advanced trainer upon that plane, to obtain better durability. The result was the BM 5 design. The BM 5 prototype was built in 1928 and flown on 27 July that year in Poznań. It had good handling, high stability and spin resistance, which made it a suitable trainer for larger aircraft. A distinguishing feature of all Bartels was an upper wing of a shorter span, because lower and upper wing halves were interchangeable (i.e. the lower wingspan included the width of the fuselage).

The first prototype was designated BM 5a and was fitted with a 220 hp (160 kW) Austro-Daimler inline engine. The second prototype, flown on 15 April 1929, was designated BM 5b and was fitted with a 230 hp (170 kW) SPA-6A inline engine, then was refitted in August with a 320 hp (240 kW) Hispano-Suiza 8Fb V-engine and redesignated BM 5c (it was meant to utilize engine stores from the Bristol F.2 Fighter). Next 20 aircraft of each type were built: BM 5a, BM 5b and BM 5c.

A disadvantage of most BM 5s were old and faulty engines. From all the variants the BM 5a variant was the heaviest and had the worst performance. For that reason in 1935 one BM 5 was fitted at the PZL works with a 240 hp (180 kW) Wright Whirlwind J-5 radial engine, produced in Poland (in Polish Skoda Works, then Avia). This variant was designated the BM 5d and 20 of BM 5a and BM-5b were next converted to BM 5d.

=== Description ===
Wooden construction biplane. Fuselage rectangular in cross-section, plywood covered (engine section - aluminum covered). Rectangular two-spar wings, plywood and canvas covered. Crew of two, sitting in tandem in open cockpits, with individual windshields and twin controls, instructor in rear cockpit. Fixed landing gear, with a rear skid. Engine in front, with a water radiator below fuselage nose (BM-4a, b, c). Two-blade wooden propeller. Fuel tanks in upper wings and fuselage, capacity: 235-270 L.

== Operational history ==
BM 5s were used in the Polish Air Force for training from 1930, in a central pilots' school in Dęblin. Five BM 5c's were used in Naval Air Unit (MDLot) in Puck, but most were written off in the second half of 1930s and replaced with the PWS-26. Some survived until the German invasion of Poland in September 1939, but none survived the war.

== Variants ==
BM 5a
Austro-Daimler 6-cylinder straight engine, water-cooled, 220 hp (160 kW) nominal power
BM 5b
SPA 6A 6-cylinder straight engine, water-cooled, 230 hp (170 kW) take-off power, 220 hp (160 kW) nominal power
BM 5c
Hispano-Suiza 8Fb 8-cylinder V-engine, water-cooled, 320 hp (240 kW) take-off power, 300 hp (220 kW) nominal power
BM 5d
Wright Whirlwind J-5 9-cylinder radial engine, 240 hp (180 kW) take-off power, 220 hp (160 kW) nominal power

== Operators ==
Poland

- Polish Air Force

== Specifications(BM 5b SPA engine) ==
Data from Polish Aircraft 1893–1939

General characteristics

- Crew: 2
- Length: 7.81 m (25 ft 7 in)
- Wingspan: 11.2 m (36 ft 9 in)
- Height: 3.18 m (10 ft 5 in)
- Wing area: 31 m^{2} (330 sq ft)
- Aspect ratio: 7
- Empty weight: 906 kg (1,997 lb)
- Gross weight: 1,294 kg (2,853 lb)
- Fuel capacity: 260 L (69 US gal; 57 imp gal) in two gravity tanks and a main fuselage tank
- Powerplant: 1 × SPA 6A 6-cyl. water-cooled in-line piston engine, 160 kW (220 hp)
- Propellers: 2-bladed Szomański fixed pitch wooden propeller

Performance

- Maximum speed: 164 km/h (102 mph, 89 kn) at sea level
- Cruise speed: 150 km/h (93 mph, 81 kn)
- Stall speed: 70 km/h (43 mph, 38 kn)
- Range: 450 km (280 mi, 240 nmi)
- Service ceiling: 3,250 m (10,660 ft)
- Rate of climb: 4 m/s (790 ft/min)
- Time to altitude: 8 minutes 9 seconds to 1,000 m (3,300 ft), 35minute 38 seconds to 3,000 m (9,800 ft)
- Wing loading: 41.7 kg/m^{2} (8.5 lb/sq ft)
- Power/mass: 0.116 kW/kg (0.0704 hp/lb)

== Bibliography ==
- Glass, Andrzej (1977). Polskie konstrukcje lotnicze 1893–1939 (in Polish). Warsaw: WKiŁ.
- Nelcarz, Bartolomiej & Peczkowski, Robert (2001). White Eagles: The Aircraft, Men and Operations of the Polish Air Force 1918–1939. Ottringham, UK: Hikoki Publications. ISBN 1-902109-73-2.
