= PWS-16 =

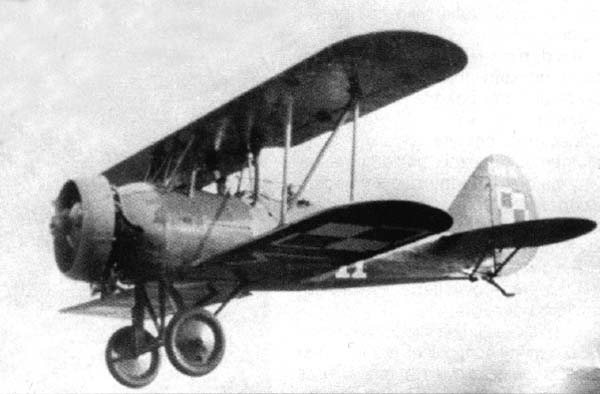

General information
- Type: Trainer biplane
- National origin: Poland
- Manufacturer: PWS
- Primary user: Polish Air Force
- Number built: 40

History
- Introduction date: 1934
- First flight: 1933
- Developed from: PWS-14
- Variant: PWS-26

The PWS-16 was a biplane trainer designed and developed by Podlaska Wytwórnia Samolotów (PWS). An armed variant also entered production as the PWS-26.

== Development ==
Developed from the PWS-12 and PWS-14 trainers, the PWS-16 two-seat biplane design introduced a number of improvements particularly improved ailerons. A variant designated PWS-16bis had a revised fuel system to allow inverted flight. It had also improved aerodynamics and its silhouette changed. The aircraft entered service with the Polish Air Force training units between 1933 and 1934. An improved armed version was developed as the PWS-26 and when the PWS-26 entered service in 1937, the PWS-16 was relegated to secondary duties.

== Variants ==
PWS-16
20 built.
PWS-16bis
20 built.
PWS-26

Armed trainer variant.

== Operators ==
Poland

- Polish Air Force

(Spain)

- Aviación Nacional (20 bought through SEPEWE in 1937)

== Specifications (PWS-16) ==
General characteristics

- Crew: 1
- Capacity: 1 (Trainee)
- Length: 7.03 m (23 ft 0.75 in)
- Wingspan: 9.0 m (29 ft 6.25 in)
- Height: 2.75 m (9 ft 0.25 in)
- Wing area: 24 m^{2} (258.34 sq ft)
- Powerplant: 1 × Wright J-5 Whirlwind radial engine , 164 kW (220 hp)

Performance

- Maximum speed: 215 km/h (134 mph, 116 kn)

== See also ==
Related development

- PWS-12
- PWS-14
- PWS-26
