= PWS-26 =

Polish advanced training aircraft

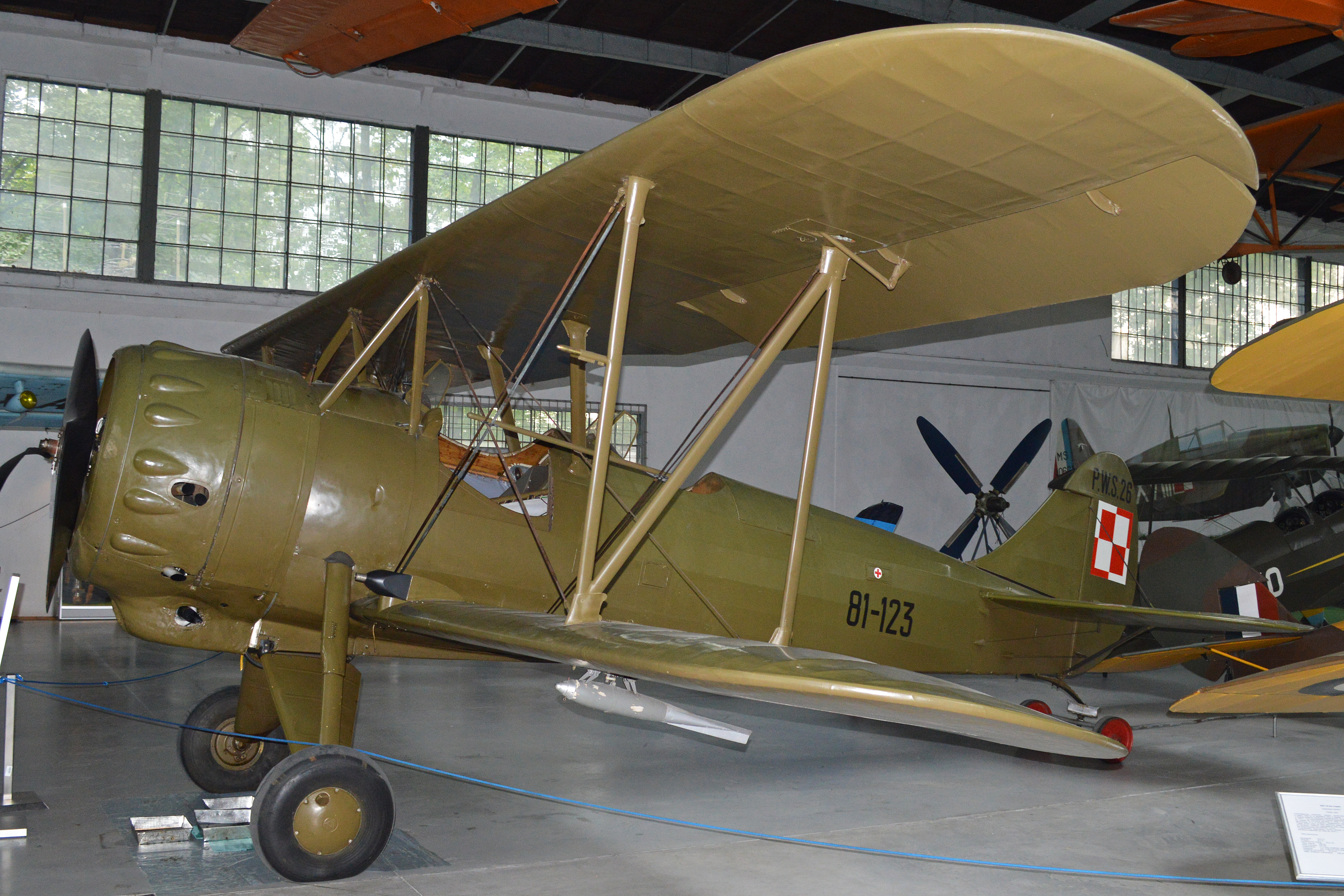
- PWS-26 in the Polish Aviation Museum

General information
- Type: Trainer aircraft
- Manufacturer: PWS
- Primary users: Polish Air Force Romanian Air Force
- Number built: 310

History
- Manufactured: 1936-1939
- Introduction date: 1937
- First flight: 1935
- Retired: 1953
- Developed from: PWS-16

The PWS-26 was a Polish advanced training aircraft, used from 1937 to 1939 by the Polish Air Force, constructed in the PWS (Podlaska Wytwórnia Samolotów - Podlasie Aircraft Factory). It was the second most numerous Polish pre-war aircraft, after the RWD-8.

== Design and development ==
The aircraft was a final development of a series: PWS-12, PWS-14 and PWS-16, designed in response to a Polish Air Force requirement for an advanced trainer. The chief designer was Augustyn Zdaniewski. The PWS-26 was a direct development of the PWS-16bis, sharing the same silhouette, being a more militarized variant - with strengthened construction, which allowed dive-bomber training. Contrary to its predecessors, the PWS-26 could be armed with a forward-shooting machine gun and practice bombs. It also had other improvements and was capable of aerobatics. A visual difference from the PWS-16bis were the canvas-covered struts of the landing gear.

The prototype was flown in 1935. After trials, its production started in 1936. By the outbreak of World War II in 1939, 310 had been built.

The PWS-26 was used in Polish military aviation from early 1937, becoming a standard type of advanced trainer for fighter pilots. It replaced most of the older PWS-14s, PWS-16s, PWS-18s (a licence-built Avro Tutor) and Bartel BM-5d's. They carried numbers starting with "81-". The PWS-26 was regarded as a successful aircraft, with good flight characteristics. During its Polish service, there were 10 fatal crashes, which was not a high number.

== Operational history ==
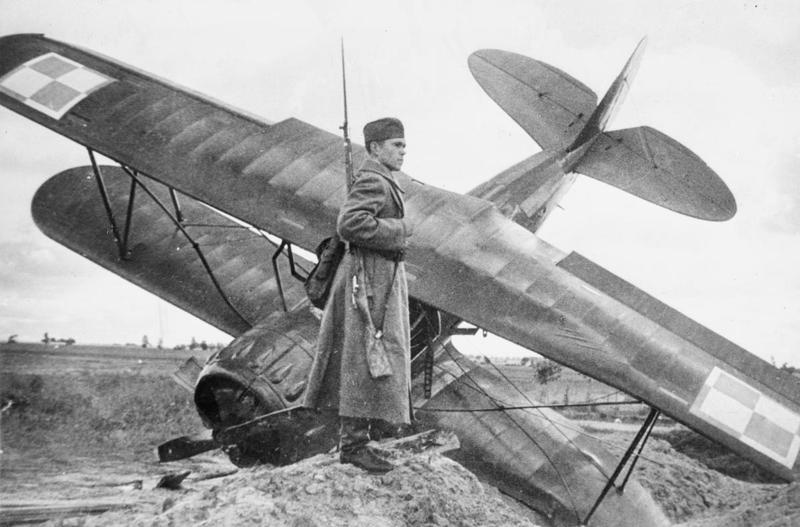
Soviet sentry guarding a crashed PWS-26 near Rivne, September 1939

After the German invasion of Poland, some PWS-26s were used in liaison flights, three aircraft in each, assigned to Armies (basic equipment of liaison flights was the RWD-8). They were also used in improvised liaison units. At least 45 were used in combat units during the campaign in total. The PWS-26 was mostly used as a replacement aircraft.

According to a report by Jan Falkowski, on September 3, 1939, while flying a PWS-26, he made a chasing Bf 109 crash near Lublin, by performing low-level manoeuvres, but there was no confirmation from the Germans. A single PWS-26 and two RWD-8s of the Independent Operational Group Polesie, were the last Polish aircraft in the sky during the campaign. They were grounded by General Franciszek Kleeberg on October 2, 1939. Some Czech pilots flew these aircraft during the campaign on the Polish side. Account of Jan Falkowski of the above kill. "I was only 200 feet from the ground when I tried a trick. I put my plane into a dive, all the time watching one of the Germans who was trying to get on my tail. I did little twists and turns, not allowing the enemy to get me squarely in his sights. All the time we were getting closer and closer to the ground. I brought him to about 50 feet off the ground and in the last second, dived again, then immediately pulled into a left turn. I missed the ground by a scat 10 feet, I figured. The German wasn't so lucky." (account of Jan Falkowski causing the Bf 109 to crash, taken from his auto biography "With The Wind In My Face"). According however to Marius Emmerling, this victory can not be attributed to particular German losses.

Some PWS-26s were shot down by the Germans, at least one was shot down by the Soviets on September 19. A large number of PWS-26s were destroyed on the ground by the Germans or burned by the withdrawing Poles. At least two were evacuated to Romania and 20 or so Latvia. This latter group were captured by the Germans - in 1941. After repairing, 50 or so were sold to Romania, and in 1943 Romanian Air Force had 56 of them. In 1944 some of them, fitted with bomblets, were used for night attacks. Some were used in civilian aviation, and were used in Romania until the 1950s. Two were tested in Germany. A dozen or so were captured by the Soviets in Poland and also used by them for testing.

== Operators ==
Bulgaria

- Bulgarian Air Force

Germany

- Luftwaffe operated unknown number of captured aircraft

Poland

- Polish Air Force

Romania

- Royal Romanian Air Force

Soviet Union

- Soviet Air Force captured and used unknown number of aircraft in September 1939 and seized more in 1940 after invasion on Baltic States.

== Surviving aircraft ==
Only one PWS-26 (Nr. 81-123) has survived. Captured by the Germans in September 1939, it was part of the German aviation museum, displayed with the Luftwaffe markings VG+AS. The aircraft was found in Poland after the war and used until 1953 by civilian operators with the markings SP-AJB. It is currently preserved in the Polish Aviation Museum in Kraków.

== Specifications (PWS-26) ==
Data from

General characteristics

- Crew: 2
- Length: 7.03 m (23 ft 1 in)
- Wingspan: 9.00 m (29 ft 6 in)
- Height: 2.74 m (9 ft 0 in)
- Wing area: 24 m^{2} (260 sq ft)
- Airfoil: IAW-109 (PWS-B6, Goettingen 655) (14.2%)
- Empty weight: 850 kg (1,874 lb)
- Gross weight: 1,162 kg (2,562 lb)
- Fuel capacity: 148 L (33 imp gal; 39 US gal)
- Powerplant: 1 × Avia-Wright J-5B Whirlwind 9-cylinder air-cooled radial piston engine, 160 kW (220 hp)
- Propellers: 2-bladed fixed-pitch propeller

Performance

- Maximum speed: 217 km/h (135 mph, 117 kn) at sea level
- Cruise speed: 180 km/h (110 mph, 97 kn)
- Range: 460 km (290 mi, 250 nmi)
- Service ceiling: 4,620 m (15,160 ft)
- Time to altitude: 3 min 45 s to 1,000 m (3,300 ft)

Armament
1 x 7.7 mm machinegun, 2 x 12 kg bombs (optional)

== See also ==
Related development

- PWS-12
- PWS-14
- PWS-16
