= PWS-11 =

Polish aerobatic and trainer aircraft

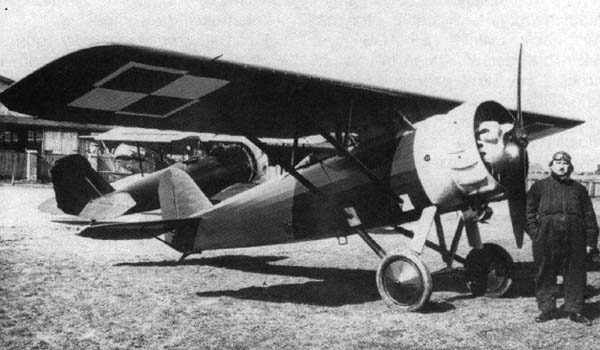
- PWS-11SM

General information
- Type: Trainer aircraft
- Manufacturer: PWS
- Status: prototype
- Number built: 2

History
- First flight: 1929

The PWS-11 was a Polish aerobatic and trainer aircraft, developed in 1928-1929 by PWS (Podlaska Wytwórnia Samolotów - Podlasie Aircraft Factory), which remained a prototype.

== Design and development ==
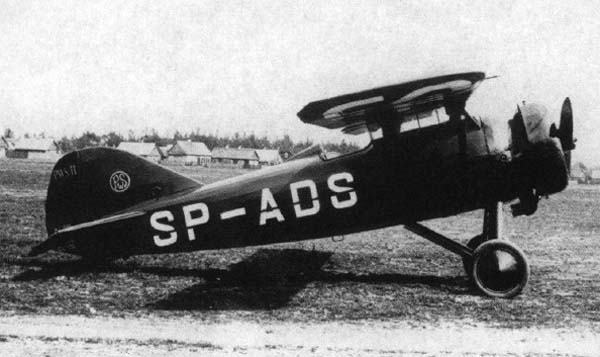
PWS-11bis

In parallel with development of a fighter aircraft, the PWS-10, the design team of Aleksander Grzędzielewski and Augustyn Bobek-Zdaniewski from the PWS factory, started work on an intermediate aircraft for training fighter pilots. Like the PWS-10, the new plane was of a parasol wing configuration, but the shape of the fuselage, wings and empennage were similar to a liaison aircraft, the PWS-5 of the same designers and powered by the same engine. In 1929, the Aviation Department of the Polish War Ministry ordered the prototypes and an airframe for static tests. The plane was initially known as PWS-11SM, for szkolno-myśliwski (fighter/trainer).

The first prototype of the PWS-11 was flown in November 1929 at Biała Podlaska by Franciszek Rutkowski. Its handling characteristics were lacking and as a result, its empennage underwent several modifications. The second prototype of 1930, designated the PWS-11bis was much improved. The rectangular section fuselage was replaced by an oval one and an engine was fitted with a Townend ring. After further changes to the empennage and Townend ring, the aircraft was then highly maneuverable and was found satisfactory. The Air Force however was not interested and the plane was not built in series.

== Operational history ==
The second prototype PWS-11bis received a registration number SP-ADS and was used for aerobatics, flown by Col. J. Kossowski, among others.

== Construction ==
The PWS-11 was a single-seater parasol wing monoplane of wooden construction. The framed fuselage had a skin made of plywood (PWS-11) or aircraft fabric on wood strips (PWS-11bis), except for the engine compartment which was covered with duralumin sheeting. The rectangular wooden wings had two spars, which were covered with fabric and plywood and were supported by twin struts. The empennage was wooden, with the fixed surfaces plywood covered and fabric on the control surfaces. The pilot sat in an open cockpit, protected by a windshield. The undercarriage consisted of a fixed common axle conventional landing gear, with a rear skid. Fuel was carried in a 170 L tank mounted in the fuselage, forward of the pilot's cockpit.

The 9-cylinder Skoda-Wright Whirlwind J-5B air-cooled radial engine was built under licence in the Polish Skoda Works, giving a nominal power of 220 hp (164 kW) and take-off power of 240 hp (179 kW), driving a two-blade fixed pitch wooden propeller. A cruise fuel consumption was 48 L/h.

== Specification (PWS-11bis) ==
Data from Polskie konstrukcje lotnicze 1893–1939, Polish aircraft 1893-1939

General characteristics

- Crew: 2
- Length: 6.7 m (22 ft 0 in)
- Wingspan: 9 m (29 ft 6 in)
- Height: 2.44 m (8 ft 0 in)
- Wing area: 15 m^{2} (160 sq ft)
- Airfoil: Bobek-Zdaniewski No.3 (Göttingen 647)
- Empty weight: 666 kg (1,468 lb)
- Gross weight: 934 kg (2,059 lb)
- Powerplant: 1 × Skoda-Wright J-5B Whirlwind 9-cylinder air-cooled radial piston engine, 160 kW (220 hp)
- Propellers: 2-bladed Szomański fixed pitch propeller

Performance

- Maximum speed: 210 km/h (130 mph, 110 kn) at sea level

197 km/h (122 mph; 106 kn) at 2,000 m (6,600 ft)

- Cruise speed: 180 km/h (110 mph, 97 kn)
- Stall speed: 91 km/h (57 mph, 49 kn)
- Range: 630 km (390 mi, 340 nmi)
- Service ceiling: 4,950 m (16,240 ft)
- Time to altitude:

- 1,000 m (3,300 ft) in 2 minutes 44 seconds
- 3,000 m (9,800 ft) in 10 minutes 13 seconds

- Wing loading: 62.2 kg/m^{2} (12.7 lb/sq ft)
- Power/mass: 0.1294 kW/kg (0.0787 hp/lb)

== See also ==
Related development

- PWS-12

Aircraft of comparable role, configuration, and era

- RWD-10
