= Hanriot HD.19 =

1920s biplane

HD.19
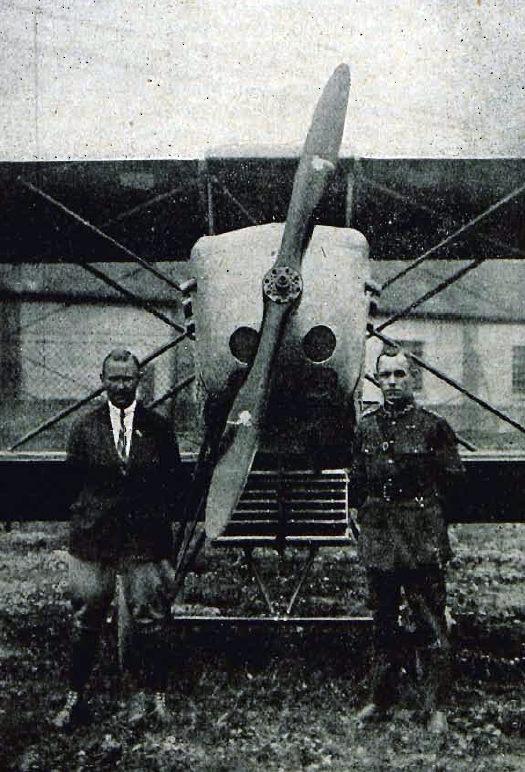
- Hanriot HD.19 of the Polish Air Force

General information
- Type: Military trainer
- National origin: France
- Manufacturer: Hanriot, Samolot
- Primary users: Aéronautique Militaire Polish Air Force
- Number built: ca. 140

History
- First flight: 1922; 103 years ago

The Hanriot HD.19 was a military trainer aircraft produced in France in the 1920s.

== Design and development ==
Part of the family of designs that began with the HD.14, the HD.19 was a two-bay biplane with unstaggered wings of equal span. The pilot and instructor sat in tandem, open cockpits. While the HD.14 and most of its derivatives were powered by rotary or radial engines, the HD.19 had a Hispano-Suiza Vee-8.

The aircraft was Hanriot's submission in a 1923 competition by the Aéronautique Militaire to select a new intermediate training aircraft, was found suitable by the military authorities, and was ordered into production. Some 50 examples saw service as the HD.19 ET.2 (École de Transition).

Poland bought six aircraft HD.19bis in 1925 and a licence to produce the type for the Polish Air Force. Production was located in the WWS Samolot factory in Poznań, which built 80 examples between 1925 and 1928, designated Hanriot H-19. The final 30 were an improved variant H-19a, with the water radiator placed underneath the engine, as opposed of the original position above the engine. A total of 86 aircraft were used by the Polish Air Force until their withdrawal in 1935. Single examples were also built by Hanriot for export to Japan and Czechoslovakia.

The aircraft was disliked by Polish pilots, as too difficult to fly for a trainer, among other difficulties demanding a precision landing. In addition, the water radiator was originally placed above the engine, which obstructed the view from the cockpit.

== Operators ==
Czechoslovakia

- One aircraft only.

France

- French Navy

Japan

- One aircraft only.

Latvia

- Latvian Navy

Poland

- Polish Air Force

== Specifications (HD.19) ==
General characteristics

- Crew: Two, instructor and student
- Length: 7.21 m (23 ft 8 in)
- Wingspan: 9.19 m (30 ft 2 in)
- Height: 2.23 m (7 ft 4 in)
- Wing area: 26.7 m^{2} (287 sq ft)
- Empty weight: 660 kg (1,460 lb)
- Gross weight: 950 kg (2,090 lb)
- Powerplant: 1 × Hispano-Suiza 8Ac , 134 kW (180 hp)

Performance

- Maximum speed: 165 km/h (103 mph, 90 kn)
- Range: 320 km (200 mi, 170 nmi)
- Service ceiling: 5,500 m (18,050 ft)

== See also ==
Related lists

- List of Interwar military aircraft

== Bibliography ==
- Taylor, Michael J. H. (1989). Jane's Encyclopedia of Aviation. London: Studio Editions. p. 470.
- World Aircraft Information Files. London: Bright Star Publishing. pp. File 896 Sheet 11.
- Morgała, Andrzej (2003). Samoloty wojskowe w Polsce 1924-1939 (in Polish). Warsaw: Bellona. ISBN 83-11-09319-9.
- Nelcarz, Bartolomiej & Peczkowski, Robert (2001). White Eagles: The Aircraft, Men and Operations of the Polish Air Force 1918–1939. Ottringham, UK: Hikoki Publications. ISBN 1-902109-73-2.
