= PWS-5 =

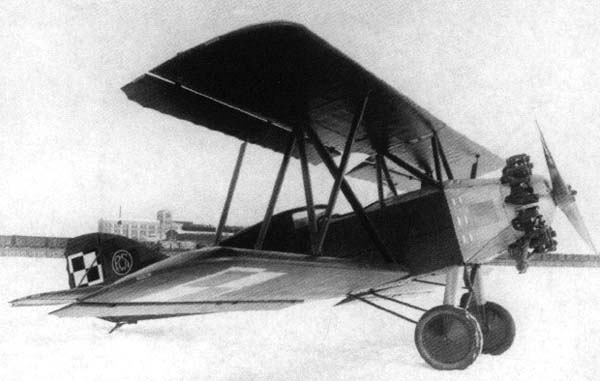
- PWS-5

General information
- Type: Liaison aircraft
- Manufacturer: PWS
- Primary user: Polish Air Force
- Number built: 2+5

History
- Manufactured: 1928-1929
- First flight: 20 December 1928

The PWS-5 or PWS-5t2, was a multi-seated Polish liaison aircraft, developed in 1928 by PWS (Podlaska Wytwórnia Samolotów - "Podlasie Aircraft Factory").

== Design and development ==
In 1927, the Aviation Department of the Polish War Ministry opened a contest for a liaison and observation plane capable of operating from unprepared airfields, in cooperation with land Army units. In the PWS factory, Aleksander Grzędzielewski and Augustyn Bobek-Zdaniewski proposed a plane, designated initially PWS-7, the first prototype of which was flown on 28 December 1928 at Biała Podlaska by Franciszek Rutkowski, with the designation changing to PWS-5 in 1929.

An interesting feature was the interchangeable upper and mainplanes which resulted in the upper wings being shorter than the lower, due to the lack of a centre-section between the upper planes. In February 1929 a second improved prototype, with a shorter forward fuselage and larger tail surfaces, designated PWS-5a was flown, which, in spite of being heavier than planned, empty weight 735 kg (1,620 lb) versus 600 kg (1,300 lb), that affected performance, the War Ministry considered the design satisfactory, with good handling and stability, ordering a short series of 5 aircraft which were designated PWS.5t2 by the factory in a similar fashion to the French Air Ministry ("t" standing for towarzyszący - army co-operation and 2 being the crew size).

However, a detailed evaluation in the Aviation Technical Research Institute (ITBL) showed, that the 'PWS.5t2' had a long take-off run, poor handling in the glide at slow speed and low ceiling due to the use of an inadequate Wright propeller. Other competitors: the PZL Ł.2 and Lublin R-X were evaluated, with better results, so no more PWS-5s were ordered.

== Construction ==
The PWS-5 was a two-seater biplane of wooden construction with a rectangular section fuselage, rectangular in cross-section 0.76 m (2 ft 6 in) wide, with plywood skin, except the engine compartment which was covered with aluminium sheeting. The rectangular wooden wings had two-spars, covered with canvas and plywood, with the Upper and lower wings connected by N-shaped inter-plane struts and staggered forward. The crew of two, sat in tandem open cockpits, the pilot having a windshield, and the observer sat in a higher cockpit with glazed upper sides, and a 7.7 mm (0.303 in) Lewis machine gun on a ring mounting. The undercarriage consisted of a fixed split axle conventional landing gear, with a rear skid. All fuel was carried in a 190 L (50 US gal; 42 imp gal) fuel tank mounted in the fuselage, forward of the pilot's cockpit.

The 9-cylinder Skoda-Wright Whirlwind J-5 air-cooled radial engine was built under licence in the Polish Škoda Works, giving a nominal power of 160 kW (220 hp) and take-off power of 180 kW (240 hp) when driving a two-blade fixed pitch wooden propeller.

== Operational history ==
Single PWS-5s were evaluated in different Lotnictwo Wojskowe (Military Aviation) units: Air Regiments nos. 2, 4 and 6 and in the Aviation Training Center at Dęblin and the Air Escadre of the River Flotilla at Pińsk, after which they were used for secondary tasks, such as target-towing.

== Variants ==
PWS-7
The original designation of the first prototype, changed early in 1929, with the revision of the PWS designation system, to PWS-5.

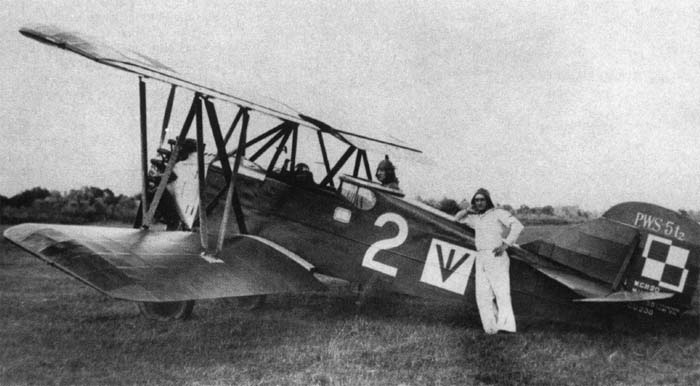
PWS-5t2

PWS-5
The designation of the two prototypes after the PWS designation revision. Two built.
PWS-5t_{2}
Production aircraft delivered to the Lotnictwo Wojskowe (Military Aviation), for trials and operational evaluation. Five built.
PWS-6

A progressive development of the PWS-5 fitted with Handley Page automatic leading-edge slats, higher aspect ratio wings, full-span flaperons on the lower wing (upper wing ailerons removed). The fuselage was faired to a circular section and the engine enclosed in a Townend ring. One built.

== Specification (PWS-5t_{2}) ==
Data from Polish Aircraft 1893–1939

General characteristics

- Crew: 2
- Length: 6.78 m (22 ft 3 in)
- Wingspan: 9 m (29 ft 6 in)
- Height: 2.9 m (9 ft 6 in)
- Wing area: 25.00 m^{2} (269.1 sq ft)
- Empty weight: 787 kg (1,735 lb)
- Gross weight: 1,180 kg (2,601 lb)
- Powerplant: 1 × Skoda-Wright J-5 Whirlwind 9-cylinder air-cooled radial piston engine, 160 kW (220 hp)
- Propellers: 2-bladed wooden fixed-pitch propeller

Performance

- Maximum speed: 155 km/h (96 mph, 84 kn) at sea level
- Cruise speed: 135 km/h (84 mph, 73 kn)
- Stall speed: 60 km/h (37 mph, 32 kn)
- Range: 550 km (340 mi, 300 nmi)
- Service ceiling: 2,500 m (8,200 ft)
- Rate of climb: 2.7 m/s (530 ft/min)
- Wing loading: 47.2 kg/m^{2} (9.7 lb/sq ft)
- Power/mass: 0.3045 kW/kg (0.1852 hp/lb)

Armament

- Guns: 1 x 7.7 mm (0.303 in) machinegun

== See also ==
Aircraft of comparable role, configuration, and era

- Lublin R-X
- PZL Ł.2
