= Bartel BM 1 =

BM 1 Maryla

General information
- Type: Fighter
- Designer: Ryszard Bartel in 1925
- Status: Design only - never built

The Bartel BM 1 Maryla, originally Bartel M.1 was a fighter aircraft design for the Polish military that did not advance beyond the design stage. It was designed in response to a Polish War Ministry competition in 1925 and was placed third, netting Bartel a zł 1,000 prize. Maryla was the name of Bartel's wife. The design was a single-seat parasol-wing monoplane similar in configuration to the Nieuport-Delage sesquiplanes of the era. A distinctive feature were Y-shaped struts joining wing with an undercarriage. It was not built.

== Specifications (as designed) ==
Data from Polish Aircraft 1893–1939 Bartel BM-1 "Maryla", 1925

General characteristics

- Crew: 1
- Length: 7 m (23 ft 0 in)
- Wingspan: 11 m (36 ft 1 in)
- Height: 3 m (9 ft 10 in)
- Wing area: 22 m^{2} (240 sq ft)
- Airfoil: Bartel 37/IIa
- Empty weight: 1,020 kg (2,249 lb)
- Gross weight: 1,500 kg (3,307 lb)
- Powerplant: 1 × Lorraine 12E Courlis W-12 cylinder liquid-cooled piston engine, 340 kW (450 hp)

Performance

- Maximum speed: 285 km/h (177 mph, 154 kn)

Armament

- 2 × fixed, forward-firing 7.7 mm (0.303 in) Vickers machine guns in the fuselage
- 2 × fixed, forward-firing 7.5 mm (0.295 in) Darne machine guns in wings
