= Bartel BM 4 =

BM.4
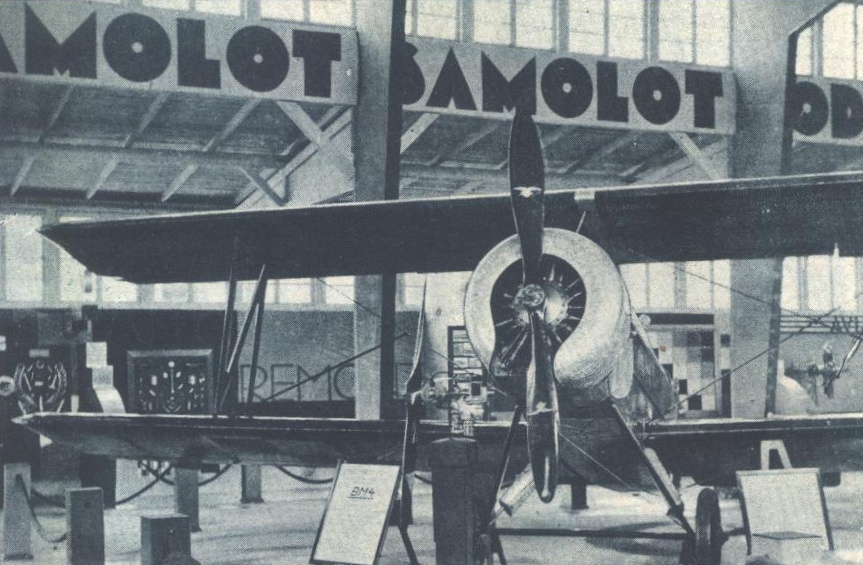
- BM.4 on exhibition at Poznan, 1929

General information
- Type: Primary trainer aircraft
- Manufacturer: Samolot, PWS
- Primary user: Polish Air Force
- Number built: ~75

History
- Manufactured: 1928–1932
- Introduction date: 1929
- First flight: 20 December 1927
- Retired: 1939

The Bartel BM.4 was a Polish biplane primary trainer aircraft used from 1929 to 1939 by the Polish Air Force and Polish civilian aviation, manufactured in the Samolot factory in Poznań. It was the first plane of Polish design put into production.

== Design and development ==
The aircraft was designed by Ryszard Bartel in the Samolot factory in Poznań. It was a development of the Bartel BM.2, which did not advance beyond the prototype stage. Thanks to a lower weight than the BM.2, it could use lower-powered engines, so its performance was actually improved. Its performance was also superior to the Hanriot H.28, used by the Poles and licence-built by Samolot. The BM.4 prototype was flown on 20 December 1927 in Poznań. It had good handling and stability and was resistant to spinning. A distinguishing feature of all Bartels was an upper wing of a shorter span, because lower and upper wing halves were interchangeable (i.e. the lower wingspan included the width of the fuselage).

The first prototype was designated BM.4b and was fitted with 67 kW (90 hp) Walter Vega radial engine. The second prototype, flown on 2 April 1928, was designated BM.4d and fitted with the Polish experimental 63 kW (85 hp) WZ-7 radial engine, then refitted with 60 kW (80 hp) Le Rhône 9C rotary engine and redesignated BM.4a. The BM.4a became a production variant, because the Polish Air Force had a store of Le Rhône 9C engines. 22 aircraft were ordered and built in 1928–1929 with cowled engines which made it different from all other BM.4s with radial engines.

Three BM.4a's were converted to BM.4e of 1930 with the Polish experimental 63 kW (85 hp) Peterlot radial engine, the BM.4f of 1931 with the Polish experimental 89 kW (120 hp) Skoda G-594 Czarny Piotruś radial engine, and the BM.4g of 1931 with a 75 kW (100 hp) de Havilland Gipsy I inline engine, which competed against the RWD-8 in a search for a standard trainer aircraft, but was not selected. After tests in 1932, all three reverted to Le Rhône 9C engines.

Due to the Samolot factory's closure in 1930, the BM.4h was developed at the PWS (Podlaska Wytwórnia Samolotów) and built there in 1932 in a series of about 50 aircraft.

=== Description ===
Wooden construction biplane, conventional in layout. Fuselage rectangular in cross-section, plywood covered (engine section - metal covered). Rectangular two-spar wings, plywood and canvas covered. Crew of two, sitting in tandem in open cockpits, with individual windshields. Cockpits with dual controls, instructor's at rear. Fixed landing gear, with a rear skid.

== Operational history ==
BM.4a's were used in the Polish Air Force from 1929 - in pilots' school in Bydgoszcz. 6 burnt in September 1929 in the Samolot factory. BM.4h's were used in the Polish Air Force from 1932, in schools in Bydgoszcz and Dęblin. They only partly replaced Hanriot H.28s and were themselves replaced with the RWD 8. They had military numbers starting with 33.

In 1936 the Polish Air Force handed over their remaining 23 BM.4h's to civilian aviation - most to regional aero clubs, some to the Ministry of Communication. They received registrations SP-BBP - BBZ and from a range SP-ARB to ARZ. Several survived until the German invasion of Poland in September 1939; several were used as liaison aircraft during the campaign, but none survived the war.

== Variants ==
BM.4a
Powered by a Le Rhône 9C 9-cylinder rotary engine, 60 kW (80 hp) nominal power.
BM.4b
Powered by a Walter Vega 5-cylinder radial engine, 67 kW (90 hp) take-off power, 63 kW (85 hp) nominal power.
BM.4c
Powered by a Lorraine-Dietrich 5Pb 5-cylinder radial engine, 93 kW (125 hp) take-off power, 110 hp nominal power. Built as a one-off in 1928, the BM-4c was supposed to be used for long-distance flights to advertise the engines, but was finally used as a factory run-about.
BM.4d
Powered by an Avia WZ-7 7-cylinder radial engine, 85 hp take-off power, 60 kW (80 hp) nominal power.
BM.4e
Powered by a Peterlot 7-cyl radial engine, 63 kW (85 hp) take-off power, 60 kW (80 hp) nominal power.
BM.4f
Powered by a Skoda G-594 Czarny Piotruś 5-cylinder radial engine, 89 kW (120 hp) take-off power, 75 kW (100 hp) nominal power.
BM.4g
Powered by a de Havilland Gipsy I 4-cylinder in-line engine, 75 kW (100 hp) take-off power, 90 hp nominal power.
BM.4h
Powered by a de Havilland Gipsy III, 4-cylinder in-line engine, 89 kW (120 hp) nominal power, with rounded tailfin and modified undercarriage introduced on late BM-4a aircraft.
or a Walter Junior 4, 4-cylinder in-linet engine, 89 kW (120 hp) take-off power, 82 kW (110 hp) nominal power.

== Operators ==
Afghanistan

- Afghan Air Force - The first prototype BM.4b was given to the king of Afghanistan Amanullah Khan during his visit to Poland in 1928.

Poland

- Polish Air Force

== Specifications (BM.4a) ==
Data from

General characteristics

- Crew: 2
- Length: 7.22 m (23 ft 8 in)
- Wingspan: 10.175 m (33 ft 5 in)
- Height: 2.93 m (9 ft 7 in)
- Wing area: 25 m^{2} (270 sq ft)
- Empty weight: 538 kg (1,186 lb)
- Gross weight: 791 kg (1,744 lb)
- Fuel capacity: 89.5 L (23.6 US gal; 19.7 imp gal)
- Powerplant: 1 × Le Rhône 9C 9-cyl. air-cooled rotary piston engine, 60 kW (80 hp)
- Propellers: 2-bladed fixed pitch wooden propeller, 2.55 m (8 ft 4 in) diameter

Performance

- Maximum speed: 125 km/h (78 mph, 67 kn) at sea level
- Cruise speed: 110 km/h (68 mph, 59 kn)
- Stall speed: 57 km/h (35 mph, 31 kn)
- Endurance: 3 hours
- Service ceiling: 2,820 m (9,250 ft)
- Rate of climb: 1.9 m/s (370 ft/min)
- Time to altitude: 1,000 m (3,281 ft) in 9 minutes 42 seconds
- Wing loading: 31.6 kg/m^{2} (6.5 lb/sq ft)
- Power/mass: 0.101 kW/kg (0.0615 hp/lb)

== Bibliography ==
Glass, Andrzej (1977). Polskie konstrukcje lotnicze 1893–1939 (in Polish). Warsaw: WKiŁ.

- Nelcarz, Bartolomiej & Peczkowski, Robert (2001). White Eagles: The Aircraft, Men and Operations of the Polish Air Force 1918–1939. Ottringham, UK: Hikoki Publications. ISBN 1-902109-73-2.
