= PWS-14 =

PWS-12 and PWS-14
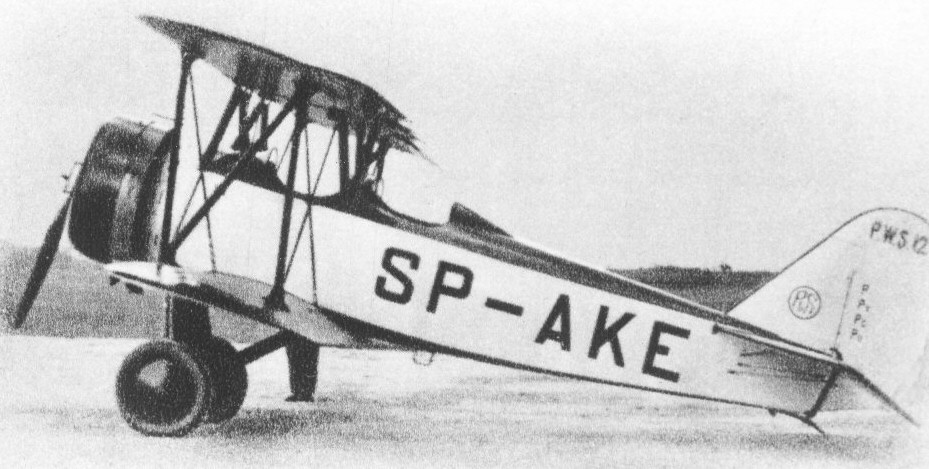
- PWS-12bis after modifications

General information
- Type: Trainer biplane
- National origin: Poland
- Manufacturer: PWS
- Primary user: Polish Air Force
- Number built: 23

History
- First flight: November 1929

The PWS-12 was a biplane trainer designed and developed by Podlaska Wytwórnia Samolotów (PWS) in Poland. It entered production as the PWS-14.

== Development ==
The PWS-12 was a single-engined two-seat training biplane, fit also for aerobatics, designed in 1928 by A. Grzędzielewski and August Bobek-Zdaniewski at the PWS factory. The design shared similar parts, including fuselage and engine, as a high-wing trainer fighter plane PWS-11, developed at the same time. The main difference was the addition of a lower wing. It was powered by a nose-mounted Skoda-built version of the Wright J-5 Whirlwind radial engine. Two prototypes and an airframe for static tests were ordered by the Aviation Department of the War Ministry in February 1928 (along with the PWS-11 prototypes). The first prototype was flown by Franciszek Rutkowski in November 1929. It was later improved - among others, a Townend ring replaced NACA cowling, and it was fitted with N-shaped struts between wings instead of perpendicular struts. The second improved prototype was flown on 18 November 1930, and designated PWS-12bis. Testing was successful and a production order for 20 aircraft was placed by the Polish Air Force.

In a meantime, the factory developed an improved model, PWS-14, featuring a change from wooden to a steel-tube fuselage, strengthened wings and other improvements, like a door in first cockpit's side. The War Ministry ordered the production of one PWS-14 and a similar modification of the series being in production. It caused some financial problems for the factory, since the production of PWS-12s had already started. As a result, the factory delivered in 1932 a series of 20 PWS-14, marked officially as PWS-12 (military numbers 57.1 - 57.20). A further development of PWS-14 was PWS-16, and then PWS-26.

== Operational service ==
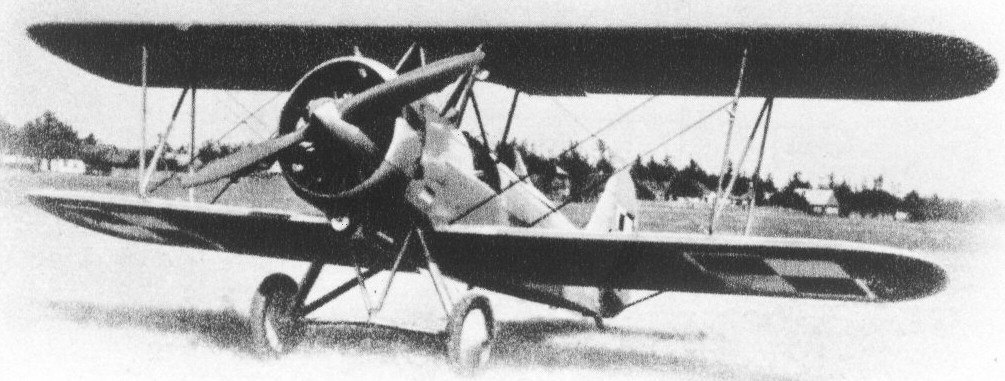
PWS-14

The PWS-14s, officially marked as PWS-12s, were used by the Polish Air Force from 1933 in the Officer Training Centre in Dęblin and a flying school in Grudziądz. Most were next replaced by the PWS-16 and PWS-26, some remained in use until World War II in 1939.

The second prototype PWS-12bis (factory no. 358) was modified in 1931 to a role of an aerobatics aircraft. Among others, fuselage sides were made flat and a rudder shape was changed. It received markings SP-AKE and was flown mainly by Lt. J. Orłowski. In March 1931 it was used in a trip to Estonia, and in April 1933 - to Romania, Bulgaria, Yugoslavia, Austria and Czechoslovakia. Then, both prototypes were used for several years as utility aircraft in Aviation Technical Research Institute (ITBL). They were later stored in Dęblin.

== Variants ==
PWS-12
Prototype of wooden construction.
PWS-12bis
Second improved prototype
PWS-14
Improved model of mixed construction (aircraft delivered to the Air Force were marked as PWS-12)

== Specifications (PWS-14) ==
Data from Glass, A. (1977)

General characteristics

- Crew: 1
- Capacity: 1 (Trainee)
- Length: 6.9 m (22 ft 8 in)
- Wingspan: 9.0 m (29 ft 6.25 in)
- Height: 2.85 m (9 ft 4 in)
- Wing area: 25 m^{2} (270 sq ft)
- Empty weight: 775 kg (1,709 lb)
- Gross weight: 1,100 kg (2,425 lb)
- Powerplant: 1 × Skoda-Wright J-5A Whirlwind radial engine , 164 kW (220 hp)

Performance

- Maximum speed: 190 km/h (118 mph, 103 kn)
- Cruise speed: 175 km/h (109 mph, 94 kn)
- Range: 640 km (400 mi, 350 nmi)
- Service ceiling: 4,500 m (14,800 ft)
- Rate of climb: 4.3 m/s (850 ft/min)

== See also ==
Related development

- PWS-11
- PWS-16
- PWS-26
