= Medwecki HL 2 =

Polish two seat lightplane

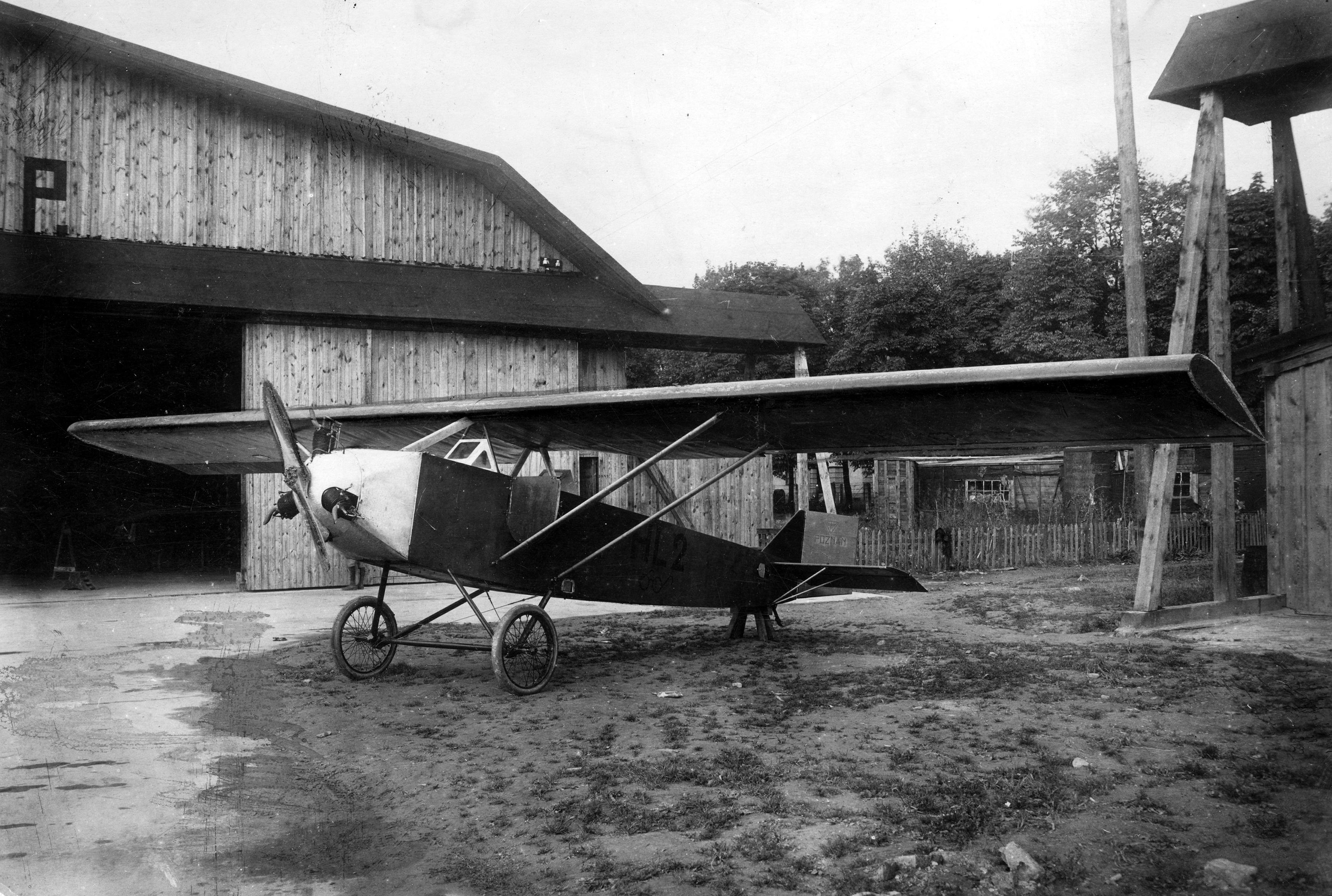

General information
- Type: Light aircraft
- National origin: Poland
- Designer: Jozef Medwecki
- Number built: 1

History
- First flight: September 1927

The Medwecki HL 2 was a Polish two seat lightplane flown in 1927. Handicapped by a low power, unreliable engine, its flying life lasted little more than a month.

== Design and development ==
Light aircraft design was slow to start in Poland but from 1924 the Airborne and Antigas Defence League, generally known by their Polish acronym L.O.P.P., began to fund amateur builders. One of the first successful bidders was Jozef Medwecki, an aircraft designer with the Samolot company. The result was the HL 2 two-seater which Medwecki built, with Samolot's approval, in their factory in his spare time. It was finished in August 1927.

The HL 2 had a parasol wing with a quite thick section and a plan that was strictly rectangular apart from a central trailing edge cut-out to improve the pilot's field of view. The wing was in two parts, built around pairs of wooden spars and ply-covered. It was supported over the fuselage on cabane struts, one leaning back from the upper central fuselage to the forward strut and the other a vertical inverted V-strut to the rear spar; the principal bracing members were parallel steel tubes from the lower fuselage longerons to the spars.

Medwecki's greatest problem was to obtain a suitable engine and in the end had to settle for an elderly, three-cylinder 26 kW (35 hp) Anzani lent to him by Samolot, which left the HL 2 seriously underpowered. It was installed in a simple, flat-sided metal cowling with its cylinder heads exposed for cooling. The cowling widened rearwards to match the dimensions of the HL 2's simple, rectangular section fuselage which was built around four wooden longerons and ply covered. Behind the fuel tanks the open cockpits were in tandem and fitted with dual control. The forward one was under the wing and was entered via a car-type door with a special lock to insure integrity of the upper longeron and the rear one, conventionally entered, was under the trailing edge cut-out.

The HL 2's strut-braced tailplane was mounted on top of the fuselage and, like the elevators, was essentially rectangular in plan. The fin was triangular and carried a rectangular rudder. Its fixed undercarriage had mainwheels on a single axle with rubber cord shock absorbers and supported at each end by a V-strut to the lower fuselage longeron. There was a short tailskid under the fin.

The HL 2 made its first flights in September 1927 from Samolot's home ground of Poznań-Lawica, flown by Wladyslaw Szulczewski. Despite the lack of power it was capable of aerobatics. It was entered as a competitor in the L.O.P.P.-organised First National Lightplane Contest held at the start of October in Warsaw but engine problems on the way there caused it to fail to meet the deadline. Nonetheless, Szulczewski took part as an unofficial contestant and at first its performance was outstanding but during a cross-country flight the engine failed again. The HL 2 was seriously damaged in the consequent emergency landing and never flew again.

== Specifications ==
Data from Cynk (1971) except where noted

General characteristics

- Crew: One
- Length: 7.1 m (23 ft 4 in)
- Wingspan: 11 m (36 ft 1 in)
- Height: 2.2 m (7 ft 3 in)
- Wing area: 16.5 m^{2} (178 sq ft)
- Airfoil: Bartel 37/IIa
- Empty weight: 291 kg (642 lb)
- Gross weight: 470 kg (1,036 lb)
- Powerplant: 1 × Anzani 3-cylinder air-cooled
- Propellers: 2-bladed

Performance

- Maximum speed: 125 km/h (78 mph, 67 kn)
- Cruise speed: 102 km/h (63 mph, 55 kn)
- Range: 320 km (200 mi, 170 nmi)
- Service ceiling: 1,300 m (4,300 ft)
- Rate of climb: 1.3 m/s (260 ft/min)
- Landing speed: 55 km/h (34 mph)
