= Gmina Wisznice =

Gmina Wisznice Wisznice Commune
- Gmina
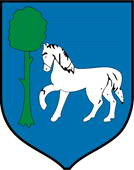
- Coat of arms
- Interactive map of Gmina Wisznice
- Coordinates (Wisznice): 51°47′24″N 23°12′32″E
- Country: Poland
- Voivodeship: Lublin
- County: Biała County
- Seat: Wisznice

Area
  - Total: 173 km^{2} (67 sq mi)

Population (2014)
  - Total: 5,060
  - Density: 29.2/km^{2} (75.8/sq mi)
- Website: http://www.wisznice.pl/

Gmina Wisznice is a rural gmina (administrative district) in Biała County, Lublin Voivodeship, in eastern Poland. Its seat is the village of Wisznice, which lies approximately 28 kilometres (17 mi) south of Biała Podlaska and 75 km (47 mi) north-east of the regional capital Lublin.

The gmina covers an area of 173 square kilometres (66.8 sq mi), and as of 2006 its total population is 5,199 (5,060 in 2014).

== Villages ==
Gmina Wisznice contains the villages and settlements of Curyn, Dołholiska, Dubica Dolna, Dubica Górna, Horodyszcze, Kolonia Wisznice, Łyniew, Marylin, Polubicze Dworskie, Polubicze Wiejskie, Ratajewicze, Rowiny, Wisznice and Wygoda.

== Neighbouring gminas ==
Gmina Wisznice is bordered by the gminas of Jabłoń, Komarówka Podlaska, Łomazy, Milanów, Podedwórze, Rossosz and Sosnówka.
