= Slieveboy =

Mountain in Ireland

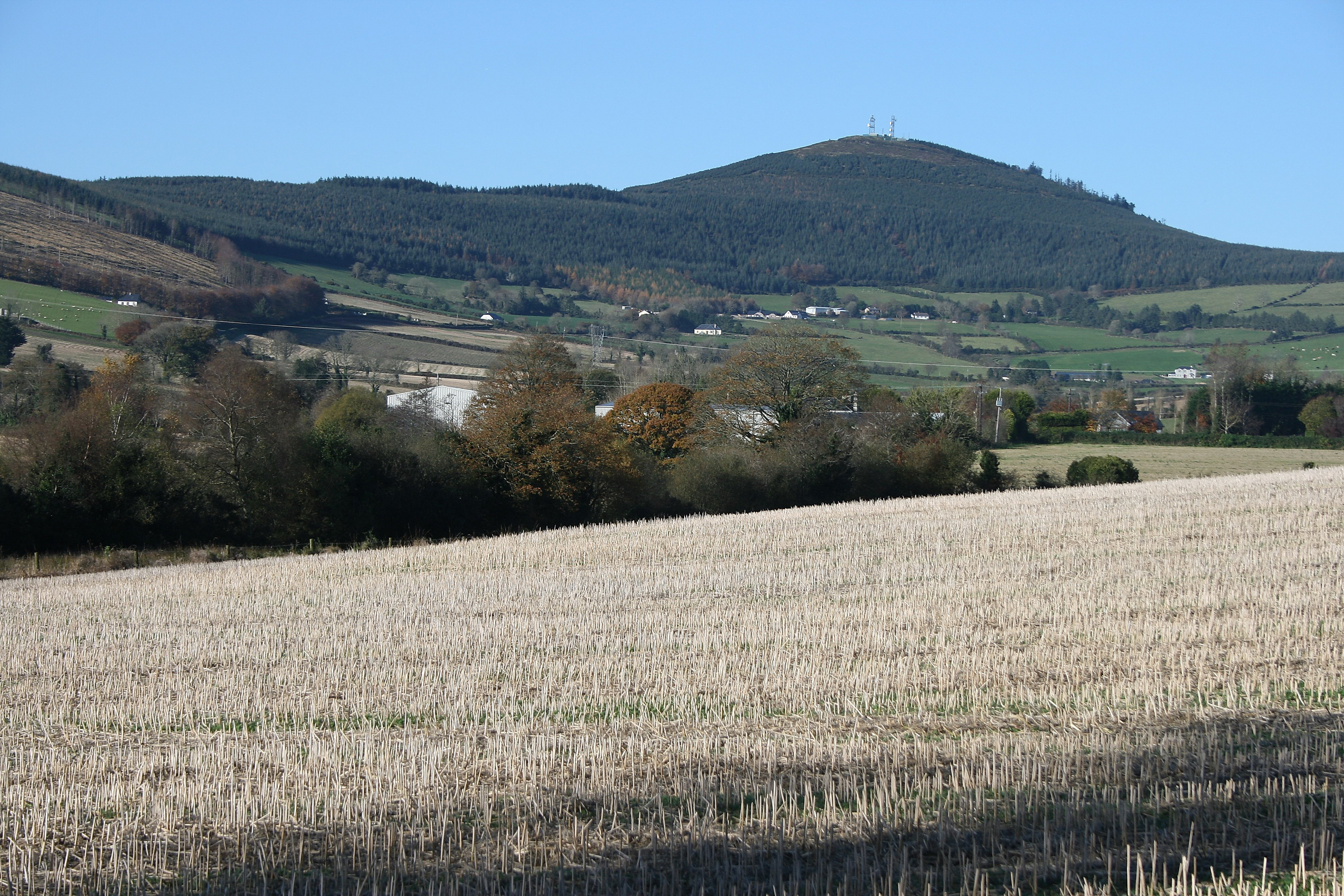
- From Camolin Park to the east

Highest point
- Elevation: 420 m (1,380 ft)
- Prominence: 304 m (997 ft)
- Listing: Marylin
- Coordinates: 52.656234°N 6.489369°W

Naming
- Native name: Sliabh Buí

Geography
- Location within island of Ireland
- Location: County Wexford, Ireland
- OSI/OSNI grid: T022571
- Topo map: OSi Discovery 69

Climbing
- Easiest route: Askamore gap from north

Slieveboy (Irish: Sliabh Buí) is a mountain located in north County Wexford, Ireland.

== Etymology ==
It is never called 'Slieveboy' by locals, but always its Irish form Sliabh Buí, which is pronounced 'Shleeav Bwee'. Sliabh Buí means Yellow Mountain.

== Geography ==
The mountain rises directly above the village of Ballyduff, midway between Carnew and Camolin. The mountain is, except for the area around the summit, completely covered in forest. There is a network of forest roads on the hill, and two communication masts on the summit.

== See also ==
- Wicklow Mountains
- List of mountains in Ireland
