= BXP =

BXP may refer to:

- Boston Properties, a large American real estate company
- Milkor BXP, a South African submachine gun
- Beximco Pharma, a pharmaceutical company in Bangladesh
- Bebil language of Cameroon
- Biała Podlaska Airport, eastern Poland
- Beijing West railway station
