= St. Anne's Church, Biała Podlaska =

Church building in Biała Podlaska, Poland

Coordinates: 52°01′59″N 23°07′03″E

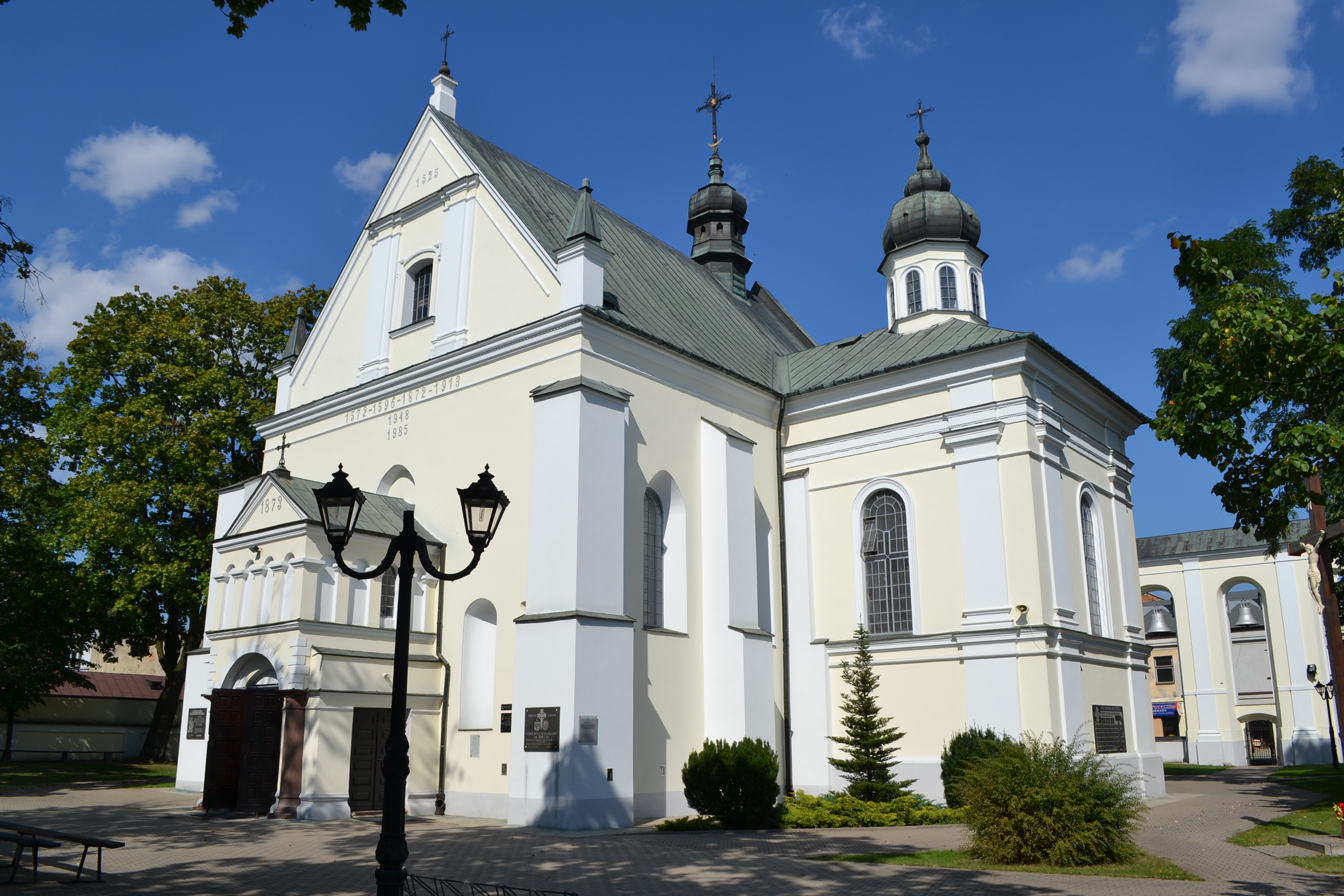
St. Anne's Church

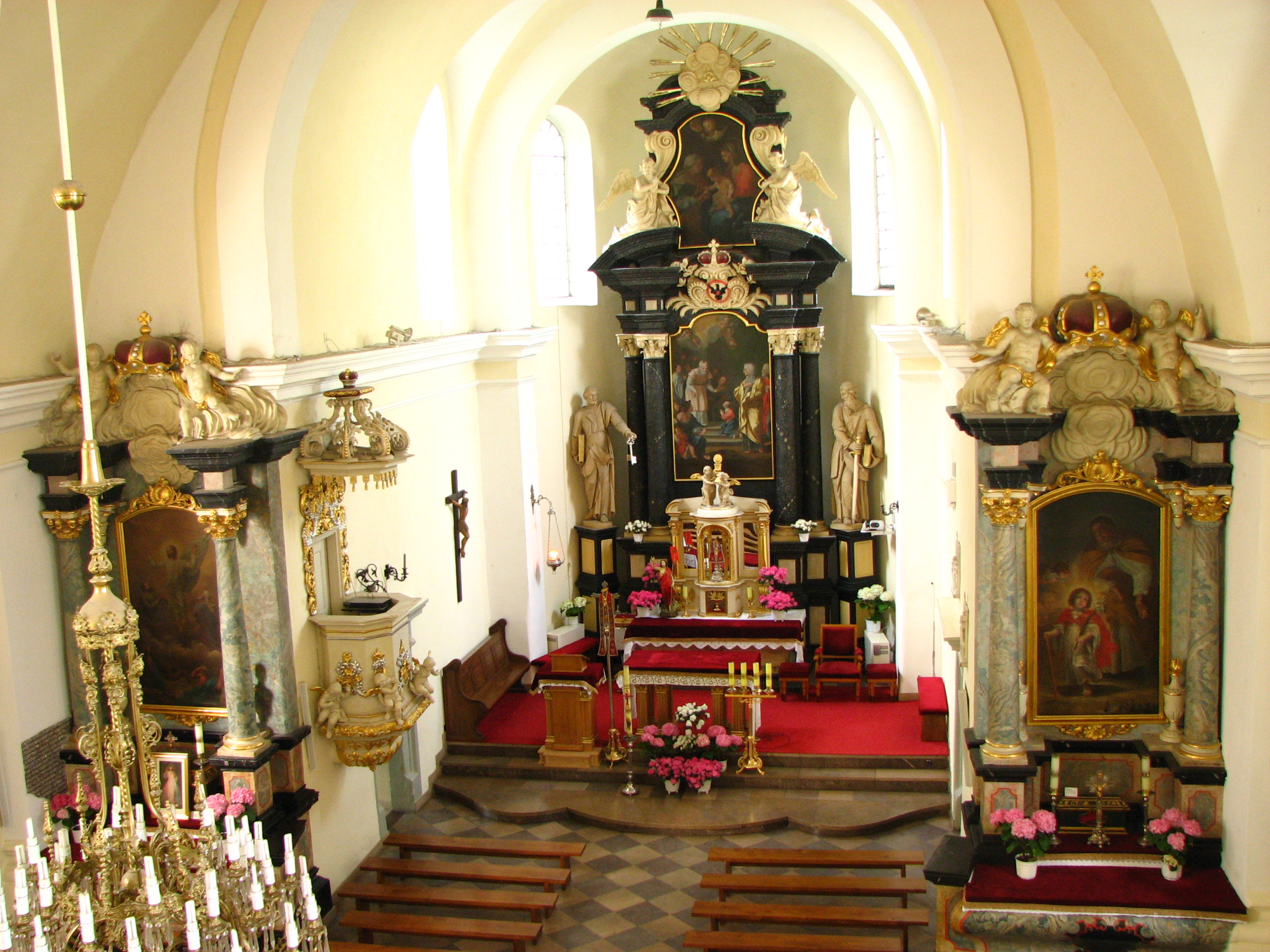
View of the interior

St. Anne's Church (Polish: Kościół Świętej Anny) is a Baroque Roman Catholic church located in the town of Biała Podlaska, in eastern Poland.

== History ==
It was originally built in 1572, on the site of an earlier shrine, as a Protestant church dedicated to the Arianism doctrine. The Protestants were expelled in 1596 by Mikołaj Krzysztof "the Orphan" Radziwiłł. Between 1597 and 1603 it was rebuilt as a Catholic church, being dedicated to Saint Anne in 1603. The church is built in the shape of a Latin cross.

Katarzyna Sobieska, who was the sister of King John III Sobieski and the wife to Michał Kazimierz Radziwiłł, installed a crescent under a Latin cross atop the spire to commemorate the victory of the Christian Coalition at the Battle of Vienna.

== Surroundings ==
Near to the church there are multiple structures, including:

- A wooden vicar's house (wikarówka) from the 18th century with traditional roof shingles;
- A bell tower from 1765;
- A presbytery from 1750.
