= Sielczyk =

Neighbourhood of the city of Biała Podlaska, Poland

- Neighbourhood of Biała Podlaska
- Location within Poland Location within Lublin Voivodeship
- Coordinates: 52°1′39″N 23°11′16″E
- Country: Poland
- Voivodeship: Lublin
- County/City: Biała Podlaska
- Within city limits: 1979
- Time zone: UTC+1 (CET)
  - Summer (DST): UTC+2 (CEST)
- Vehicle registration: LB

Sielczyk ([ˈɕɛlt͡ʂɨk]) is a neighbourhood of Biała Podlaska, Poland, located in the eastern part of the city, on the Krzna river.

== History ==
According to the 1921 Polish census, Sielczyk with the adjacent settlement of Sielce had a population of 327, 99.7% Polish.

Following the German-Soviet invasion of Poland, which started World War II in September 1939, Sielczyk was occupied by Germany until 1944. On 12 April 1944, the 14th Waffen Grenadier Division of the SS, composed of Ukrainian nationalists collaborating with Germany, pacified the settlement, burning twelve houses and murdering nine Polish men and women.

In 1979, Sielczyk was included within the city limits of Biała Podlaska as its new neighbourhood.
