= Łyniew =

- Village
- Location within Poland
- Coordinates: 51°44′N 23°15′E
- Country: Poland
- Voivodeship: Lublin
- County: Biała
- Gmina: Wisznice

Łyniew [ˈwɨɲɛf] is a village in the administrative district of Gmina Wisznice, within Biała County, Lublin Voivodeship, in eastern Poland.
