= Wygoda, Gmina Wisznice =

Wygoda
- Village
- Location within Poland
- Coordinates: 51°46′40″N 23°11′10″E
- Country: Poland
- Voivodeship: Lublin
- County: Biała
- Gmina: Wisznice

Wygoda [vɨˈɡɔda] is a village in the administrative district of Gmina Wisznice, within Biała County, Lublin Voivodeship, in eastern Poland.
