= Rowiny =

- Village
- Location within Poland
- Coordinates: 51°50′N 23°13′E
- Country: Poland
- Voivodeship: Lublin
- County: Biała
- Gmina: Wisznice

Rowiny [rɔˈvʲinɨ] is a village in the administrative district of Gmina Wisznice, within Biała County, Lublin Voivodeship, in eastern Poland.
