= Benedykt Kraskowski =

Righteous Among the Nations

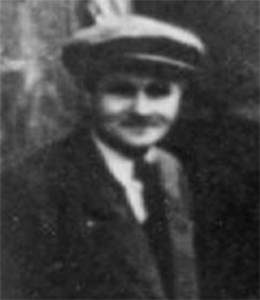
- Born: 1904; Biała Podlaska, Siedlce Governorate, Congress Poland, Russian Empire
- Died: 1944 (aged 39–40)
- Cause of death: killed by Ukrainian nationalists
- Known for: saving Jews during WWII
- Honours: Righteous Among the Nations

Benedykt Kraskowski (1904, Biała Podlaska, Congress Poland – 1944), was a Polish "Righteous Among the Nations" of German descent, with Jews he employed in his carpentry workshop.

Kraskowski, who lived in Biala Podlaska, hid Jews and procured forged identity documents for them. For those in hiding who wished to join the partisans, he provided money and food.

Kraskowski was killed by Ukrainian nationalists in 1944.

On December 16, 1986, for saving Jews, he was posthumously recognized as a Righteous among the Nations by Yad Vashem, the highest honor given to a non-Jew.

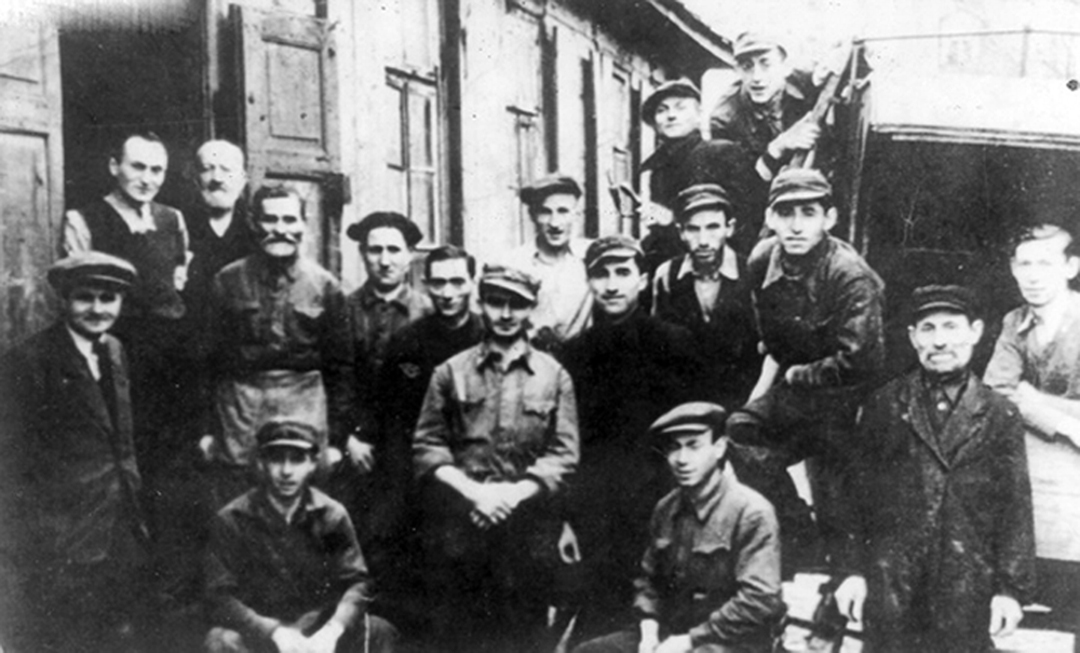
Benedykt Kraskowski (on the left) with Jews from the ghetto: Mojsze Lichtenbojm (second from the left), Dzili Kajdenbaum (standing, fourth from the left), Jankel Brodacz (standing, sixth from the left), Icchak Kaner (standing, seventh from the left), Josef Edelsztajn (standing in the long row, ninth from the left), Szimszon Esztman (standing in the long row, second from the right), Mojsze Kajdenbaum (standing in the long row, on the right), Zilia Gutenberg and Hirsz Szulman (the pair of youths at the upper right -- left and right respectively), Cuker (on the right), Aszer Kajdenbaum (second from the right), and Jehoszua Kajdenbaum (lower left).
