= Polubicze Dworskie =

- Village
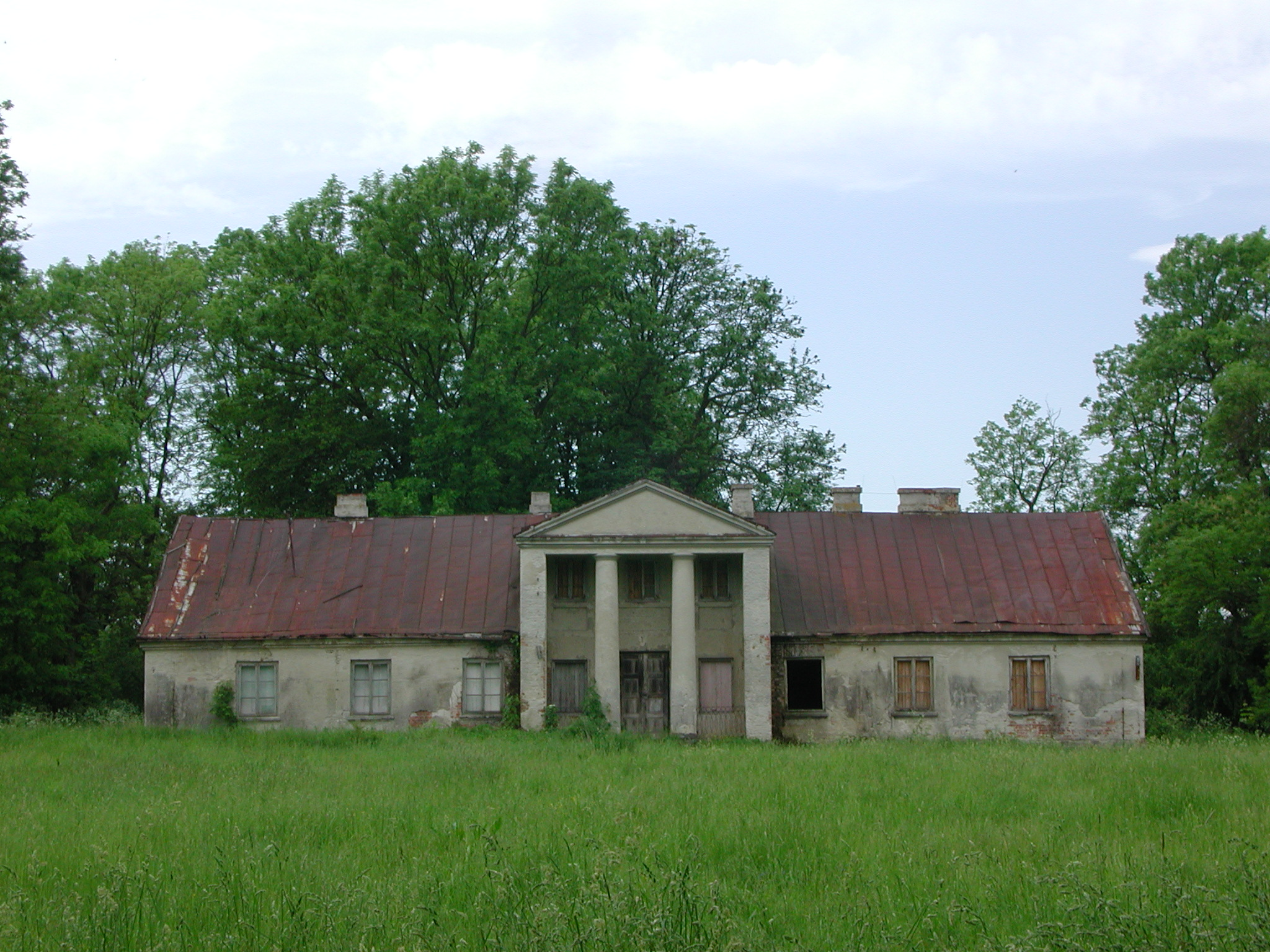

- Location within Poland
- Coordinates: 51°46′N 23°5′E
- Country: Poland
- Voivodeship: Lublin
- County: Biała
- Gmina: Wisznice

Polubicze Dworskie [pɔluˈbʲit͡ʂɛ ˈdvɔrskʲɛ] is a village in the administrative district of Gmina Wisznice, within Biała County, Lublin Voivodeship, in eastern Poland.
