= Polish Radio Lublin =

Coordinates: 51°14′41″N 22°32′45″E

Radio Lublin (Polskie Radio Lublin S.A.) - Polish public, regional broadcaster based in Lublin in east Poland. Radio Lublin is a part of a national public radio (Polish Radio). It is formatted as talk and music (contemporary hits) radio.

== History ==
Radio Lublin has started on 20 September 1952 as a cable station. Since 1 May 1957 it broadcast on the AM and since 28 December 1963 on the FM band. Today Radio Lublin broadcasts on the internet too.

== Broadcast frequencies ==
- Biała Podlaska - 93,1 FM
- Lublin - 89,9 FM
- Piaski - 102,2 FM
- Ryki - 103,1 FM
- Zamość - 103,2 FM
