= Łosice transmitter =

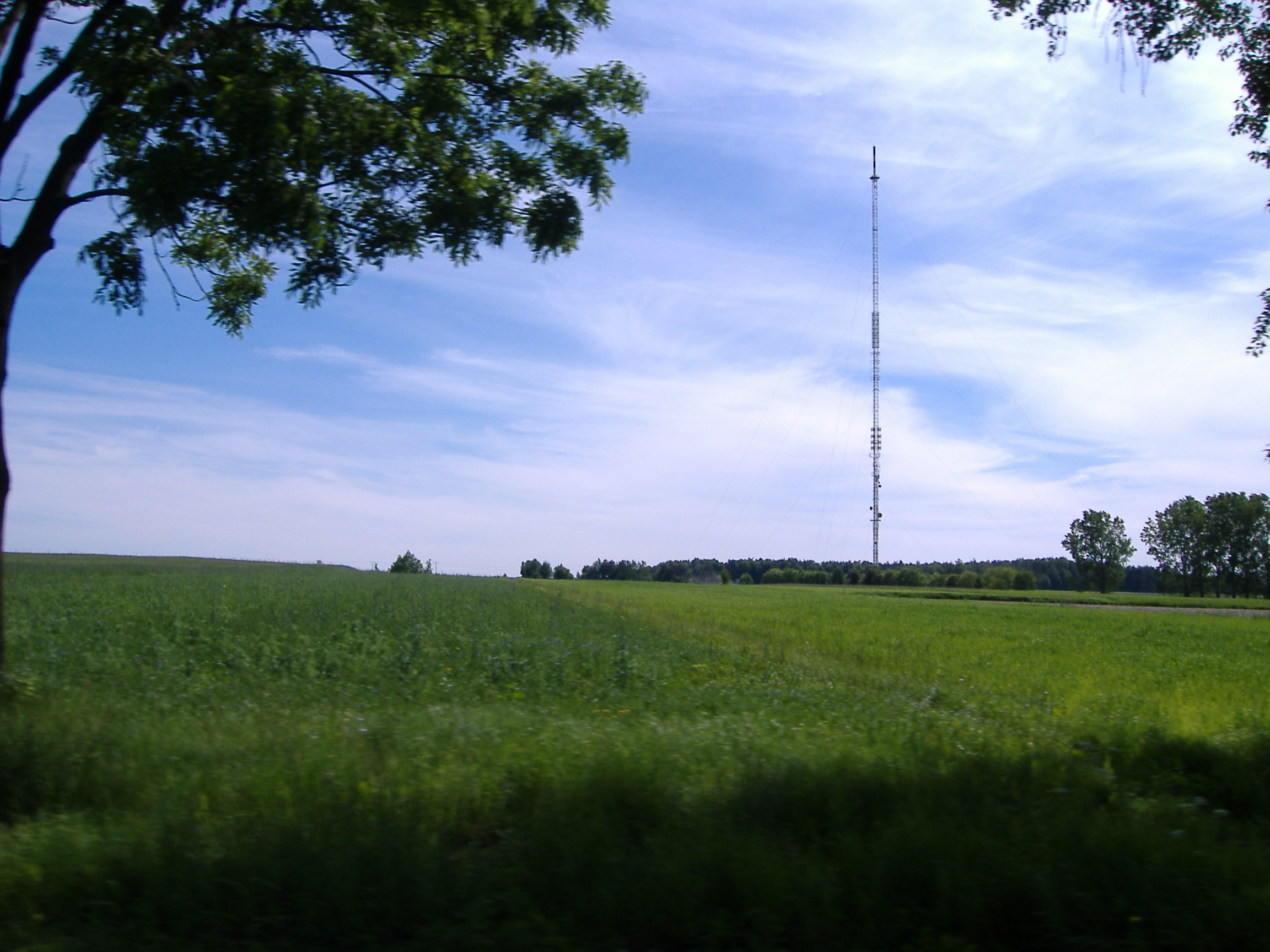

- Location within Poland
- Coordinates: 52°11′16″N 22°47′05″E

The Łosice transmitter is a facility for television and FM radio transmission sited at Chotycze in Łosice County, Poland. It uses a 313-metre-high guyed mast. The task of the transmitter is the signal coverage of the two largest cities in the region - Biala Podlaska and Siedlce. Approximate distance between both cities and the transmitter in straight line: 30 km.

== Programmes transmitted ==
=== Television (DVB-T MPEG4 and DVB-T2 HEVC) ===
Sources:DVB-T MPEG4 and DVB-T2 HEVC

Programme	Channel	Polarization	Frequency	Power
MUX 1	43	Horizontal	650 MHz	50.12 kW
MUX 2	39	Horizontal	618 MHz	50 kW
MUX 3 (Lublin)	33	Horizontal	570 MHz	50 kW
MUX 3 (Warsaw)	31	Horizontal	554 MHz	65 kW
MUX 4	32	Horizontal	562 MHz	50 kW
MUX 6	36	Horizontal	594 MHz	50.12 kW
MUX 8	9	Vertical	205.5 MHz	10 kW

=== FM radio ===
Programme	Owner	Frequency	Power
Program I	Polskie Radio	88.3 MHz	30 kW
Program III	Polskie Radio	90.5 MHz	30 kW
RMF FM	Grupa RMF	91.9 MHz	30 kW
Katolickie Radio Podlasie	Diocese of Siedlce	101.7 MHz	120 kW
Radio dla Ciebie	Polskie Radio (Warsaw Region)	103.4 MHz	120 kW
Radio Zet	Eurozet	105.4 MHz	30 kW
Radio Maryja	Redemptorist Congregation (Warsaw Province)	107.7 MHz	10 kW

== See also ==
- List of masts
