= Horodyszcze, Gmina Wisznice =

Horodyszcze
- Village
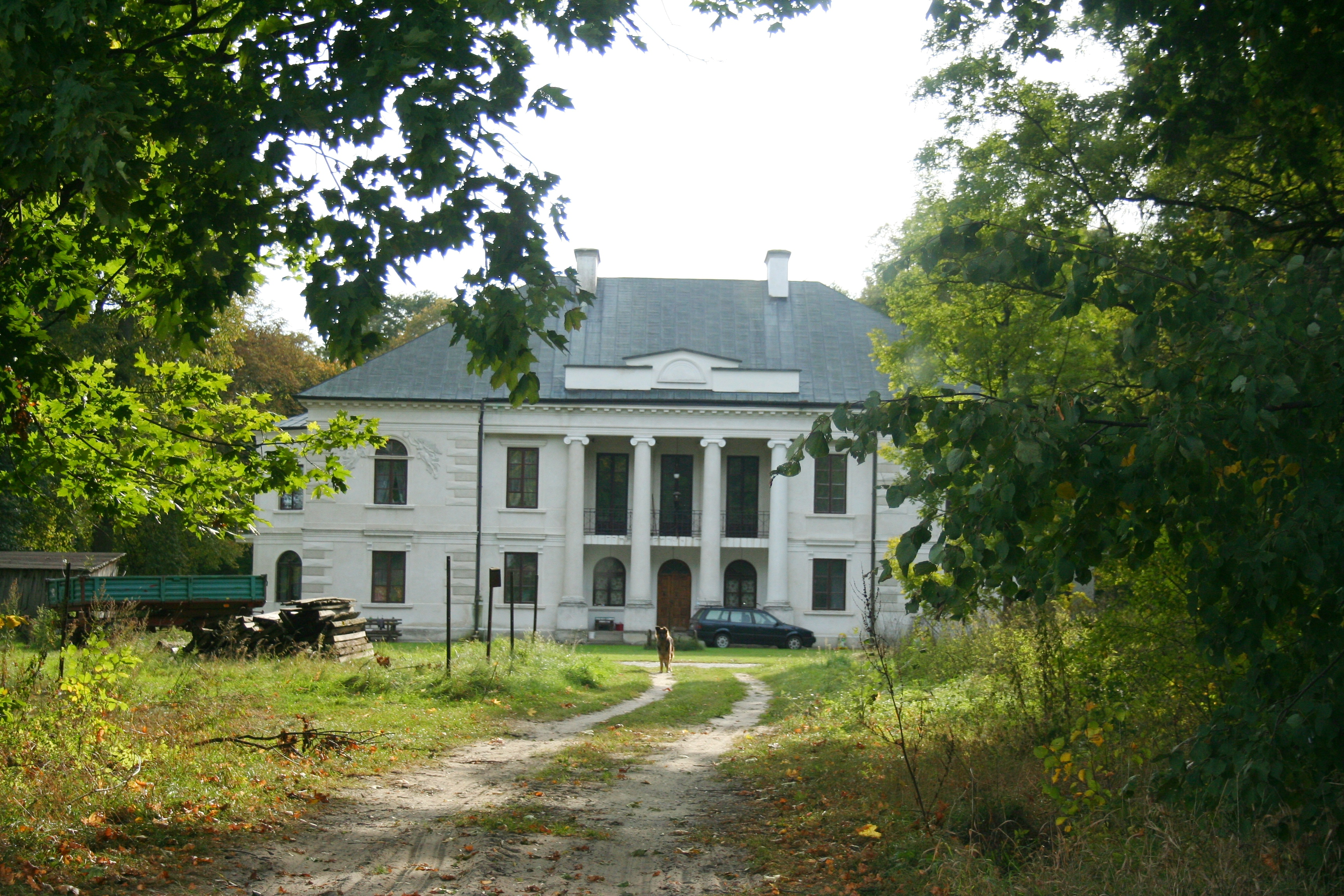
- Horodyszcze Palace

- Location within Poland
- Coordinates: 51°45′18″N 23°11′3″E
- Country: Poland
- Voivodeship: Lublin
- County: Biała
- Gmina: Wisznice

Population
  - Total: 841
- Time zone: UTC+1 (CET)
  - Summer (DST): UTC+2 (CEST)

Horodyszcze [xɔrɔˈdɨʂt͡ʂɛ] is a village in the administrative district of Gmina Wisznice, within Biała County, Lublin Voivodeship, in eastern Poland.

== History ==
Horodyszcze, which had town rights from mid-16th century until 1879, dates back to the Middle Ages. Its name comes from Eastern Slavic word horodyszcze, which means gord. The village was first mentioned in documents from 1446, and until 1944, was a private property of several noble families, including the Polubinski.

The village has remains of an early medieval settlement with a cemetery. Both are now archaeological sites, and are located south of Horodyszcze. Furthermore, the village has a Classicistic palace and park (1818–1824), designed by Antonio Corazzi for Julian Frankowski.

11 Polish citizens were murdered by Nazi Germany in the village during World War II.
