= Biała Podlaska =

- City county
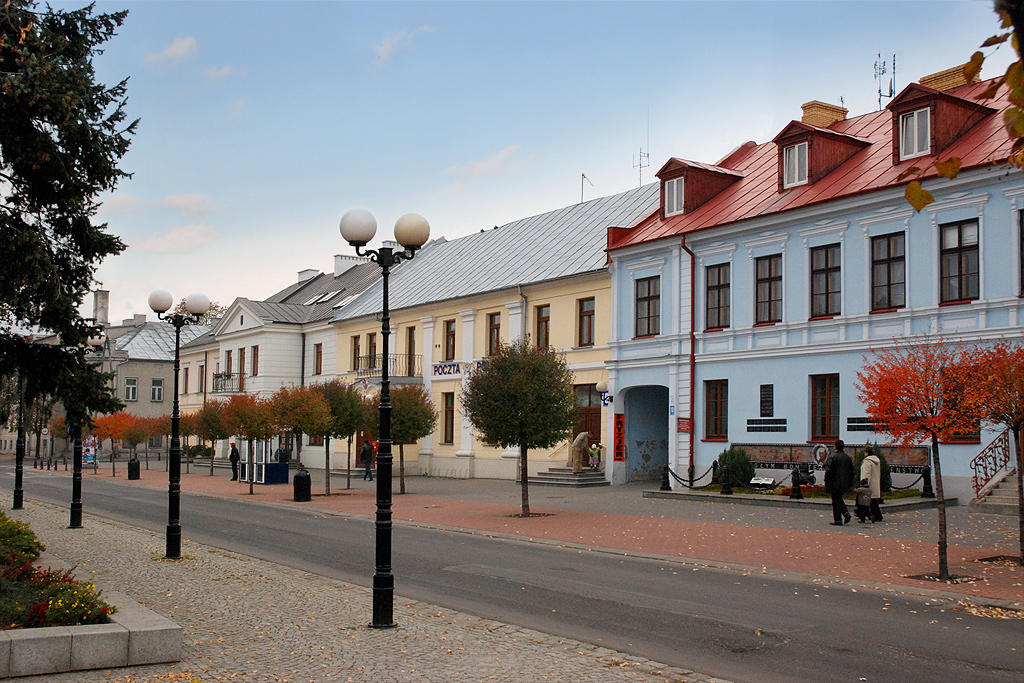
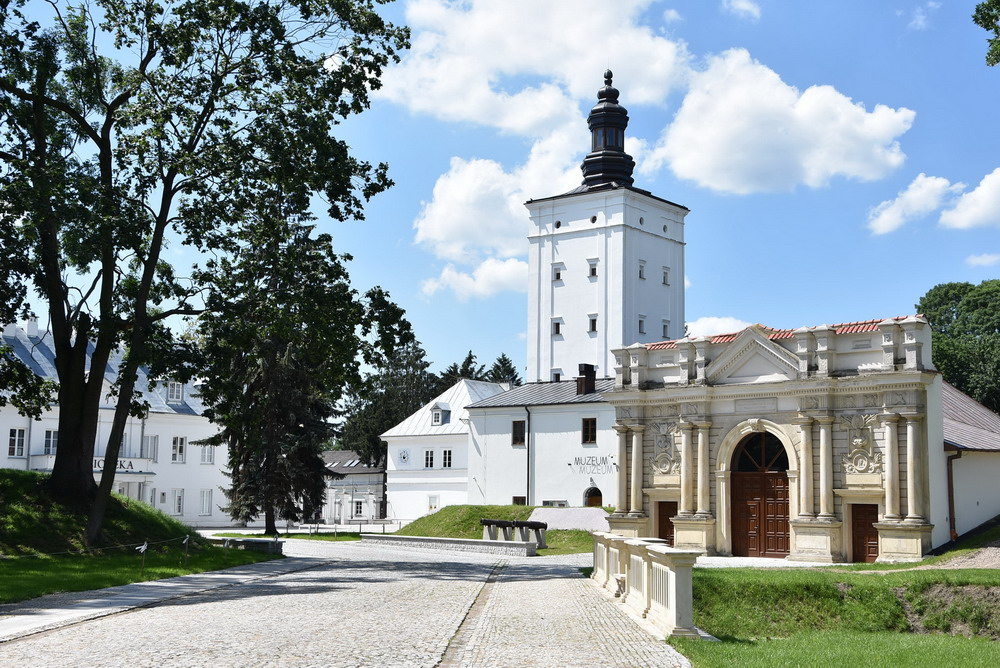
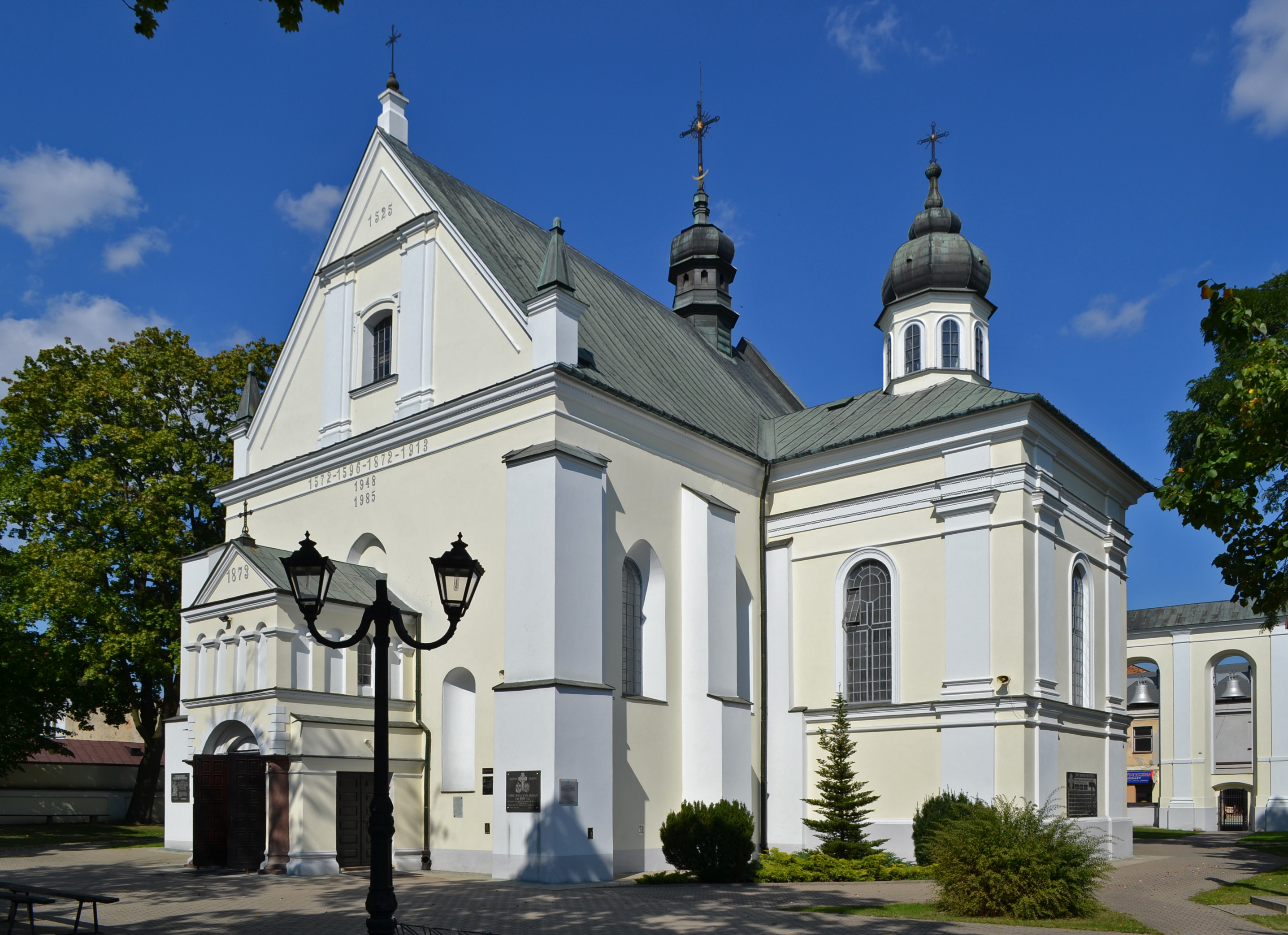
- Liberty Square Castle complex St. Anne's Church

- Flag Coat of arms

- Location within Poland
- Coordinates: 52°2′N 23°7′E
- Country: Poland
- Voivodeship: Lublin
- County: city county
- First mentioned: 1481
- City rights: 1670

Government
  - City mayor: Michał Litwiniuk (PO)

Area
  - Total: 49.40 km^{2} (19.07 sq mi)
- Highest elevation: 150 m (490 ft)
- Lowest elevation: 137 m (449 ft)

Population (31 December 2021)
  - Total: 56,498 ▼
  - Density: 1,144/km^{2} (2,960/sq mi)
- Time zone: UTC+1 (CET)
  - Summer (DST): UTC+2 (CEST)
- Postal code: 21-500 to 21-502, 21-506, 21-527
- Area code: +48 83
- Car plates: LB
- Website: http://bialapodlaska.pl/

Biała Podlaska (Polish: [ˈbjawa pɔdˈlaska]; Latin: Alba Ducalis) is a city in the Lublin Voivodeship in eastern Poland with 56,498 inhabitants as of December 2021. It is the capital of Biała County, although the city is not part of the county (it constitutes a separate city county). The city lies on the Krzna river.

First recorded in the medieval period, Biała Podlaska is a former residential city of the once influential magnate Radziwiłł family, whose landmarks include a Palace and Park ensemble and Renaissance and Baroque churches. It is the location of one of the oldest high schools in Poland, whose student was the most prolific Polish 19th-century writer Józef Ignacy Kraszewski, the birthplace of virtuoso violinist George Bridgetower, a former pioneering centre of faience manufacturing in Poland, and a former aircraft manufacturing centre. It was a place of Nazi German-perpetrated atrocities against Jews, Poles and Italians during the German occupation of Poland in World War II with over 4,000 victims. In 1975–1998, it was the capital of the Biała Podlaska Voivodeship.

== History ==
=== Early history ===
The first historical document mentioning Biała Podlaska dates to 1481. In the beginning, Biała Podlaska belonged to the Illnicz family. The founder of the city may have been Piotr Janowicz, nicknamed "Biały" (Polish for "white"), who was the hetman of the Grand Duchy of Lithuania. Biała Podlaska was administratively part of the Podlaskie Voivodeship, and then the Brest Litovsk Voivodeship in the Grand Duchy of Lithuania (then in union with Poland).

In 1569, Biała Podlaska changed ownership; the new owners were the Radziwiłł family. Under their rule, Biała Podlaska had been growing for two and a half centuries. In 1622, Aleksander Ludwik Radziwiłł built the fortress and the castle. In 1628, Krzysztof Ciborowicz Wilski established Bialska Academy as a regional center of education (since 1633 it was a branch of the Jagiellonian University, then called Kraków Academy). It was one of the best schools in Poland in that time (about 1650–1700). During this time, many churches were erected, as was a hospital.

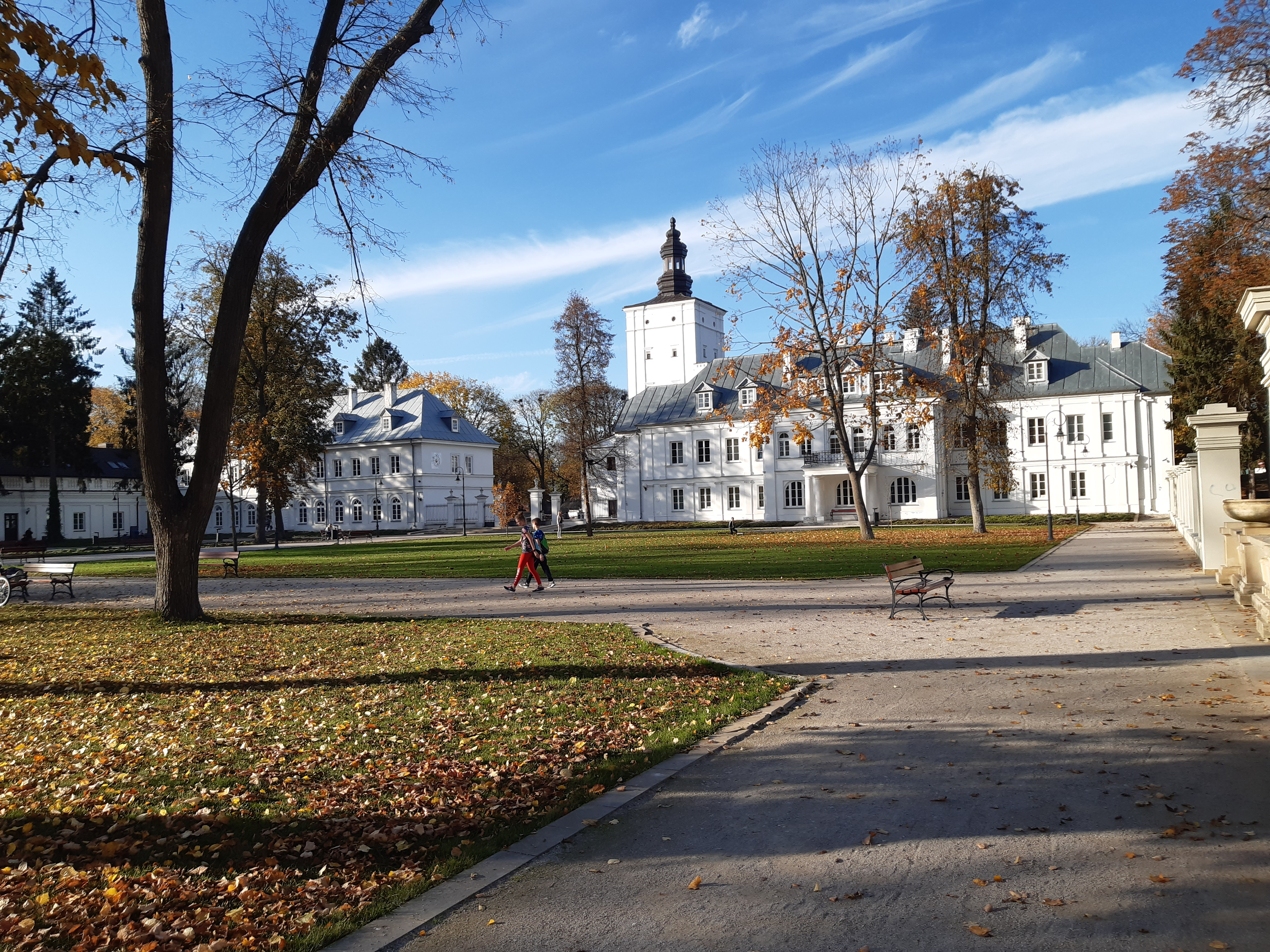
Castle tower and the regional museum at the Radziwiłł park in Biała Podlaska

The prosperity period ended with the Swedish invasion in 1655. Then Biała Podlaska was attacked by Cossacks and Rákóczi armies. The town was significantly destroyed; however, thanks to Michał Kazimierz Radziwiłł and his wife Katarzyna Sobieska, it was rebuilt. In 1670, Michał Kazimierz Radziwiłł gives Biała Podlaska town rights and the coat of arms, which depicts archangel Michael standing on a dragon.

In 1720, Anna Katarzyna Radziwiłłowa began building the tower and the gate - both buildings exist to this day and are the most interesting remains of the castle and palace. In the 18th century, the city and the fortress were times destroyed many times in warfare and rebuilt. The last heir, Dominik Hieronim Radziwiłł, died on 11 November 1813 in France, as a colonel of the Polish army. The palace fell into ruin and was pulled down in 1883.

In 1738, on the initiative of Anna Katarzyna Radziwiłłowa, a faience factory was established in Biała Podlaska, marking the beginning of continuous faience production in Poland. In 1751, a theater was founded that drew foreign artists to Biała Podlaska.

=== Late modern period ===
After the Third Partition of Poland in 1795, Biała Podlaska temporarily came under the rule of Austrian Habsburgs (Austrian partition of Poland). Following the Austro-Polish War of 1809, temporarily recovered by Poles, Biała Podlaska was part of the Polish Duchy of Warsaw. In 1815, the town became part of Congress Poland within the Russian Partition of Poland. In the 1820s, Józef Ignacy Kraszewski, the most prolific Polish writer of the 19th century, attended the local school. He wrote his first work and edited the school newspaper in Biała Podlaska, and later, he featured the city in his several of his novels. In the 1880s, another prominent Polish writer, Stefan Żeromski, visited the city several times. At the end of the 19th century, Biała Podlaska was a large garrison town of the Imperial Russian Army. Near the intersection of Brzeska Street and Aleje Tysiclecia Avenue is a cemetery for soldiers killed during World War I.

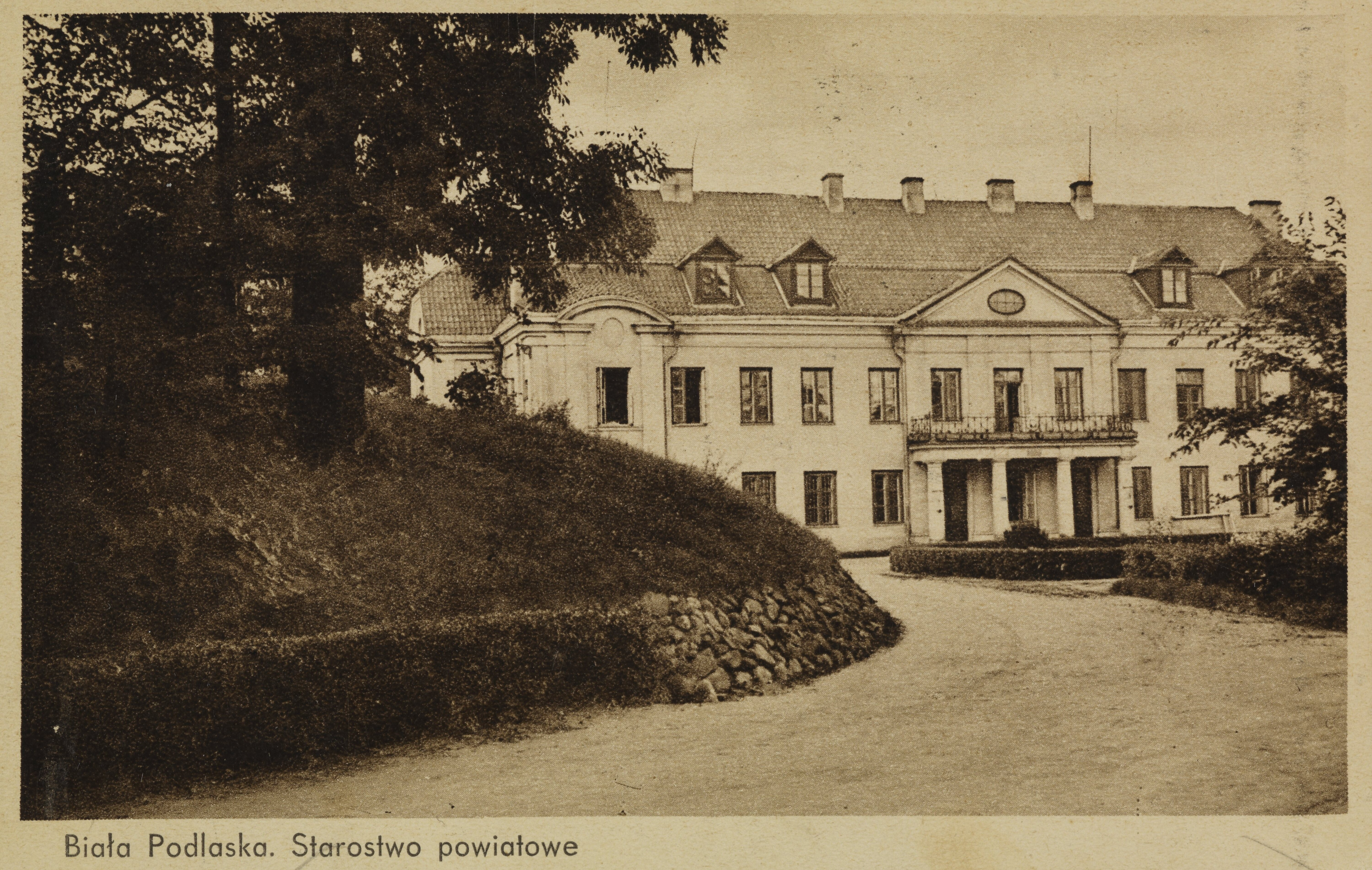
County office in 1937

In 1918, following World War I, Poland regained independence and the town was reunited with Poland. During the Second Polish Republic in the interwar period, Biała Podlaska was growing fast. The town was the seat of the Podlaska Wytwórnia Samolotów (PWS), an important aircraft factory.

There was also a garrison of the 34th infantry regiment of the Polish Armed Forces. The regiment, formed in 1919, fought successfully in the Polish–Soviet War, and also fought against Germans and Soviets during the invasion of Poland, which started World War II in 1939. During the Polish–Soviet War, on 1 August 1920, Russians invaded the city, but were quickly repelled by the Poles, and later on they invaded again, before the town was eventually liberated by the Polish 1st Legions Infantry Division on 17 August 1920. The last commander of the regiment, lieutenant colonel Wacław Budrewicz, was taken prisoner of war by the Soviets and murdered by them in the 1940 Katyn massacre, in which also many Polish teachers and policemen from the city, and alumni of local schools were murdered.

=== World War II ===
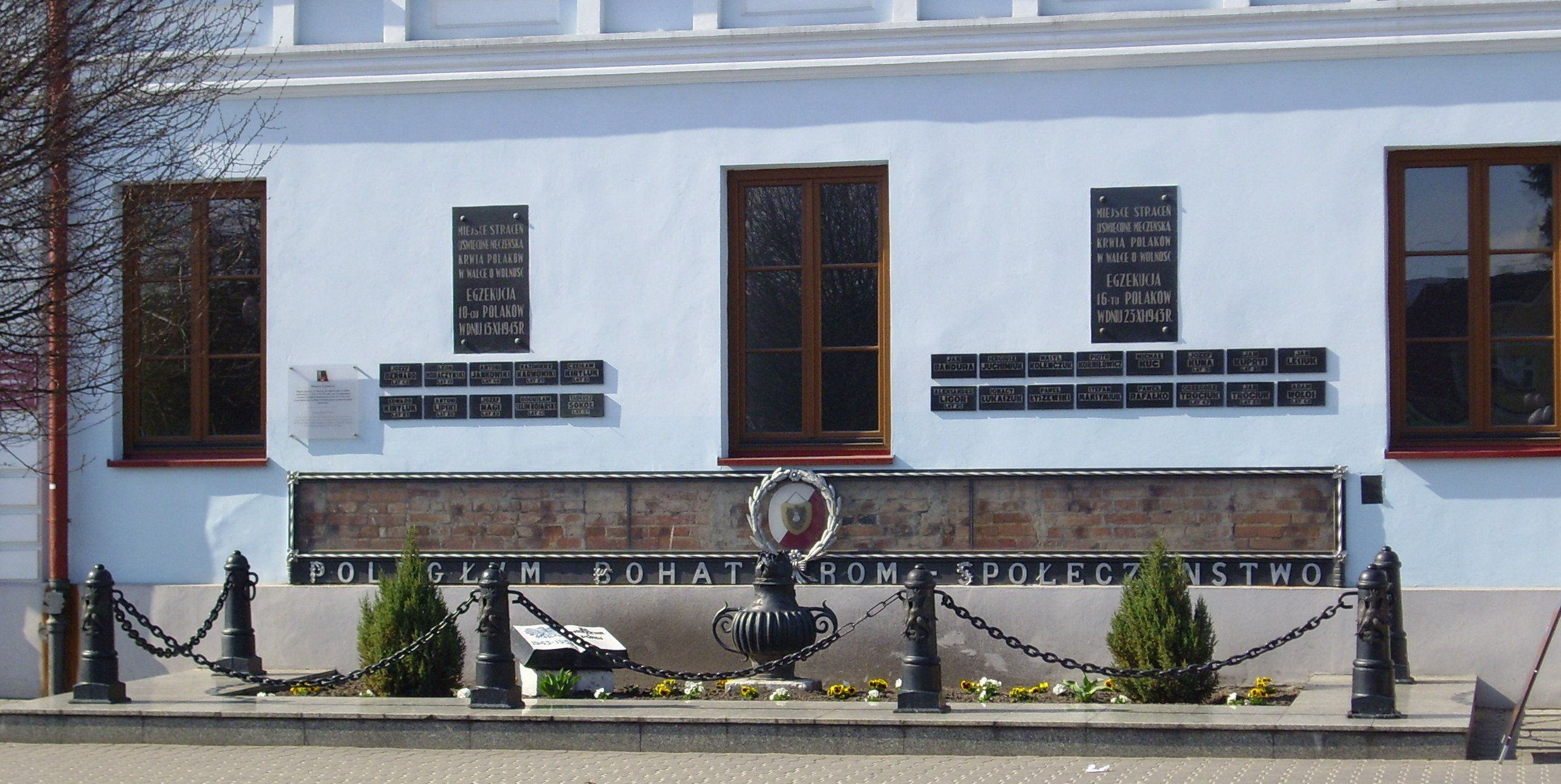
Memorial at the site of public executions of Poles carried out by the Germans in November 1943

World War II halted the town's development because of Nazi and Soviet repression. The Germans captured Biała Podlaska on 13 September 1939, but withdrew on 26 September to allow the Soviets to station in the town. But, on 10 October 1939, in accordance with the terms of the Molotov–Ribbentrop Pact, the Soviets departed and the town was reoccupied by the Germans. By that time, the Soviets had already completely plundered the PWS aircraft factory, so that nothing but empty buildings remained.

Poles expelled by the Germans in 1939–1940 from various places in German-annexed western Poland were deported to the area, while their previous homes were handed over to German colonists as part of the Lebensraum policy. In March and July 1940, the Germans imprisoned dozens of Poles in the local prison, and then massacred them in the nearby Grabarka forest. Local starost (head of county administration) Mieczysław Lutman was murdered by the Russians in the Katyn massacre in 1940. Over 40 Polish teachers were arrested in the town on 24 June 1940, imprisoned in Lublin and then deported to concentration camps, as part of the AB-Aktion. On 5 July 1940 the Germans carried out another massacre of Poles in Grabarka, whom they previously imprisoned in the town. Further massacres of Poles were carried out by the Germans throughout the war. Despite such circumstances, the Polish resistance movement was active in the city.

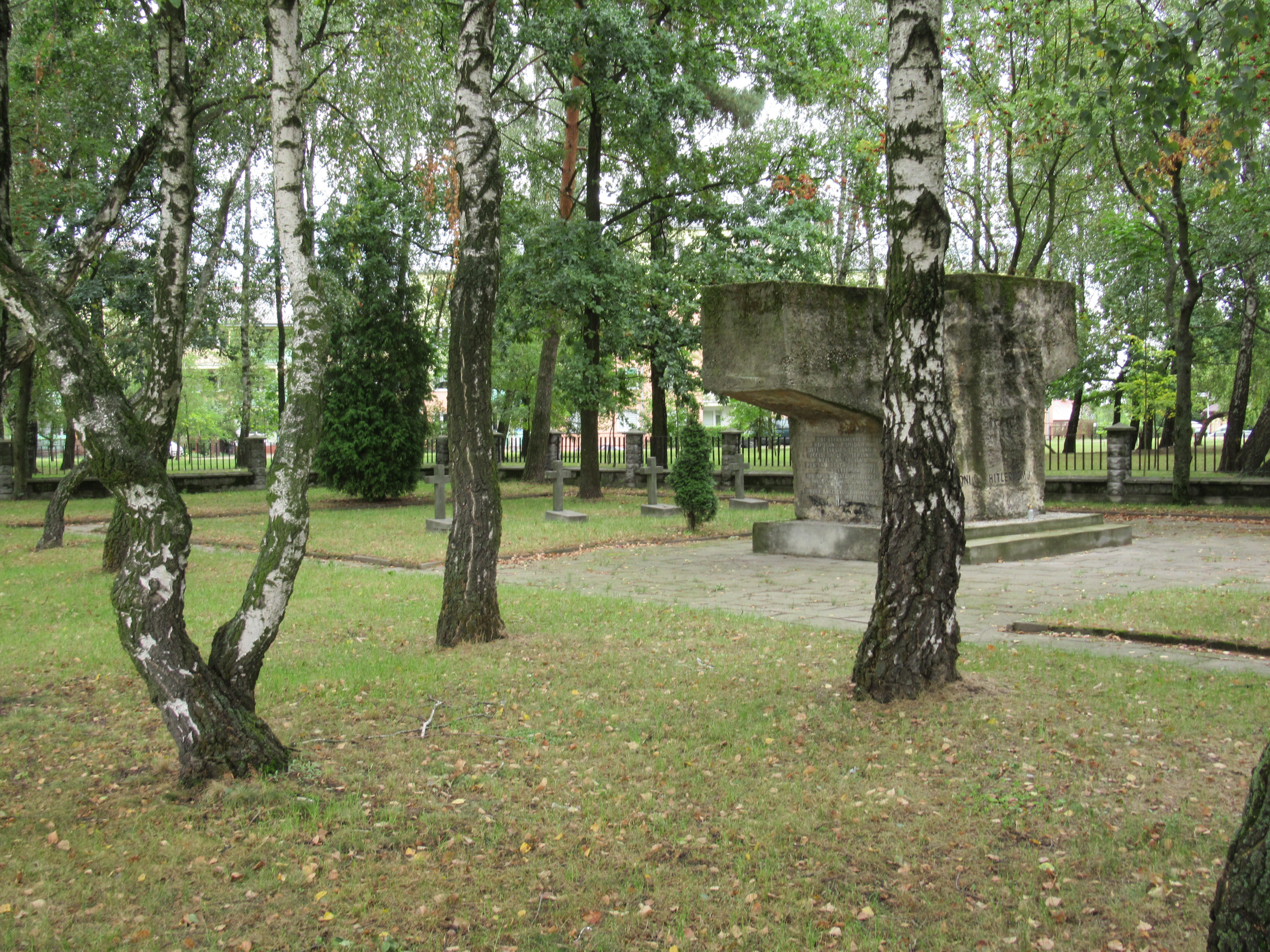
Cemetery of 406 Italian prisoners killed by the Germans in 1943–1944

After Germany attacked the Soviets in Operation Barbarossa, a German prisoner-of-war camp was set up near Biała Podlaska for Soviet and Polish POWs. In 1942, they were replaced by some 600 French POWs brought from Rawa Ruska, who were soon relocated to a camp in nearby Hola. In 1943, after Italian surrender to the Allies, Italian Military Internees were brought to the city and placed in a local subcamp of the Stalag 366 POW camp. The Germans subjected the Italians to mass starvation, epidemics, harassment and beatings, and over 400 Italians died in the camp. Poles provided food to starving Italians, despite the threat of being shot on sight by German guards, for both Italians and Poles for such attempts, with confirmed cases of such killings. There was also a forced labour subcamp for some 200–300 Italian POWs in the city.

On 12 April 1944, the 14th Waffen Grenadier Division of the SS, composed of Ukrainian nationalists collaborating with Germany, pacified the present-day district of Sielczyk, burning twelve houses and murdering nine Polish men and women.

In 1944 the town was recaptured by Polish and Soviet troops and restored to Poland, although with a Soviet-installed communist regime, which remained in power until the Fall of Communism in 1989.

=== Recent history ===
In the postwar period and after the fall of communism, Biała Podlaska has developed as a more modern city. It retains many of the historic features in the central Polish old town of the city. From 1975 to 1999 Biała Podlaska was a capital of the voivodeship, later it again became a city county, as before 1975.

=== History of the Jewish community ===
The first mention of Jewish settlement in Biała Podlaska dates from 1621, when 30 Jewish families were granted rights of residence there. By 1841, there were 2,200 Jews of a total population of 3,588 in the town. In 1897, the number was 6,549 out of 13,090 inhabitants. In the 19th century, the chasidic movement established strong roots in Biała Podlaska.

A descendant of the Yid Hakodosh of Przysucha formed the Biala chasidic court, which survives to this day with communities in London, and cities in the United States and Israel. The chasidim of Kotsk also had a large presence in Biała Podlaska, some of whom later became Gerrer chasidim. In sovereign Poland by 1931, the Jews constituted 64.7% of the total population, or 6,923 out of 10,697 citizens. Four Yiddish newspapers were published locally between the two world wars.

The Germans captured Biała Podlaska on 13 September 1939 during the invasion of Poland but withdrew on 26 September. On 10 October 1939, the Soviets handed the town back to the Germans when the line of demarcation was finally set up. Around 600 Jews escaped the town during the Soviet departure. The Germans formed a Judenrat in November 1939, which set up a public kitchen and a Jewish infirmary. By the end of the year, the Nazis began to impose discriminatory restrictions against the Jews. On 1 December 1939, they decreed that all Jews had to wear a yellow Star of David. Jews were ordered to move into an open-type ghetto along the Grabanów, Janowa, Prosta and Przechodnia streets, and a Jewish Ghetto Police was established. At the end of 1939, some 2,000 to 3,000 more Jews were brought there as a result of deportations from Suwałki and Serock. The overcrowding and poor sanitations resulted in a typhus epidemic in Biała Podlaska in early 1940, causing many deaths. The Germans imprisoned some Poles in the local prison and then deported them to concentration camps for helping and rescuing Jews.

Several hundred more Jews were brought in from as far as Kraków and Mława during German "resettlement" actions conducted in 1940 and 1941. The men were sent to new labour camps in the Wola district at an airfield, the train station, and elsewhere. Hundreds were forced to pave roads, drain ditches, construct sewage lines and build barracks. Many Jewish women worked in the Nazi farms. In March 1942 the ghetto had 8,400 inmates.

==== The Holocaust ====
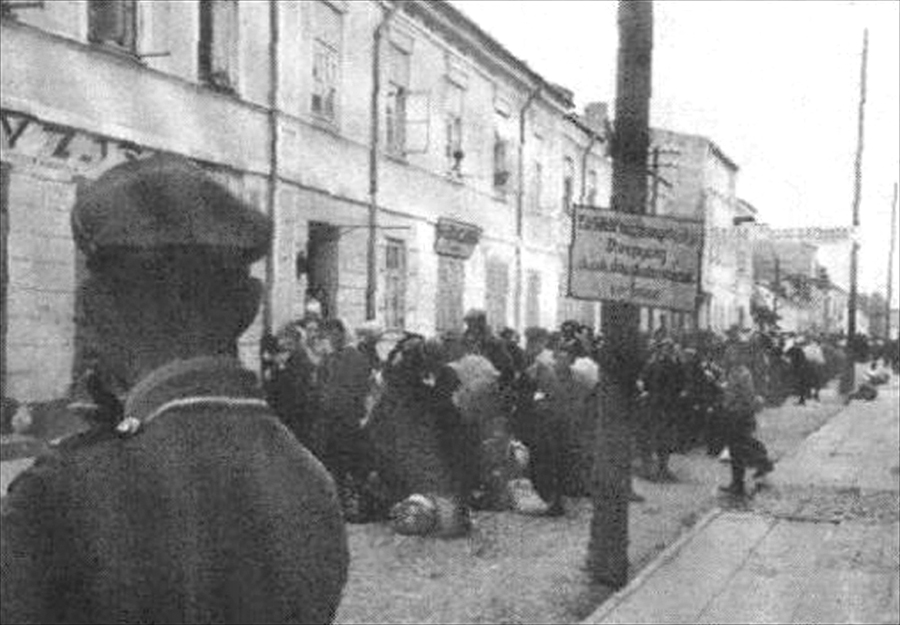
Biała Podlaska Ghetto liquidation action conducted in 1942

After the launch of Operation Reinhard on 6 June 1942– the code name for the most deadly phase of the Holocaust in occupied Poland – the Jews were told to prepare for "resettlement". Only workers from the forced labour camps possessing labour permits were to be exempt from the deportation. On 10 June 1942, some 3,000 Jews, including women with children, were assembled in the synagogue courtyard. Many Jews fled to the forests. The assembled Jews were led by the German police to the train station. The next day the prisoners were packed into deportation trains and sent to Sobibór extermination camp. All were gassed.

In September 1942, some 3,000 Jews from the neighbouring towns of Janów and Konstantynów were brought into Biała Podlaska Ghetto. The overcrowding became desperate. The Jews sensed that the ghetto was slated for liquidation. Many escaped to the forests; others prepared hiding places in the basements. On 6 October 1942, the Germans deported about 1,200 Jews from the local labour camps to Międzyrzec Podlaski Ghetto. The subsequent "deportation actions" conducted by the Nazi German Reserve Police Battalion 101, augmented by the Ukrainian Trawnikis, lasted throughout October and November 1942. In total, some 10,800 Jews from around Biała Podlaska and its county were murdered at the Treblinka extermination camp, 125 kilometres (78 mi) away, or massacred on the spot during roundups.

Chil Rajchman, a Sonderkommando who survived the Treblinka revolt and the war, later testified that he witnessed a transport of 6,000 Jews from Biała Podlaska arrive at Treblinka. When the sealed doors were opened, 90 percent of prisoners – men, women, and children – were already dead inside. Their bodies were thrown into smouldering mass grave at the "Lazaret".

The remaining Jews of Biała Podlaska were sent to a transit point at the Międzyrzec Podlaski Ghetto for deportations to death camps. In July 1943 the transit ghetto in Międzyrzec was liquidated. All its inmates were deported to Majdanek and Treblinka, where they were murdered in the gas chambers. The Nazis left a small group of 300 Jewish slave labourers in Biała Podlaska to clean up the decaying ghetto area. In May 1944, the surviving workers were murdered at Majdanek. Biała Podlaska was captured by the Red Army on 26 July 1944. Only 300 of the Jews who had lived in Biała Podlaska are known to have survived the Holocaust. Most of them left Poland after the war.

==== Remembrance ====
The parts of the city which were originally the Jewish "quarter" still exist. The Jewish community is commemorated by a memorial erected at the site of the Jewish cemetery, which was destroyed by the Nazis. Another memorial was recently erected by Jewish survivors from the town who now live in the USA. Two former private prayer houses of the Jewish community are still in existence. The cemetery otherwise stands as a reminder of the hole that was ripped out of Biała Podlaska life by the Holocaust and loss of so many Jews. Apart from Israel, Melbourne in Australia has the largest number of Jewish survivors from Biała Podlaska - all now very aged.

== Culture and tourism ==
Popular points of interest include the Old Town, as well as St. Anne's Church built in 1572, St. Anthony's Church from 1672 to 1684, Church of the Nativity of the Blessed Virgin Mary built in 1759, and the historic building Academy of Biała from 1628.

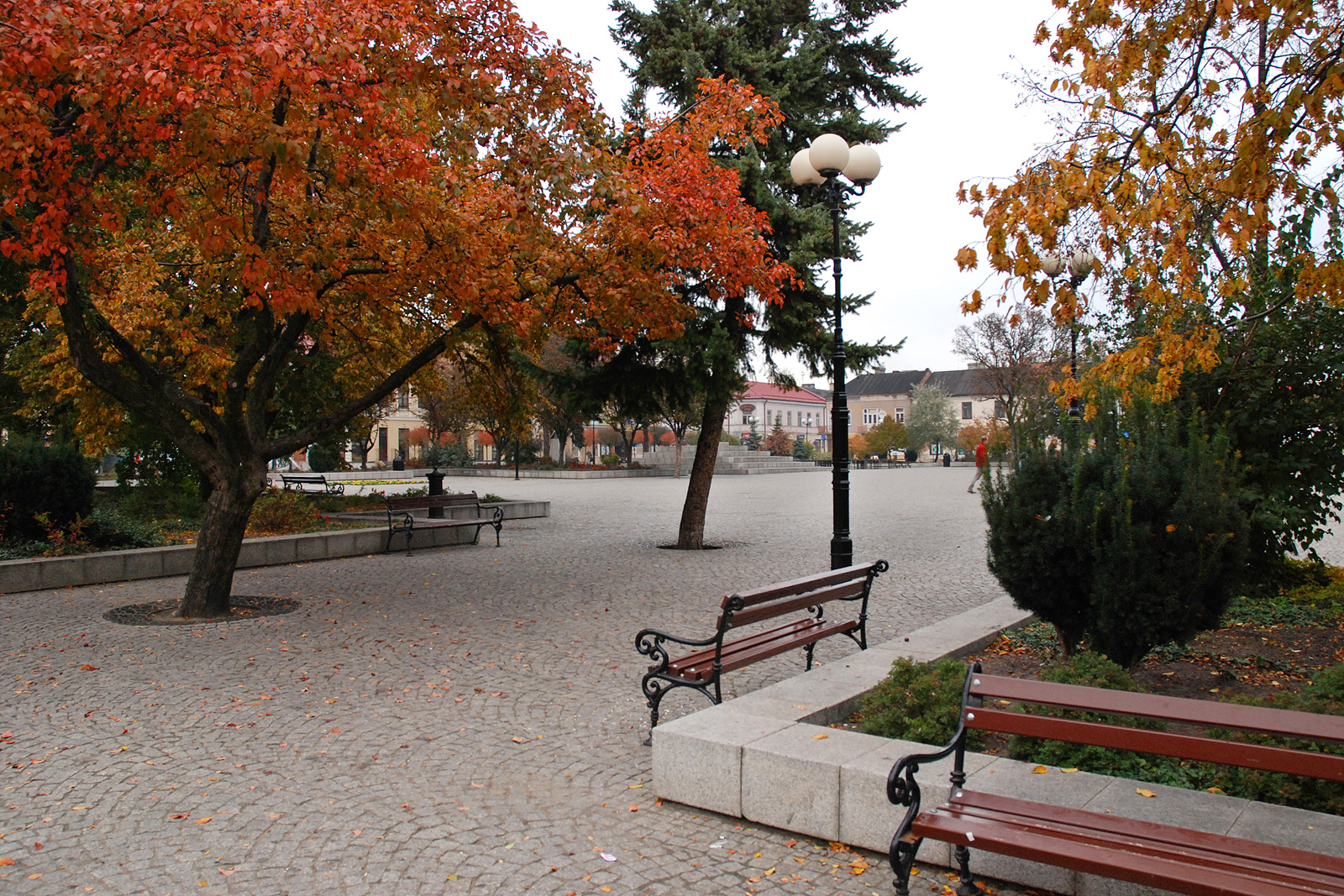
Liberty Square

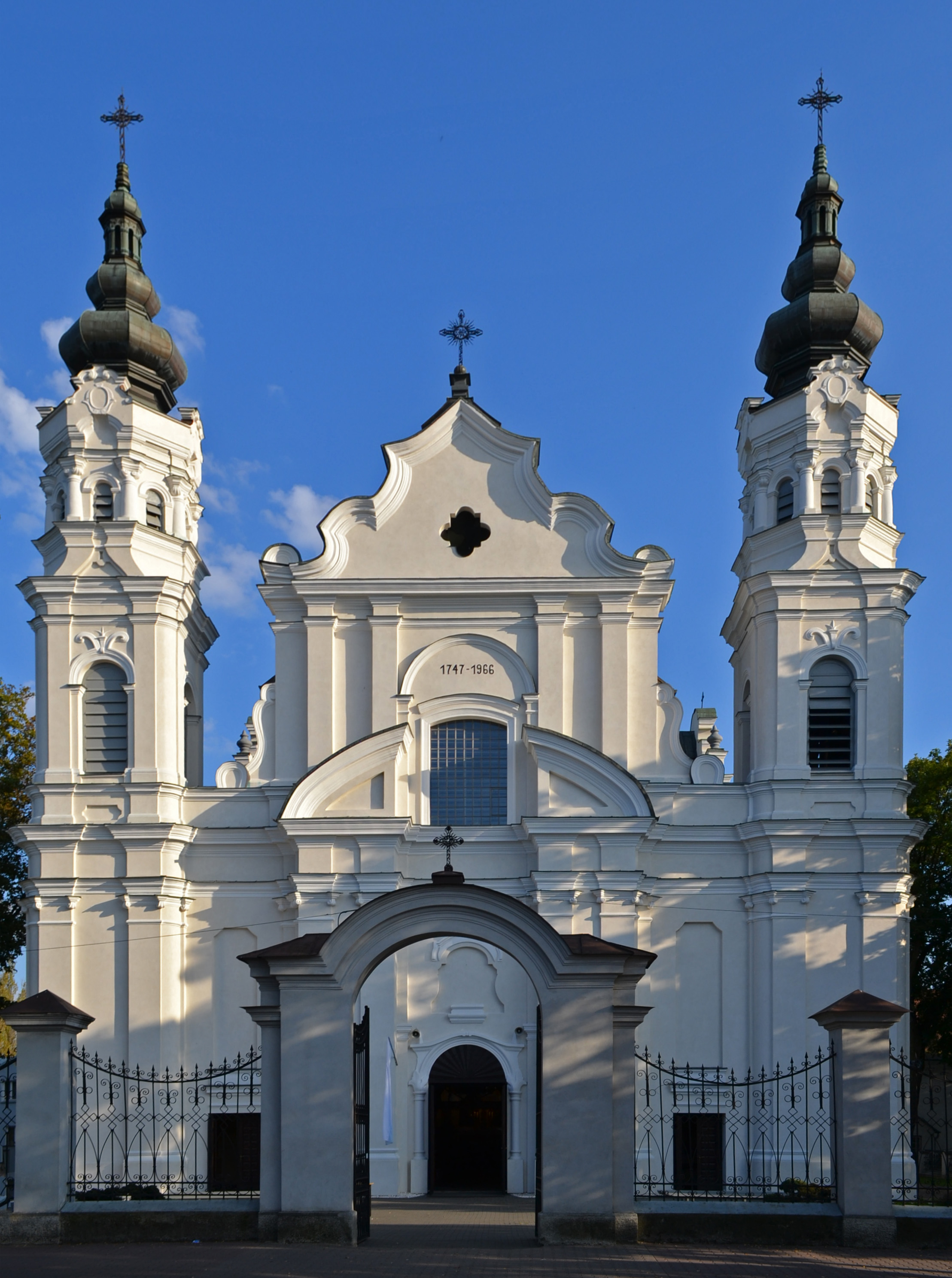
Baroque Virgin Mary Church

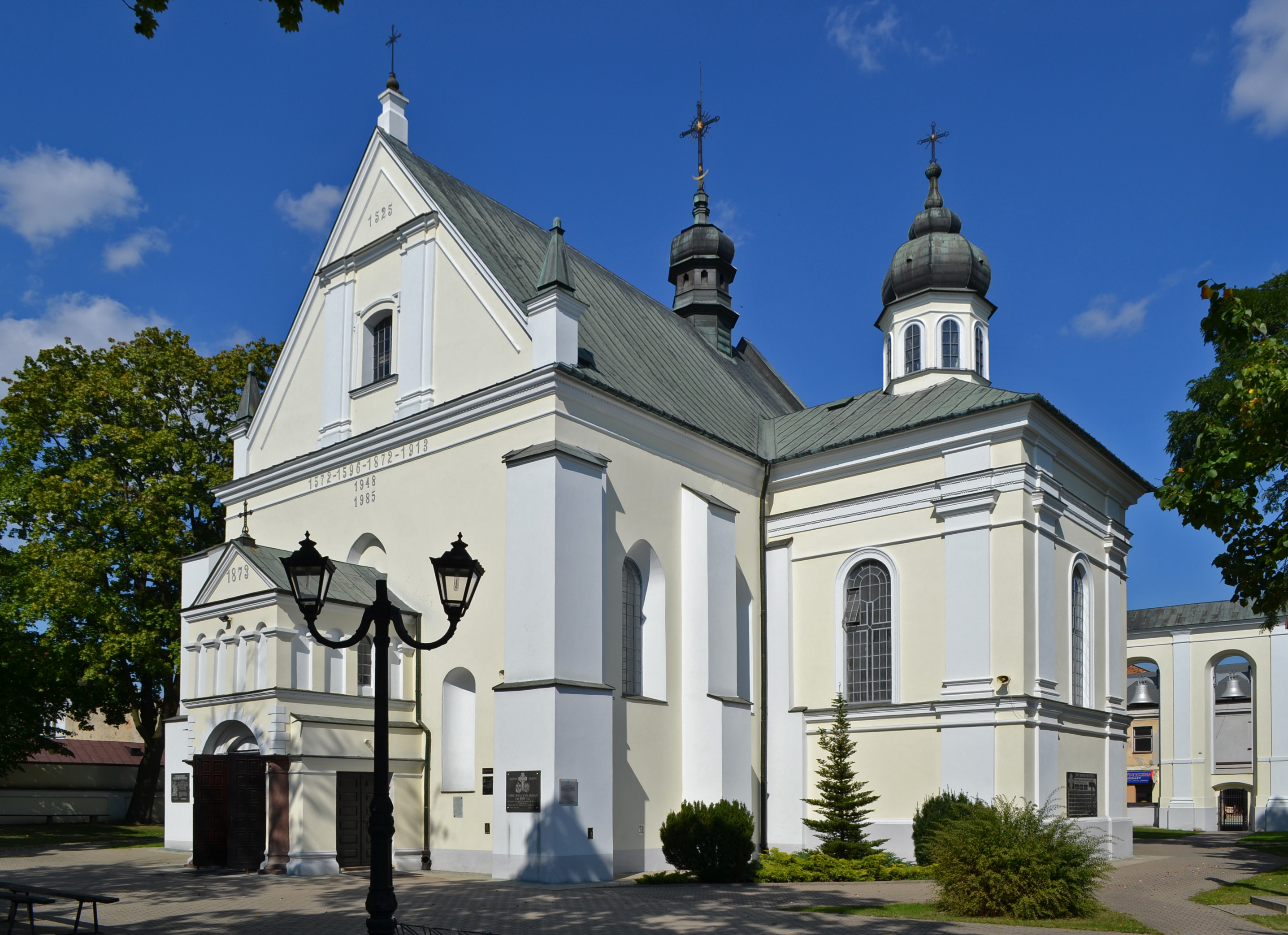
St. Anne's Church, built in 1572

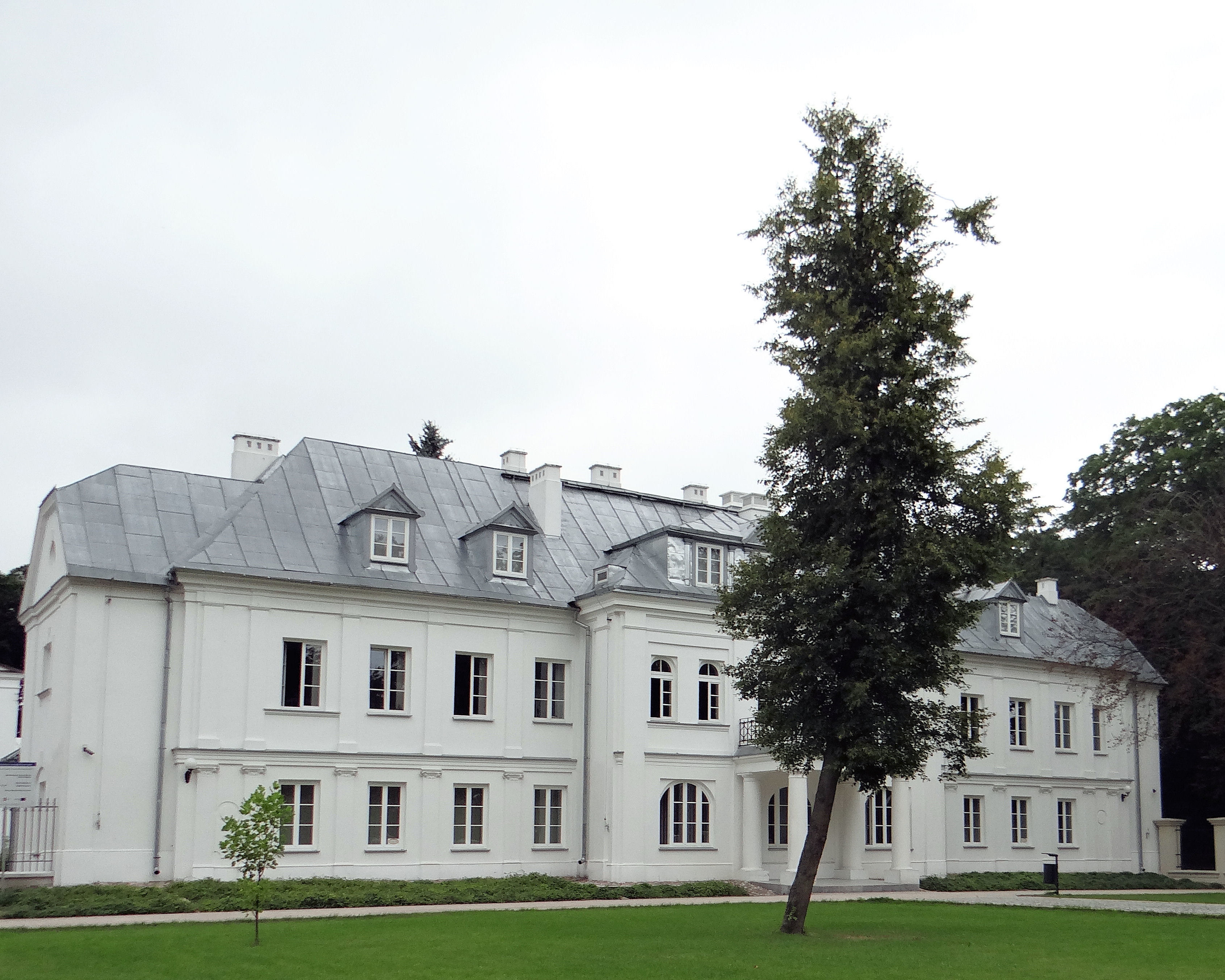
Eastern outbuilding of the castle, now housing a library

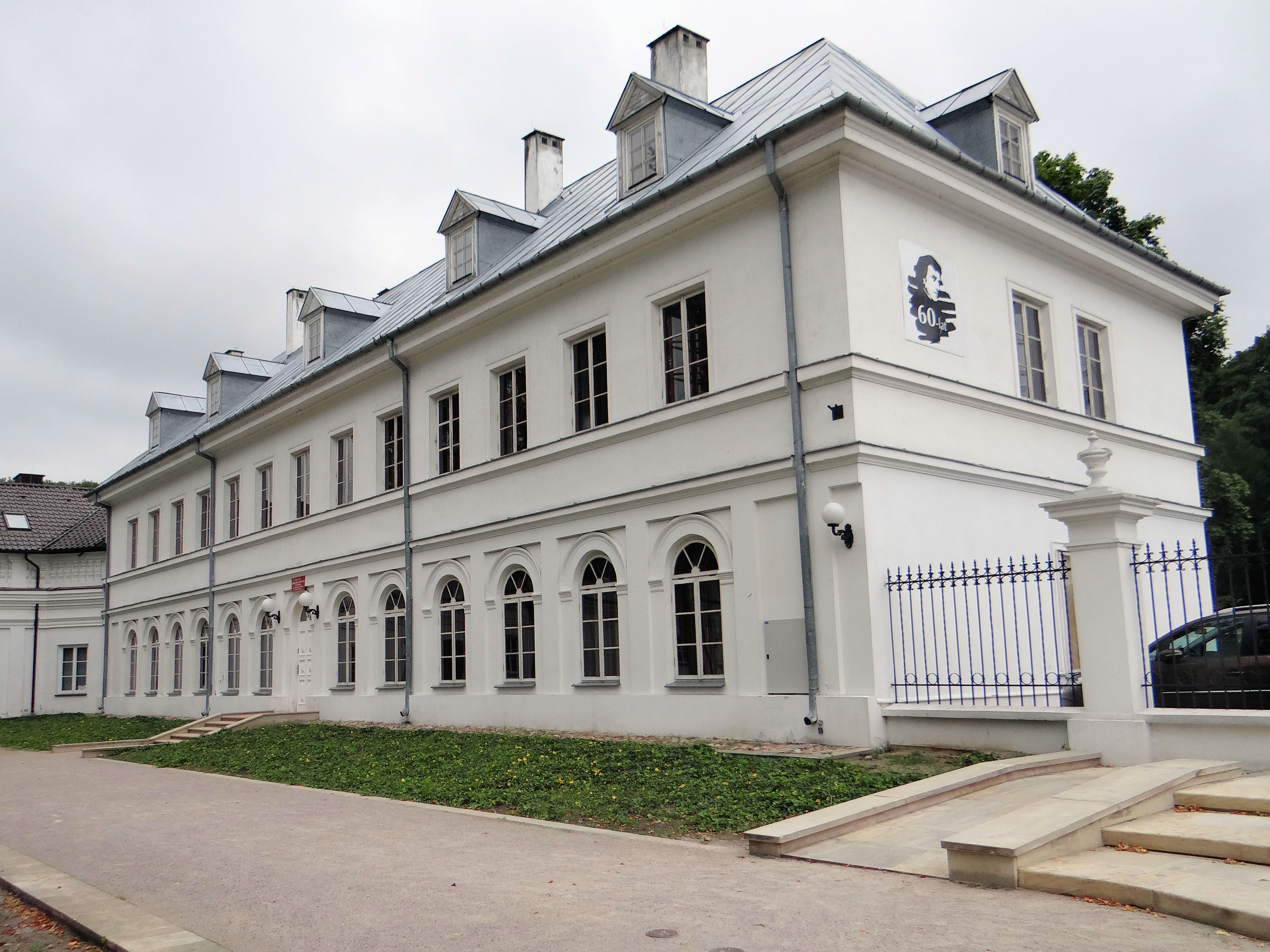
Western outbuilding of the castle, now housing a music school

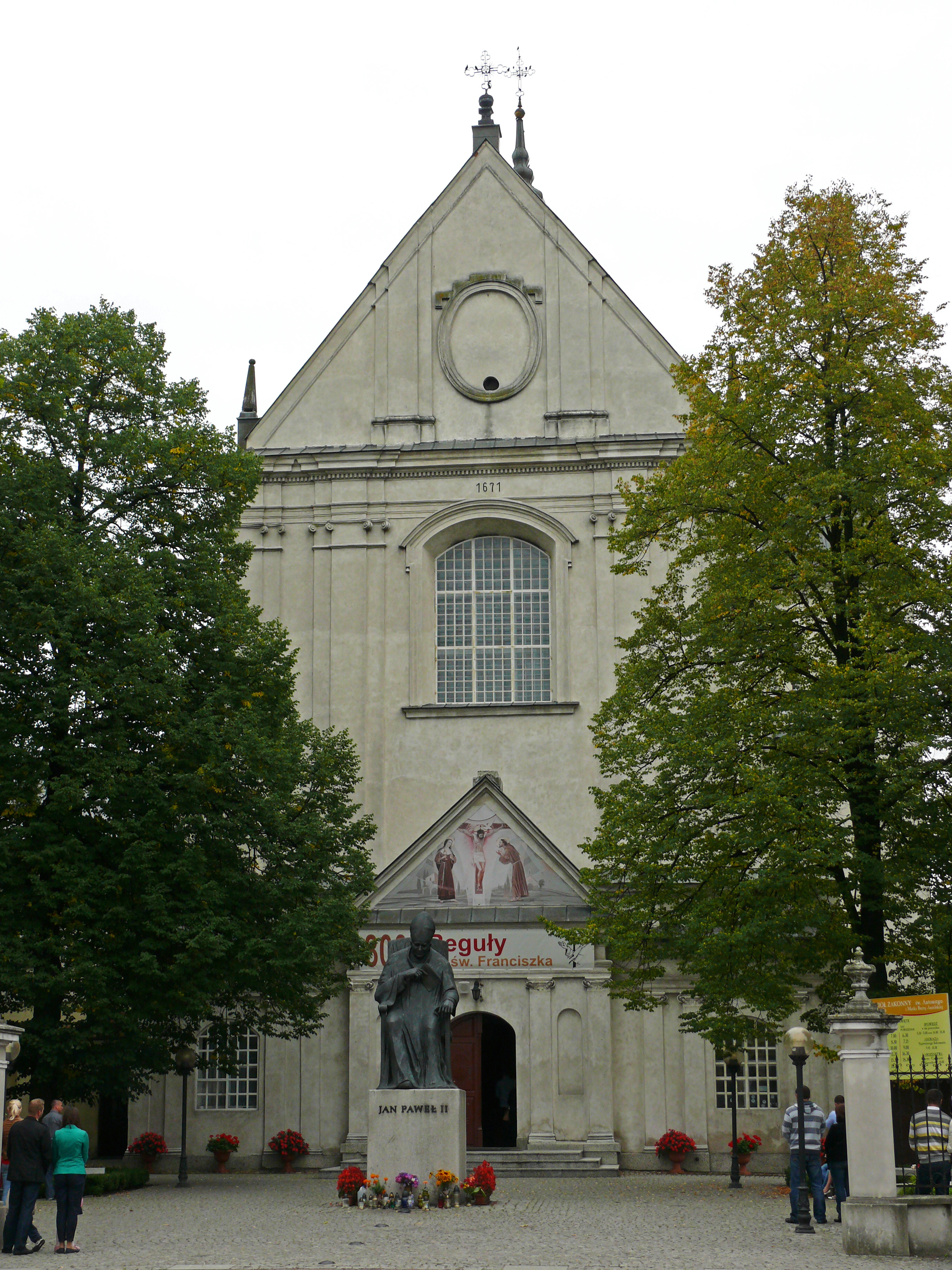
Baroque St. Anthony Church and Pope John Paul II Monument

Popular museums include the most important Muzeum Południowego Podlasia (Museum of Southern Podlasie, founded in 1924), as well as the Oddział Martyrologiczno-Historyczny (Martyrology and Historic Division, since 1973, in the World War II Gestapo jail at Łomaska 21 Street).

Among the local art galleries are the Galeria Podlaska, Galeria Ulica Krzywa (Crooked Street Gallery), Bialskie Centrum Kultury (the Biała Podlaska Cultural Center), and Galeria Autorska Jakusza Maksymiuka (Janusz Maksymiuk's Gallery).

There are two popular cinemas in Biała Podlaska including Novekino Merkury - 1 hall, 282 seats, digital cinema 3D, as well as Cinema 3D - multiplex situated in Rywal Shopping Center; 4 halls; digital cinema 3D, 4K (Ultra HD). Plays are staged in the auditorium of the Pope John II State School of Higher Education in Biała Podlaska and in amphitheater in Radziwiłł park.

There are also several cultural centers in the city including Bialskie Centrum Kultury, Scena, Piast, and Eureka.

=== Festivals ===
- Days of Biała Podlaska
- Podlasie Jazz Festival
- Biała Blues Festival
- Art Of Fun Festival
- Podlaska Jesień Teatralna (en. Podlasie Theatrical Autumn)

== Transport ==
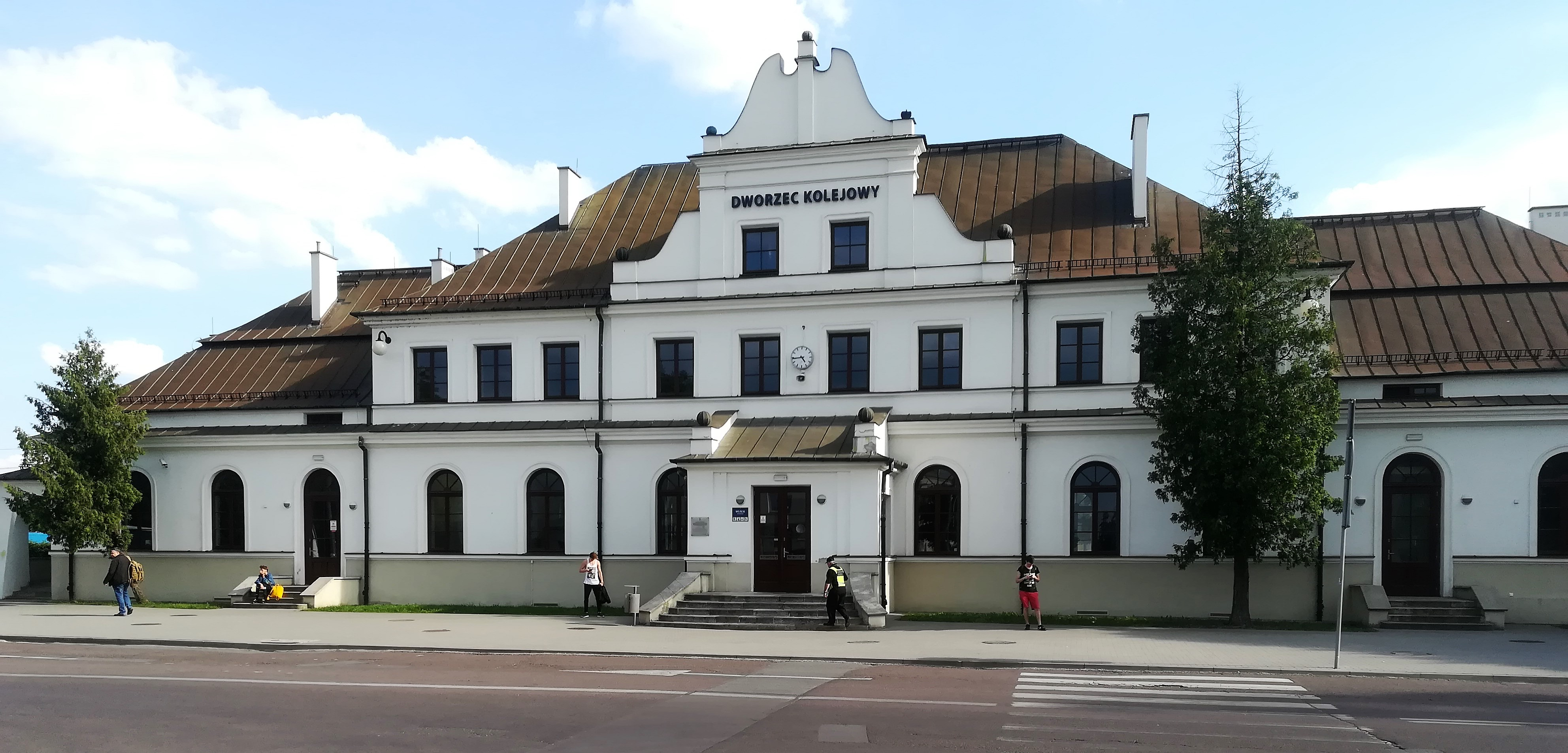
Main railway station

The city is a major transport hub: national road 2, which is also the european route E30, two voivodeship roads (DW811, DW812) and national railway line 2, pass through the town.

Biała Podlaska has its own bus lines. The organizer of the communication is the Management of Urban Transport (Polish: ZKM - Zarząd Komunikacji Miejskiej). Buses operate 8 lines marked with letters from "A" to "H" (frequency approx. 30 min). On the basis of an agreement between the neighboring villages, buses carry courses outside the administrative boundaries of the city.

The Biała Podlaska Airport has one of the longest runways in Poland. The airport was used for military purposes, however since 2020 the airport is closed.

=== Roads ===
- National road 2 / European route E30: Terespol - Biała Podlaska - Warsaw - Poznań - Świecko
- 811 - voivodeship road: Biała Podlaska - Konstantynów - Sarnaki
- 812 - voivodeship road: Biała Podlaska - Wisznice - Chełm - Krasnystaw

== Government ==
As of 2022, the city mayor of Biała Podlaska is Michał Litwiniuk.

== Education ==
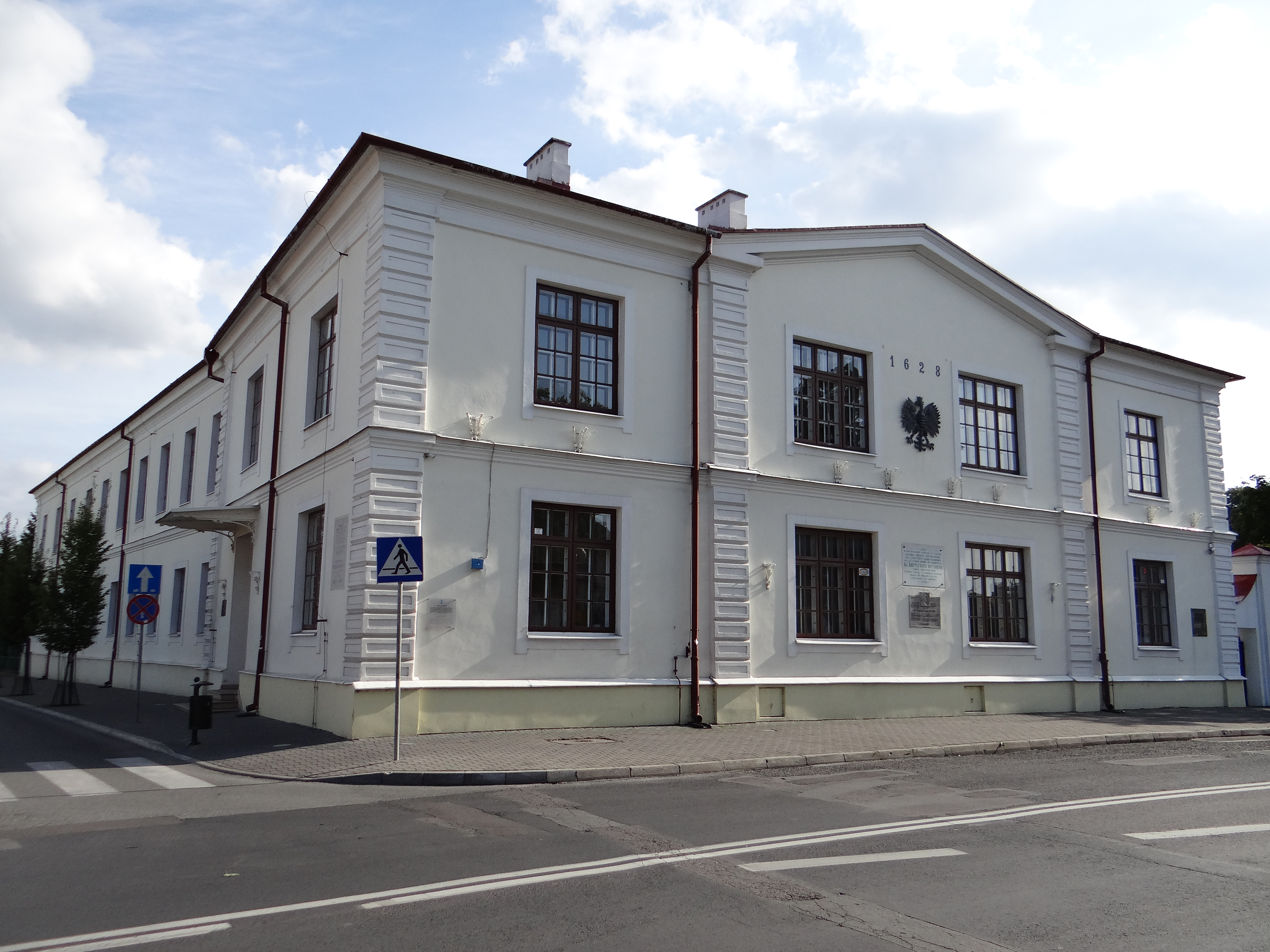
Józef Ignacy Kraszewski High School No. 1, one of the oldest high schools in Poland

There are about a dozen primary schools in the city. The secondary schools include six public schools and one Catholic Secondary School named after Cyprian Norwid. Among the local secondary schools are the High School No. 1 named after Józef Ignacy Kraszewski, the High School No. 2 named after Emilia Plater, the Adam Mickiewicz High School No. 3, High School No. 4 named after Stanisław Staszic, and the Catholic High School named after Cyprian Norwid.

=== State universities ===
- Państwowa Szkoła Wyższa im. Papieża Jana Pawła II w Białej Podlaskiej
- Branch of the Kazimierz Pułaski Technical University of Radom
- Faculty of the Józef Piłsudski University of Physical Education in Warsaw

== Media ==
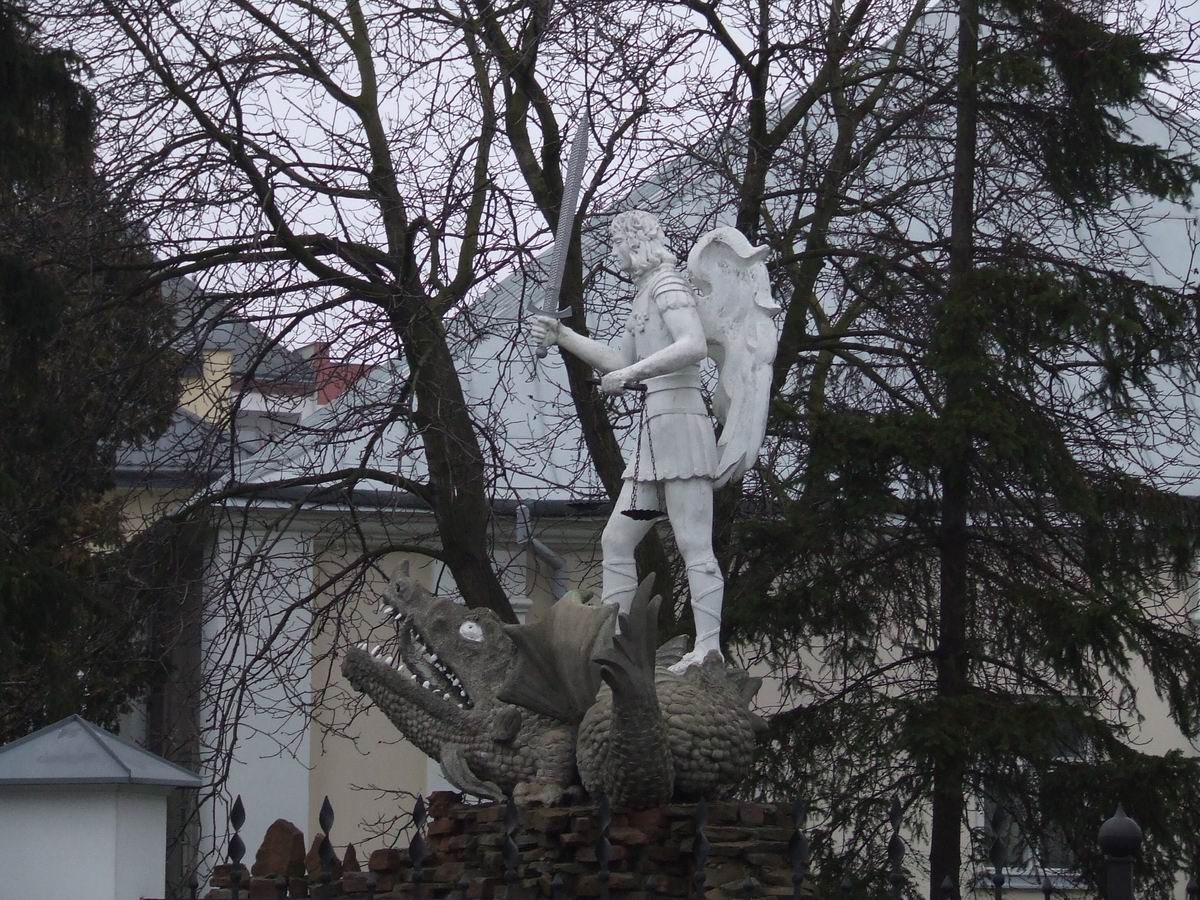
Sculpture of archangel Michael slaying the dragon

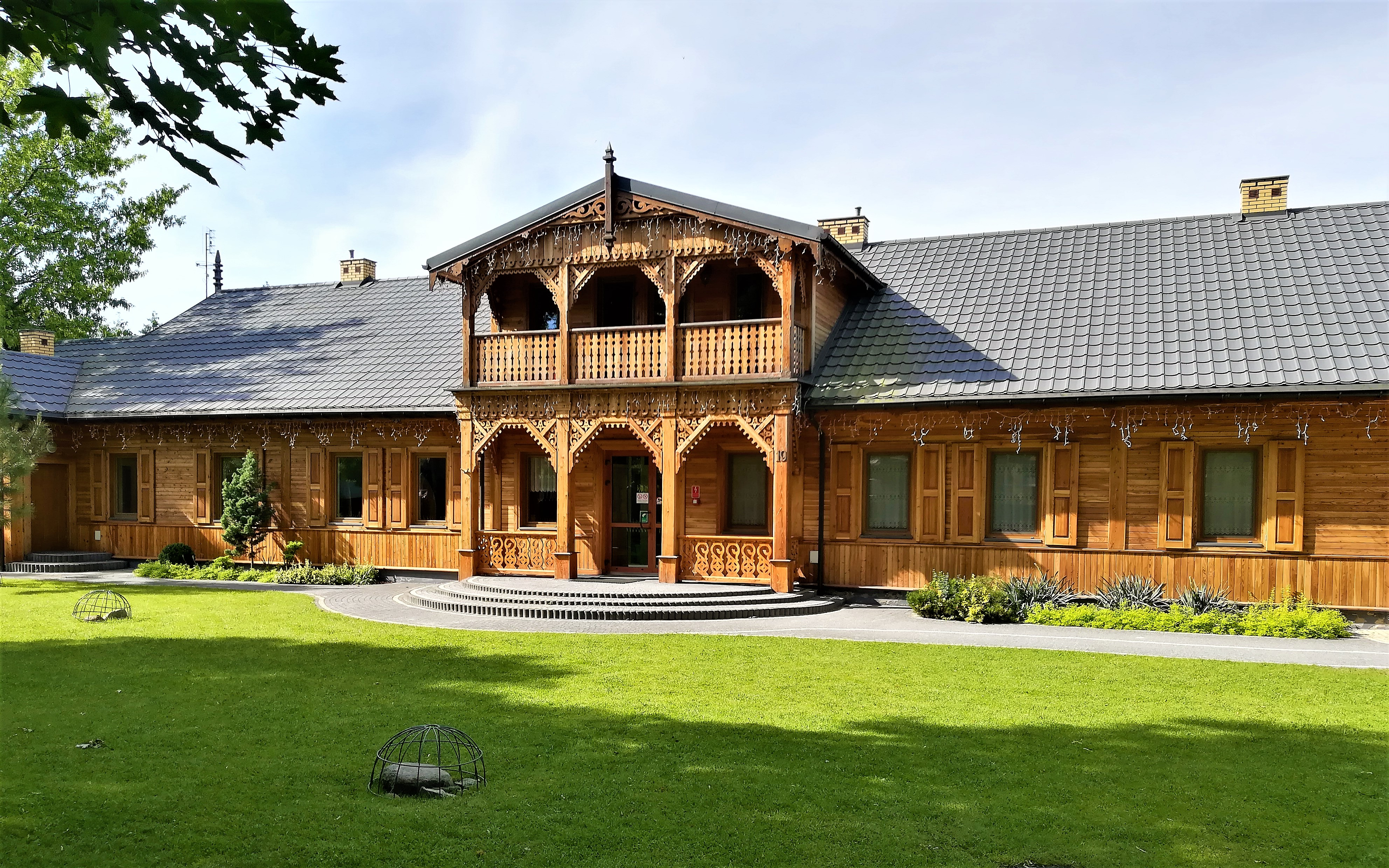
Kindergarten

News websites hailing from the city include biala24.pl, bialanonstop.pl, bialasiedzieje.pl, slowopodlasia.pl, tygodnikpodlaski.pl, Bialczanin.eu, Radiobiper.info, and Interwizja.edu.pl.

Local TV stations include:

- Biała Podlaska TV – channel available on cable TV Vectra (in both digital and analog technology)
- TVP Lublin – channel available in MUX-3 DVB-T
- Interwizja – internet TV
- biala.tv
- pulsmiasta.pl

Among the local radio stations are:

- Polskie Radio Lublin 93.1 FM (Broadcast from Biała Podlaska)
- Katolickie Radio Podlasie 101.7 FM (Broadcast from Łosice transmitter)
- Radio Biper (Internet radio)

National radio transmissions are broadcast through the Łosice transmitter. They include:

- Polskie Radio Jedynka (88.3 FM)
- Polskie Radio Trójka (90.5 FM)
- RMF FM (91.9 FM)
- Radio ZET (105.4 FM)
- Polskie Radio RDC (103.4 FM)

Broadcast directly from Biała Podlaska include:

- Radio Maryja (87.8 FM / 107.7 FM also from Łosice transmitter)
- Polskie Radio Dwójka (98.3 FM)
- Belarusian Radio Racja (99.2 FM) - radio for the Belarusian minority in Poland

Among the newspapers published locally are:

- Słowo Podlasia
- Tygodnik Podlaski
- Biała Się Dzieje na papierze
- Kurier Bialski
- Dziennik Wschodni
- Życie Bialskie

=== Films and programs made in Biała Podlaska ===
- Smoleńsk - film, which tells the story of the Smolensk plane crash on 10 April 2010. Scenes were recorded at airport in Biała Podlaska.
- To nie koniec świata! (Eng. It's not the end of the world!) - TV series broadcast on Polsat
- K2 - Kierowców dwóch - automotive program by TVN Turbo. Some episodes are recorded on Biala Podlaska Airport

== Sports and recreation ==
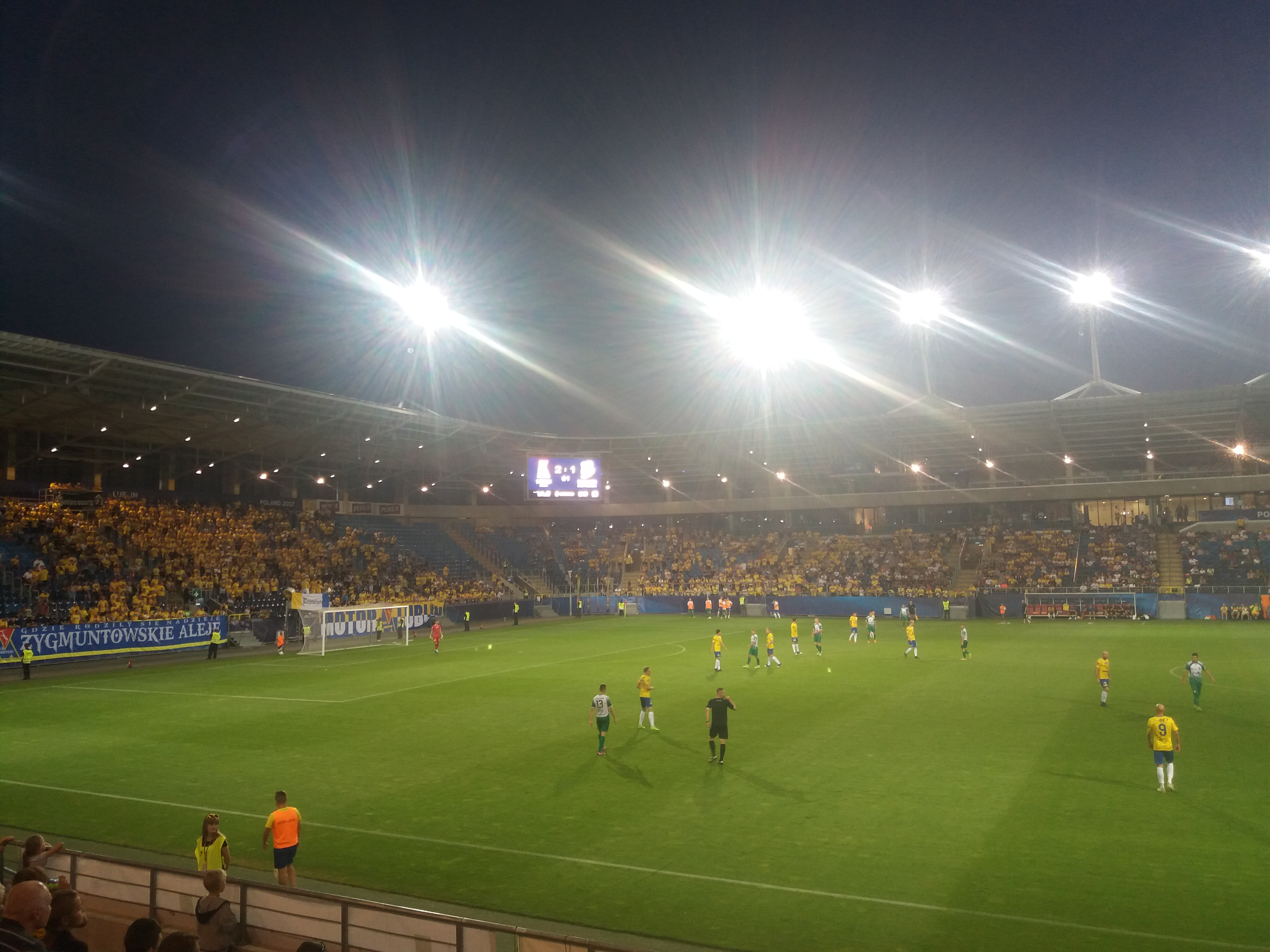
Away game of Podlasie Biała Podlaska with Motor Lublin, 2017

Sport facilities in Biała Podlaska include 4 stadiums, 3 swimming pools, and a popular tennis court. Recreation facilities include also public spaces such as Radziwiłł Park and promenade at Plac Wolności (the Freedom Square).

=== Sections and clubs ===
- AZS-AWF Biała Podlaska – handball, basketball, gymnastics, swimming, volleyball, weightlifting
- Podlasie Biała Podlaska – men's soccer
- KU AZS PSW Biała Podlaska – women's soccer, men's handball
- Bialskopodlaski Klub Jeździecki – horsemanship
- UKS TOP-54 – men's soccer, handball, korfball, cheerleaders, billiards
- UKS Piątka plus – handball, billiard
- UKS Jagiellończyk – soccer, athletics, gymnastics, women's volleyball
- UKS Orlik-2 – women's basketball, men's soccer
- UKS Serbinów (men's volleyball)
- SKS Szóstka (women's volleyball)
- UKS Olimpia – basketball, taekwon-do, soccer
- UKS Kraszak – men's handball, basketball
- UKS TATAMI – judo
- Międzyszkolny Klub Sportowy ŻAK
- Klub Żeglarski Biała Podlaska
- Bialski Klub Sportowy GEM – tennis
- Klub Sportowy Zakład Karny – volleyball
- Bialski Klub Karate Kyokushin
- Klub Sportowy Wushu
- WOPR Biała Podlaska
- Automobilklub bialskopodlaski
- Bialski Klub Rowerowy – cycling
- Bialskie Stowarzyszenie Koszykówki "KADET" - basketball

== Twin towns and sister cities ==
Biała Podlaska is twinned with:

- Niort in France

Former twin towns:

- Brest in Belarus

In March 2022, Biała Podlaska suspended its partnership with the Belarusian city of Brest as a reaction to the Belarusian involvement in the 2022 Russian invasion of Ukraine.

== Notable people ==
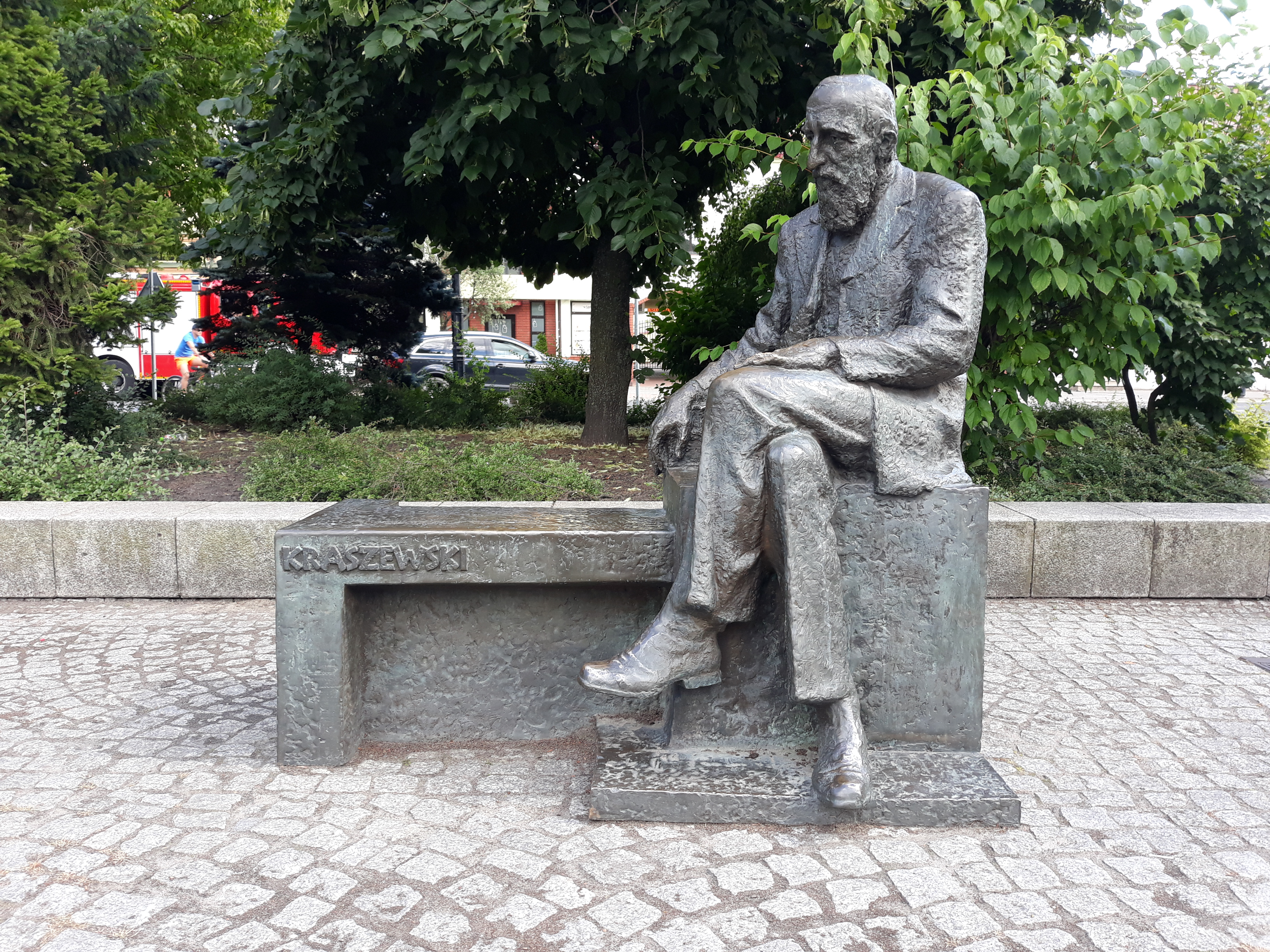
Józef Ignacy Kraszewski Bench

- Karol Stanisław "Panie Kochanku" Radziwiłł (1734–1790), Polish noble and aristocrat, died in Biała
- George Bridgetower (1778–1860), Polish/English violinist of African descent, famous for giving the premiere of Beethoven's Kreutzer Sonata
- Józef Ignacy Kraszewski (1812–1887), Polish writer, author of about 200 novels, received his primary education at the local academy, the Biała's college in 1822–1826
- Julian Bartoszewicz (1821–1870), Polish historian
- Apolinary Hartglas (1883–1953), lawyer, publicist, Jewish politician, a parliament deputy from 1919 to 1930
- Xenia Denikina (1892–1973), wife of Anton Denikin, kept a journal of émigré life in France during WWII
- Benedykt Kraskowski (1904–44), "Righteous Among the Nations"
- Sebastian Szymański (born 1999), Polish footballer
- Piotr Tarkowski (born 1999), Polish long jumper

== Bibliography ==
- Borek, Paweł (2004). "Obóz jeńców włoskich w Białej Podlaskiej wrzesień 1943 – czerwiec 1944". Podlaski Kwartalnik Kulturalny (in Polish). No. 2. Biała Podlaska. ISSN 1234-6160.
