= Ratajewicze =

- Village
- Location within Poland
- Coordinates: 51°43′N 23°19′E
- Country: Poland
- Voivodeship: Lublin
- County: Biała
- Gmina: Wisznice
- Time zone: UTC+1 (CET)
  - Summer (DST): UTC+2 (CEST)

Ratajewicze [ratajɛˈvʲit͡ʂɛ] is a village in the administrative district of Gmina Wisznice, within Biała County, Lublin Voivodeship, in eastern Poland.

== History ==
11 Polish citizens were murdered by Nazi Germany in the village during World War II.
