= Kolonia Wisznice =

- Village
- Location within Poland
- Coordinates: 51°48′2″N 23°14′3″E
- Country: Poland
- Voivodeship: Lublin
- County: Biała
- Gmina: Wisznice

Population
  - Total: 270

Kolonia Wisznice [kɔˈlɔɲa vʲiʂˈɲit͡sɛ] is a village in the administrative district of Gmina Wisznice, within Biała County, Lublin Voivodeship, in eastern Poland.
