= Polubicze Wiejskie =

- Village
- Location within Poland
- Coordinates: 51°47′N 23°5′E
- Country: Poland
- Voivodeship: Lublin
- County: Biała
- Gmina: Wisznice

Polubicze Wiejskie [pɔluˈbʲit͡ʂɛ ˈvʲɛi̯skʲɛ] is a village in the administrative district of Gmina Wisznice, within Biała County, Lublin Voivodeship, in eastern Poland.
