= Ballyduff, County Wexford =

Village in County Wexford, Ireland

Coordinates: 52.637°N 6.469°W

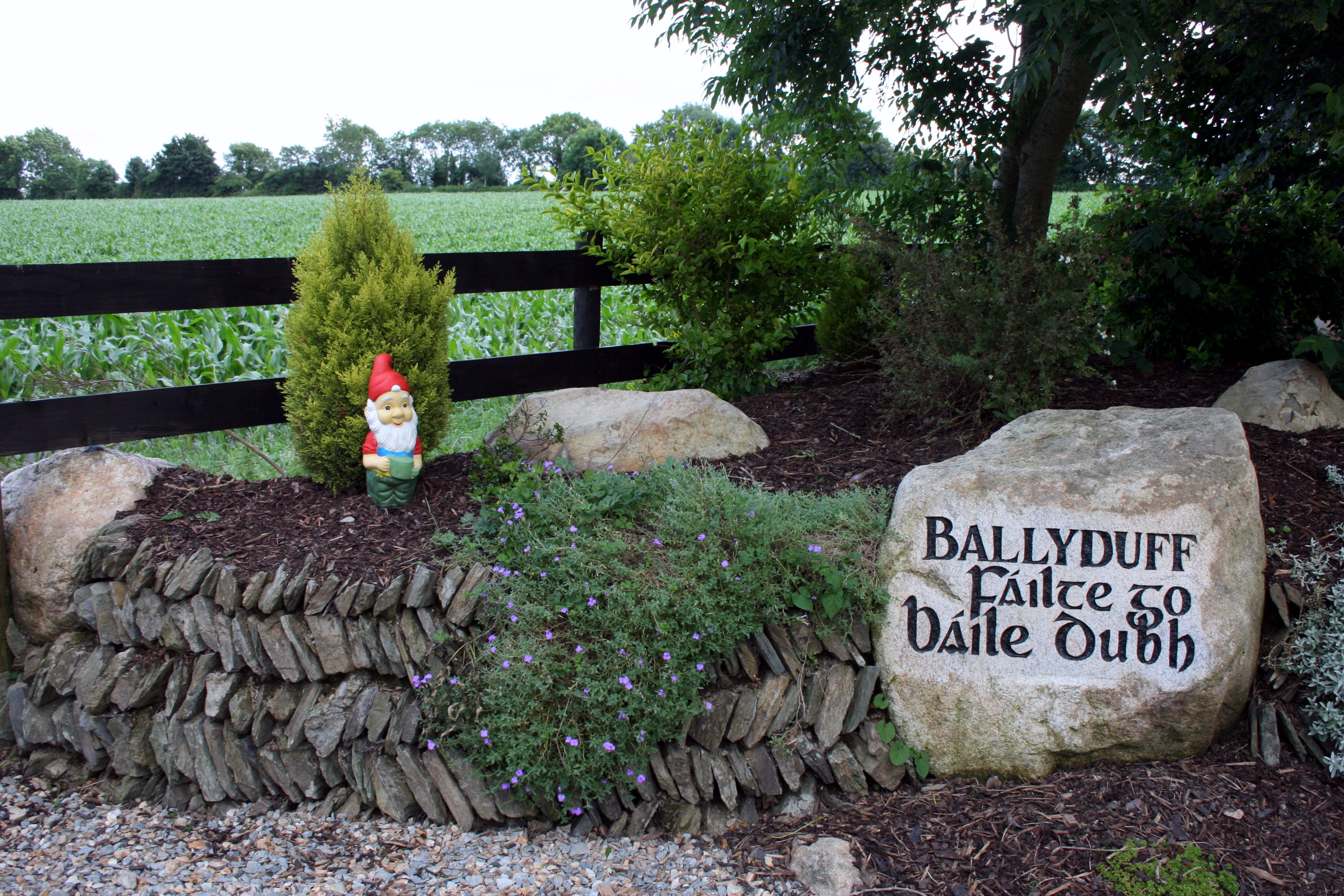
Welcome sign in Ballyduff

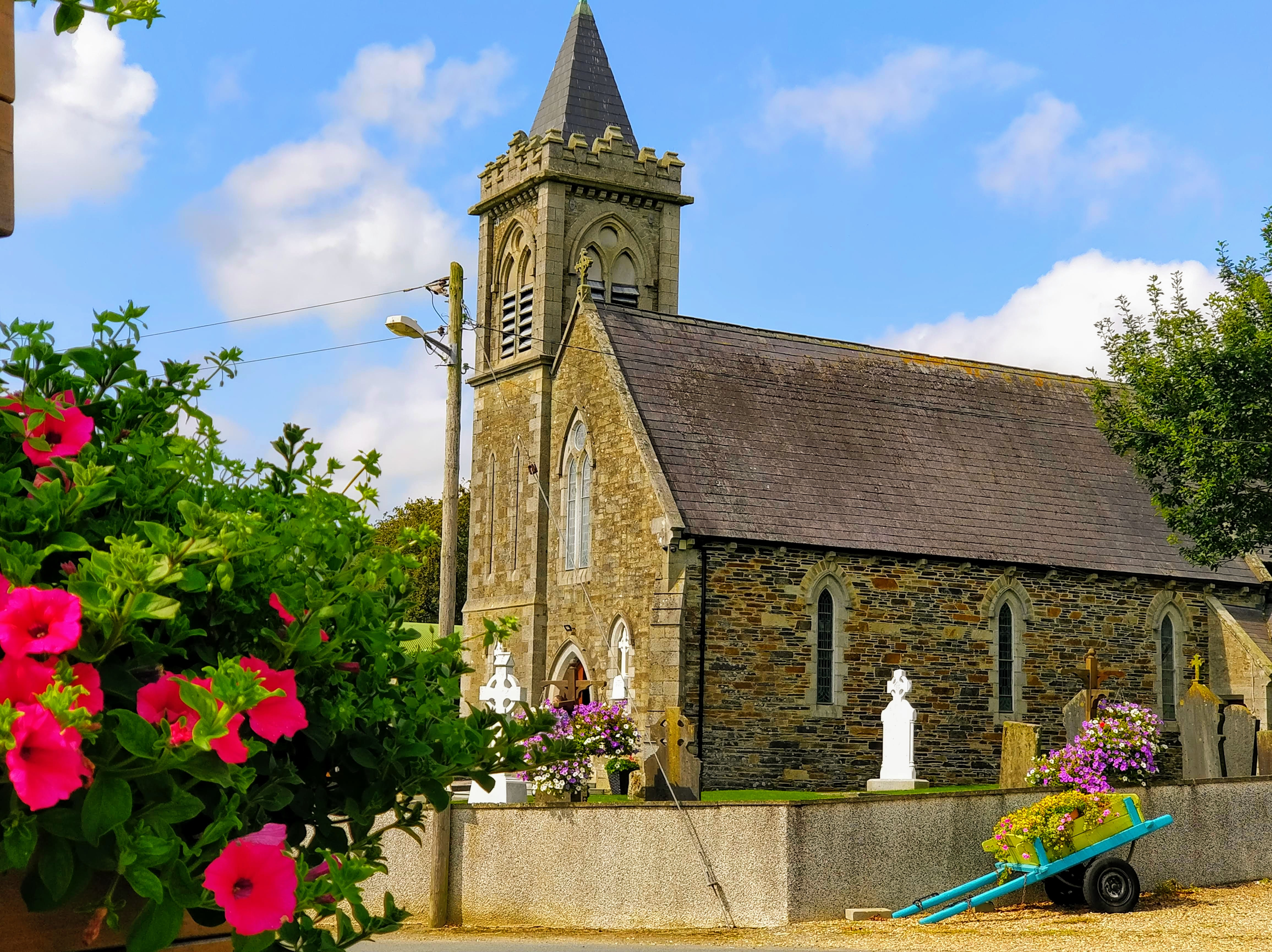
Catholic church in Ballyduff

Ballyduff (Irish: Baile Dubh, meaning 'black town or townland') is a townland and small rural village in County Wexford in southeastern Ireland. It is situated in the civil parish of Kilcomb approximately 5 km (3 mi) north of the town Ferns, and northwest of the village of Camolin. The townland of Ballyduff, which is 2.57 km^{2} (0.99 sq mi) in area, had a population of 67 people as of the 2011 census.

== Amenities ==
The local national (primary) school is Ballyduff National School. As of 2024, it had an enrollment of 64 pupils.

Other amenities include St Columba's Catholic church (built in 1872 to replace an earlier church), a small park (opened in 2007), and two small village shops. There are several hiking trails in the nearby Slieveboy (Sliabh Buí) mountains.

Ballyduff won a "best new entry" award at the Tidy Towns competition in 2005.

== See also ==
- List of towns and villages in Ireland
