= Biała Podlaska Airport =

Former military airfield in Poland

Biała Podlaska Airport Port Lotniczy Biała Podlaska
- IATA: BXP; ICAO: EPBP

Summary
- Airport type: Public
- Operator: Cargo Hub Warszawa Biała
- Serves: Biała Podlaska, Poland
- Closed: 2020
- Coordinates: 52°00′11″N 23°08′37″E

Map
- Location of airport in Poland

Runways
Direction	Length		Surface
Direction	m	ft	Surface
0	3,300	0	Concrete

Statistics (2007 +/- change from 2006)
- Passengers: 0
- Cargo (in tons): 0
- Takeoffs/Landings: 0
- Source: Polish AIP at EUROCONTROL

Biała Podlaska Airport, formerly IATA: BXP, ICAO: EPBP, is a closed military airport, located in the city of Biała Podlaska, in the north of Lublin Voivodship.

== History ==
The airfield in Biała Podlaska was established in 1923 to serve the PWS aircraft factory. Between 1945 and 2002 it was an active military air base of the Polish Air Force.

Since the 1990s there were plans to modernize it so it could serve as a cargo airport, as well as a passenger airport in the more distant future. A company was established to carry out the work. However, in the end the plans did not succeed.

In 2020 the Polish Army took over the airfield to use its land for a new military base for Poland's land forces, bringing all aircraft operations to an end.

== Airport infrastructure ==
The post-military airport ranked in top five airports in Poland in terms of its infrastructure length.

There exists a railroad spur next to the terminal that could have been used for passenger service.
