= Wisznice =

- Village
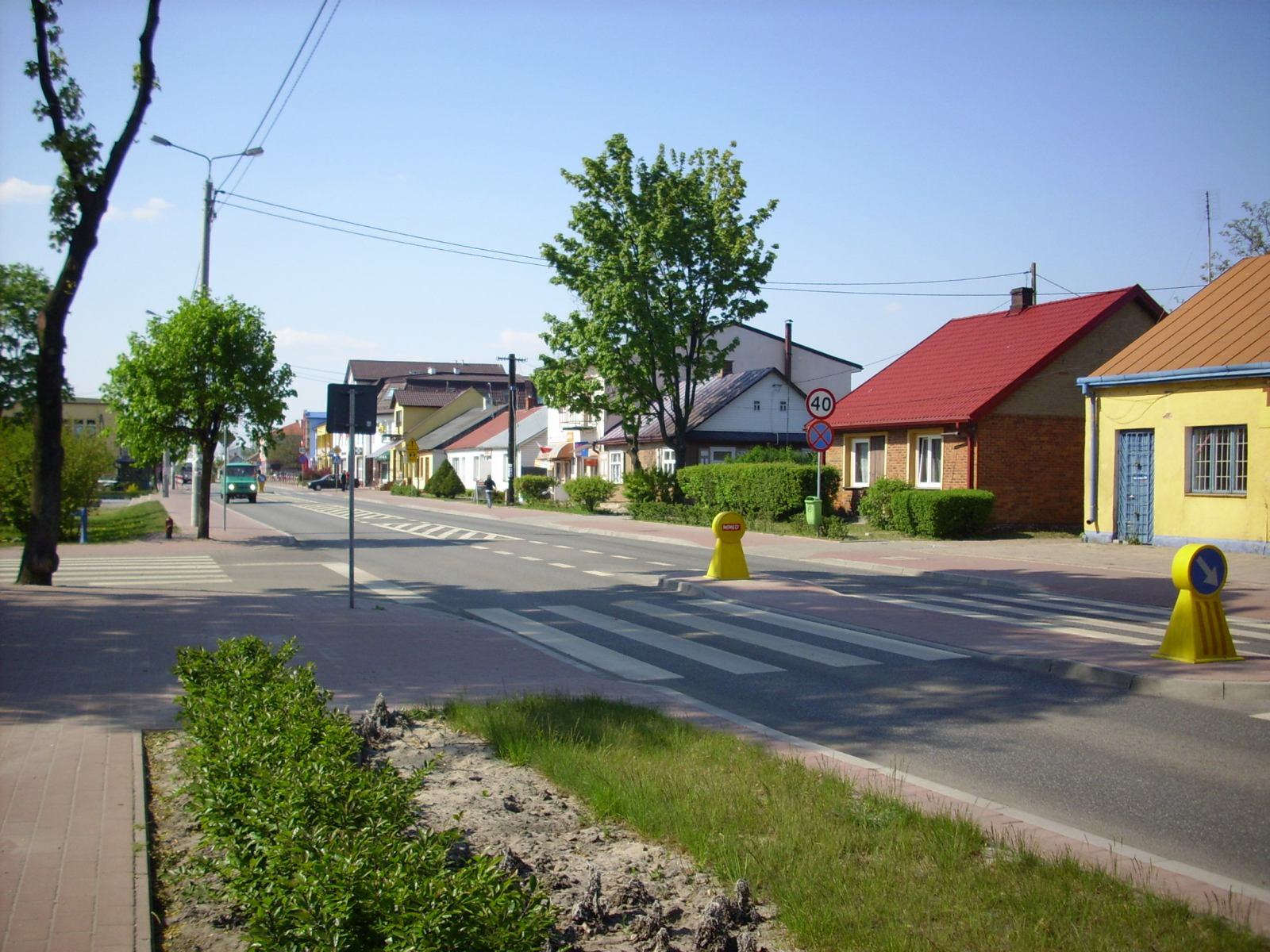

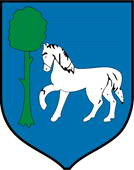
- Coat of arms

- Location within Poland
- Coordinates: 51°47′24″N 23°12′32″E
- Country: Poland
- Voivodeship: Lublin
- County: Biała
- Gmina: Wisznice
- Highest elevation: 168.0 m (551.2 ft)
- Lowest elevation: 149.0 m (488.8 ft)

Population
  - Total: 1,559
- Website: http://www.wisznice.pl

Wisznice [vʲiʂˈɲit͡sɛ] is a village in Biała County, Lublin Voivodeship, in eastern Poland. It is the seat of the gmina (administrative district) called Gmina Wisznice.
