= Marylin, Lublin Voivodeship =

Marylin
- Village
- Location within Poland
- Coordinates: 51°43′55″N 23°14′55″E
- Country: Poland
- Voivodeship: Lublin
- County: Biała
- Gmina: Wisznice

Population
  - Total: 120

Marylin [maˈrɨlʲin] is a village in the administrative district of Gmina Wisznice, within Biała County, Lublin Voivodeship, in eastern Poland.
