= PWS-103 =

General information
- Type: High performance sailplane
- National origin: Poland
- Manufacturer: PWS
- Designer: Wacław Czerwiński and Józef Niespał
- Number built: 2

History
- First flight: August 1939 or spring 1940
- Developed from: PWS-102

The PWS-103 was a high performance, Polish 15 m (49 ft 3 in) span sailplane developed from the longer-span PWS-102 just before World War II.

== Design and development ==
The PWS-103 was the third and last glider built by PWS, based in Biała Podlaska. Like the first two it was designed by the experienced Wacław Czerwiński, with the assistance of Józef Niespał who had also collaborated on the PWS-102. It was a high performance, gull wing, wooden, single-seat sailplane, which incorporated much learned from the PWS-101 and particularly from the PWS-102, but had a smaller span (15.0 m (49 ft 3 in)) than the earlier, 19.0 m (62 ft 4 in) designs.

The gull wing of the PWS-103 was high-mounted and had only moderate central dihedral. In plan it was straight-tapered out to long, elliptical tips. It was built around a forward main spar and a rear auxiliary spar, joined by two-ply sheet to form a box-spar. Each wing had split, differential, fabric-covered ailerons mounted on the auxiliary spar. Underwing IAW airbrakes replaced the camber-changing inboard flaps and DFS airbrakes of the PWS-102.

The plywood semi-monocoque, oval section fuselage of the PWS-103 was very similar to that of the PWS-102 though slightly shorter. The cockpit glazing extended smoothly rearwards from the nose to the wing leading edge. Behind the wing the fuselage tapered to an integral, ply-covered, curved fin with a broad, fabric-covered rudder. The elliptical plan horizontal tail, with its ply-covered tailplane and fabric-covered split elevators, was mounted on top of the fuselage. Landing gear was the usual under-fuselage skid and tailskid.

== Operational history ==
Sources differ over the date of the first flight of the PWS-103. According to Cynk, this took place in August 1939, piloted by Zbigniew Żabski. Samolotypolskie cites a later work by Glass as saying neither of two prototypes was finished before the Soviet invasion of northern Poland late in September 1939. In this account they were completed in Poland over the winter then in early 1940 moved to Moscow where they were highly rated by the Soviet pilots who tested them. At least one PWS-103 competed in the 15th All-Polish Gliding Competition held near Moscow later in 1940.

== Specifications ==
Data from samolotypolskie,

General characteristics

- Crew: One
- Length: 6.7 m (22 ft 0 in)
- Wingspan: 15.0 m (49 ft 3 in)
- Height: 1.6 m (5 ft 3 in)
- Wing area: 14.0 m^{2} (151 sq ft)
- Aspect ratio: 16
- Empty weight: 180 kg (397 lb)
- Gross weight: 275 kg (606 lb)

Performance

- Never exceed speed: 300 km/h (190 mph, 160 kn) diving
- Maximum glide ratio: 27 at 80 km/h (50 mph; 43 kn)
- Rate of sink: 0.7 m/s (140 ft/min) minimum, at 65 km/h (40 mph; 35 kn)
- Minimum speed: 55 km/h (34 mph; 30 kn)
