= PWS-15 =

Polish biplane fighter aircraft (1930s)

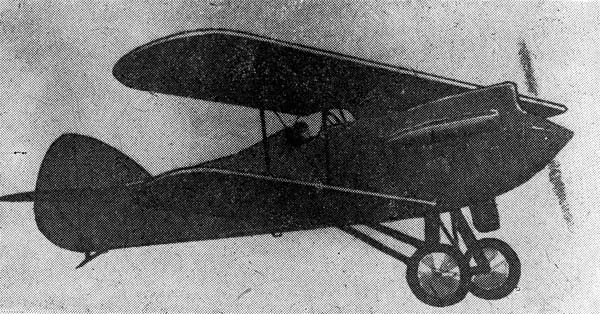
- Profile of the PWS-15 fighter

General information
- Type: Fighter aircraft
- National origin: Second Polish Republic
- Manufacturer: Podlaska Wytwórnia Samolotów
- Designer: Aleksander Grzędzielski; August Bobek-Zdaniewski
- Number built: 1

History
- First flight: December 1930

The PWS-15 was a Polish single-seat fighter aircraft designed as a biplane in the 1930s by engineers Aleksander Grzędzielski and August Bobek-Zdaniewski. Constructed at the Podlaska Wytwórnia Samolotów in Biała Podlaska, it was test-flown in December 1930. The PWS-15 served as a comparative study to the concurrently developed monoplane PWS-10. Despite superior flight characteristics, the PWS-15 was not selected for serial production. Instead, the PWS-10 was chosen, and the factory management ordered the disassembly of the PWS-15 prototype and suppression of information regarding its existence and performance.

== History ==
Lorraine-Dietrich 12 Eb engine on display at the Polish Aviation Museum in Kraków

In 1928, engineers Aleksander Grzędzielski and August Bobek-Zdaniewski at the Podlaska Wytwórnia Samolotów designed the high-wing fighter PWS-10. The prototype, a competitor to Zygmunt Puławski's PZL P.1, was test-flown in March 1930. After successful trials at the Institute of Aviation Technology in mid-1930, the Polish military ordered 50 units, with an additional 30 ordered in 1931, for serial production. During preparations for PWS-10 production, the designers initiated a comparative project, creating a biplane variant designated PWS-15. In 1930, they developed documentation for a pair of biplane wings, which were fitted to one of the two PWS-10 prototypes. The aircraft was test-flown in December 1930 by factory pilot Franciszek Rutkowski. The test pilot reported that the PWS-15 outperformed the PWS-10 in rate of climb, maneuverability, and handling, though it had a slightly lower maximum speed.

Due to the advanced stage of PWS-10 production preparations and potential organizational complications, the factory management ordered the PWS-15's disassembly in February 1931 and concealed all details of its development. The aircraft's existence was only confirmed in 1971 by one of its designers, August Bobek-Zdaniewski, over 40 years later.

== Design and technical specifications ==
The PWS-15 was a single-engine, single-seat biplane fighter with a mixed construction. The fuselage consisted of a truss framework of welded steel tubes, reinforced with wire bracing, featuring an oval cross-section. It was covered with duralumin sheeting at the front and canvas elsewhere. The open cockpit was equipped with a windshield and a seat designed for a back-mounted parachute. The instrument panel included a compass, airspeed indicator, altimeter, turn and slip indicator, tachometer, water and engine oil temperature gauges, and a fuel level indicator. The engine throttle was mounted on the left side of the cockpit, while controls for emergency fuel tank jettison and radiator shutter adjustment were on the right.

The wings were rectangular with rounded tips, featuring a two-spar wooden structure. The leading edges were covered with plywood, and the rest with canvas. The single-bay wing structure was connected by inverted "N" struts and reinforced with profiled steel wire bracing. The wings had a thin (10%) airfoil profile, uniform except at the tips. The wingspan was 10 metres, with a wing area of 23 m², distributed 56% to the upper wing and 44% to the lower. Ailerons, with a total area of 2.4 m² (59% upper, 41% lower), were fitted on both wings. The wing loading was 65.8 kg/m².

The aircraft was 7.5 metres long and 3 metres high. Its empty weight was 1,145 kg, useful load 370 kg, and gross weight 1,515 kg. The flight control surfaces were conventional, with steel tube framework covered in canvas. The vertical stabilizer was adjustable, and the horizontal stabilizers were supported by single struts and wire bracing. The landing gear was a conventional two-leg design with a split axle and Vickers hydraulic shock absorbers, complemented by a rear steel leaf spring tailskid.

The aircraft was powered by a liquid-cooled, 12-cylinder V engine in a W engine configuration, the Lorraine-Dietrich 12 Eb, delivering 336 kW (450 hp) at 1,850 RPM, with a takeoff power of 478 hp and a weight of 400 kg. It drove a fixed, two-blade wooden propeller by Szomański, with a diameter of 2.89 metres. The power loading was 3.36 kg/hp. The jettisonable fuel tank held 280 litres, and the oil tank 30 litres. The maximum speed was 237 km/h, cruise speed 210 km/h, and stall speed 88 km/h. Fuel consumption was 100 litres per hour. The aircraft achieved a service ceiling of 6,000 metres with a rate of climb of 12 m/s at ground level. The takeoff distance was 80 metres, and the landing distance 70 metres. The range was 410 km. The minimum turning radius was 65 metres.

The armament consisted of two 7.92 mm Vickers machine guns with 500 rounds per gun, synchronized using a Colbert synchronizer and aimed with a Chretién reflector sight. The aircraft was also equipped with a K-28 gun cameras and a Perkun flare gun with 10 rounds.

=== Livery ===
The PWS-15 prototype was painted olive green.

== Bibliography ==
- Glass, Andrzej (2004). Polskie konstrukcje lotnicze do 1939 r [Polish Aircraft Designs Until 1939] (in Polish). Vol. 1. Sandomierz: Stratus. ISBN 83-916327-8-4.
- Morgała, Andrzej (1972). Polskie samoloty wojskowe 1918–1939 [Polish Military Aircraft 1918–1939] (in Polish). Warsaw: Wydawnictwo Ministerstwa Obrony Narodowej.
- Morgała, Andrzej (2003). Samoloty wojskowe w Polsce 1924–1939 [Military Aircraft in Poland 1924–1939] (in Polish). Warsaw: Bellona. ISBN 83-11-09319-9.
