= PWS-52 =

1930s Polish light aircraft

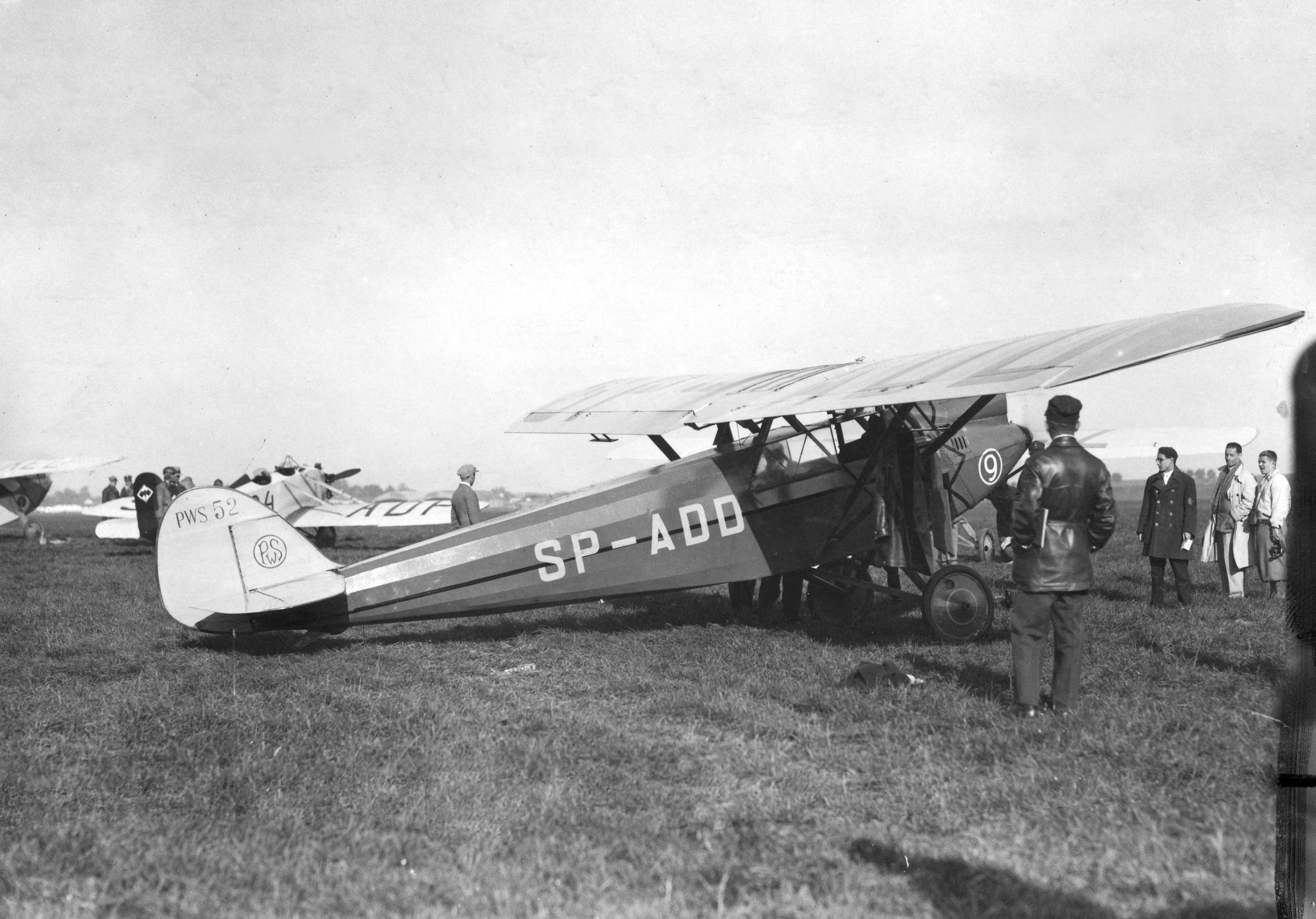

General information
- Type: Sports aircraft
- Manufacturer: PWS
- Status: prototype
- Number built: 1

History
- First flight: July 1930
- Retired: 1939

The PWS-52 was a Polish sports aircraft of 1930, a single-engine high-wing monoplane, constructed by the Podlaska Wytwórnia Samolotów (PWS), that remained a prototype.

== Development ==
The aircraft was designed in 1929 by Zbysław Ciołkosz and Antoni Uszacki in the Podlaska Wytwórnia Samolotów, specifically to participate in the Challenge international touring aircraft contest (along with PWS-50, PWS-51 and PWS-8). The design was generally modelled after de Havilland Puss Moth. The aircraft was first flown in early July 1930 by Franciszek Rutkowski in Biała Podlaska, weeks before the contest.

== Operational history ==
The prototype, with markings SP-ADD and contest number O8, took part in the Challenge International de Tourisme 1930 contest in 20–31 July 1930, flown by Franciszek Rutkowski. Unfortunately, after landing in Saint-Inglevert, the aircraft was overturned by the wind and was damaged.

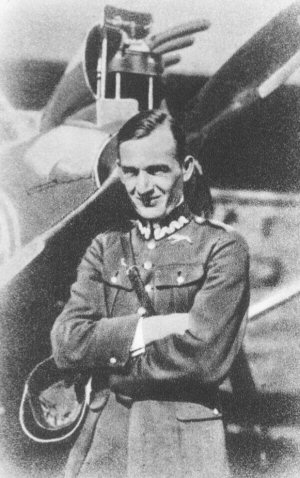
Józef Lewoniewski by the PWS-52 (initial engine)

After repairs the rudder shape was changed. Later the aircraft took part in some competitions in Poland, with limited success. Among others, flown by Józef Lewoniewski it took the 4th place in the 3rd Polish Light Aircraft Contest in September–October 1930. Lewoniewski then came up with an idea of solo flying the PWS-52 around the world. In 1931 the aircraft was fitted with three extra fuel tanks, giving a maximum capacity 760 L of fuel, which resulted in a range of 4000 km. The aircraft was fitted with a radio and a place for a dinghy. The rudder shape changed again, and the engine DH Gipsy I (85 HP) was changed to DH Gipsy III (120 hp), altering the aircraft's nose. Its maximum take-off weight rose to 1160 kg (with empty weight of 480 kg).

The modified aircraft was ready in April 1931, and Lewoniewski flew it around Poland on 15 August 1931, on a distance of 1755 km without landing, with one passenger. On 1 September 1931 Lewoniewski flew the aircraft from Warsaw to Saloniki and back (2700 km). On the way, he had to land in Hungary and Greece due to engine faults. Lack of funds and problems of the PWS factory caused the plan to fly around the world to be abandoned.

In 1937 the aircraft was bought by a private owner from the PWS Aviation Club, who dismounted the extra tanks and used it in a sports aviation. The plane crashed in 1939 during a training flight.

== Description ==
The PWS-52 was single-engine mixed construction braced high-wing monoplane. A fuselage was built on a steel frame, covered with canvas and aluminium in engine part. Rectangular three-section wings with rounded tips, two-spar, were covered with plywood in forward part and canvas in a rear part. A central part of wings was some distance above the canopy, supported with struts. Side sections of wings were supported with V struts and folds rearwards. The aircraft can seat two, sitting side by side in a covered cockpit. A luggage compartment was behind a cockpit, that could fitted with a 3rd seat. The PWS-52 had a fixed conventional landing gear, with a rear skid.

The aircraft used 4-cylinder air-cooled straight engine de Havilland Gipsy I in front, 85/95 hp nominal/take-off power, later replaced with de Havilland Gipsy III, 120 hp, with two-blade wooden propeller of a fixed pitch. Fuel tank (170 L capacity) is placed in a central wing section (normal amount of fuel - 90 L). Fuel consumption rate is 25 L/hour (Gipsy I) or 28 L/hour (Gipsy III).

== Specifications ==
Data from Polskie konstrukcje lotnicze 1893–1939

General characteristics

- Crew: 1
- Capacity: 2
- Length: 7.53 m (24 ft 8 in)
- Wingspan: 11.52 m (37 ft 10 in)
- Height: 2.39 m (7 ft 10 in)
- Wing area: 19.5 m^{2} (210 sq ft)
- Empty weight: 439 kg (968 lb)
- Gross weight: 655 kg (1,444 lb)
- Max takeoff weight: 828 kg (1,825 lb)
- Fuel capacity: 170 L (45 US gal; 37 imp gal) in a centre-section tank
- Powerplant: 1 × de Havilland Gipsy I 4-cylinder inverted air-cooled in-line piston engine, 71 kW (95 hp) for take-off

85 hp (63 kW) nominal power

- Propellers: 2-bladed fixed-pitch propeller

Performance

- Maximum speed: 170 km/h (110 mph, 92 kn)
- Cruise speed: 140 km/h (87 mph, 76 kn)
- Range: 480–760 km (300–470 mi, 260–410 nmi)
- Service ceiling: 3,200 m (10,500 ft)
- Rate of climb: 2.6 m/s (510 ft/min)
- Wing loading: 33.5 kg/m^{2} (6.9 lb/sq ft)
- Fuel consumption: 25 L/h (6.60 gal/h; 5.50 imp gal/h) (Gipsy I) or 28 L/h (7.40 gal/h; 6.16 imp gal/h) (Gipsy III)

== See also ==
Aircraft of comparable role, configuration, and era

- de Havilland Puss Moth
