= PWS-8 =

1930s Polish light aircraft

P.W.S.8
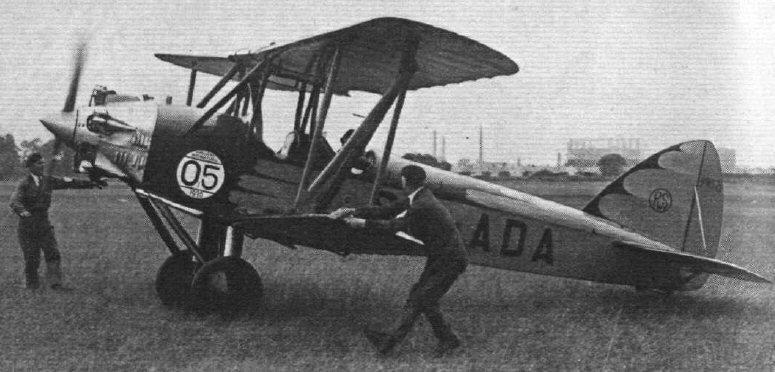
- PWS-8 during the Challenge contest

General information
- Type: Sports plane
- Manufacturer: PWS
- Status: prototype
- Number built: 1

History
- Introduction date: 1930
- First flight: 1929 or 1930

The P.W.S.8 was a 1930 Polish sports plane, constructed by the Podlaska Wytwórnia Samolotów (PWS), that remained a prototype.

== Design and development ==
The plane was designed in 1929 by Jarosław Naleszkiewicz in Podlaska Wytwórnia Samolotów, on factory's initiative, to participate in the Challenge 1930 international touring aircraft contest (with P.W.S.50, P.W.S.51 and P.W.S.52). It was a wooden biplane, partly modelled after de Havilland Gipsy Moth. Its unique feature, taken from earlier PWS military aircraft, like P.W.S.5, were N-shaped struts between lower and upper wing and additional oblique transverse struts, stiffening the design, instead of wire braces (similar bracing to Handley Page Gugnunc).

The plane was first flown in 1929 or 1930 by F. Rutkowski, with Armstrong Siddeley Genet 80 hp radial engine. In spring of 1930 it was modified, with Walter Vega 85 hp radial engine, also a tailfin shape and some other details were changed. It was however too heavy for engines used (65 kg heavier, than designed).

The plane was a counterpart of PZL.5 for a sportsplane and trainer, but was worse, and as a result, remained a prototype. Its major fault was low speed, especially in a view of competition purpose.

== Operational history ==
The prototype, with markings SP-ADA, took part in the Challenge 1930 international contest in July 1930, flown by Piotr Dudziński. He was disqualified for time infringement during a rally over Europe, but completed the rally off the contest.

Later the plane was used for a short time by an Aviation Club of the PWS factory. Possibly it was broken up by 1931, because there is information about its engine being used in the repaired P.W.S.51.

== Description ==
The P.W.S.8 was a wooden construction braced biplane. A fuselage was rectangular in cross-section, with plywood skin, except for an engine section, which was duralumin sheet covered. The wings were rectangular three-section, two-spar, with rounded tips, canvas covered (plywood covered on a leading edge). The ailerons were on a lower wing, which had a smaller span of 9 m. The wings were folding rearwards (width with folded wings was 2.95 m). Crew of two, sitting in tandem in open cockpits with windshields. Cockpits with dual controls (a front cockpit had removable steering stick). The third cab could be set up in a baggage compartment behind.

The plane had 5-cylinder air-cooled radial engine Walter Vega in front, developing 85 hp nominal power and 90 hp take-off power. Two-blade wooden propeller Heine of a fixed pitch. Conventional fixed landing gear, with a rear skid. Fuel tank 125 L in upper central wing section (additional 60 L tank could be mounted in the fuselage front). Fuel consumption - 22 L/hour.

== Specifications (P.W.S.8) ==
Data from

General characteristics

- Crew: 2
- Length: 7.5 m (24 ft 7 in)
- Wingspan: 10 m (32 ft 10 in)
- Height: 2.95 m (9 ft 8 in)
- Wing area: 22.1 m^{2} (238 sq ft)
- Empty weight: 455 kg (1,003 lb)
- Gross weight: 775 kg (1,709 lb)
- Powerplant: 1 × Walter Vega 5-cylinder air-cooled radial piston engine, 63 kW (85 hp)
- Propellers: 2-bladed fixed-pitch propeller

Performance

- Maximum speed: 136 km/h (85 mph, 73 kn)
- Cruise speed: 125 km/h (78 mph, 67 kn)
- Stall speed: 72 km/h (45 mph, 39 kn)
- Range: 700 km (430 mi, 380 nmi)
- Service ceiling: 3,000 m (9,800 ft)
- Rate of climb: 2.4 m/s (470 ft/min)
- Wing loading: 35 kg/m^{2} (7.2 lb/sq ft)

== See also ==
Aircraft of comparable role, configuration, and era

- Albatros L 82
- Avro Avian
- de Havilland Gipsy Moth
- Handley Page Gugnunc
- Simmonds Spartan
