= PWS-4 =

1920s Polish light aircraft

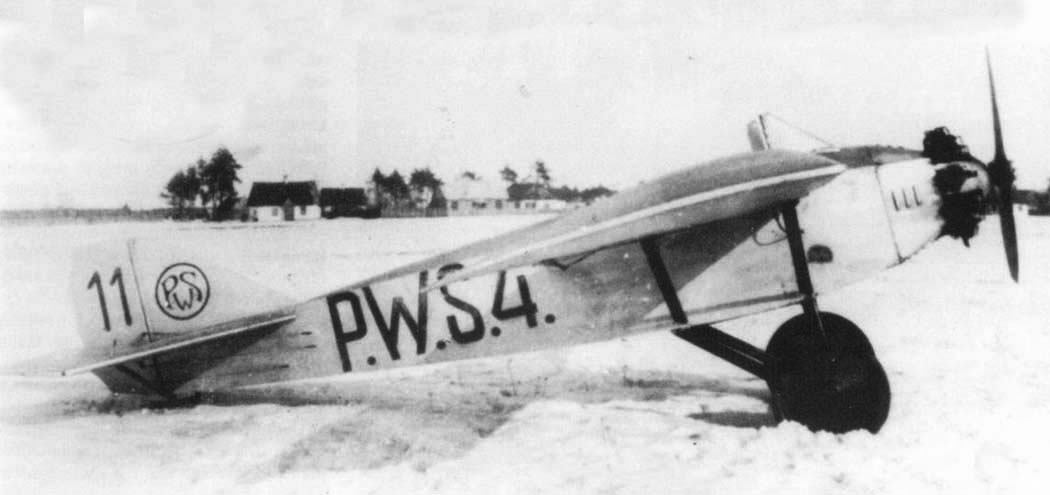
- PWS-4 in 1928

General information
- Type: Sports aircraft
- Manufacturer: Podlaska Wytwórnia Samolotów (PWS)
- Status: prototype
- Number built: 1

History
- First flight: September 1928

The PWS-4 (PWS - Podlaska Wytwórnia Samolotów - Podlasie Aircraft Factory) was a prototype Polish sports aircraft, developed in 1928 by Podlaska Wytwórnia Samolotów.

== Design and development ==
The PWS-4 was conceived as a cheap and simple single seater sports aircraft. It was designed by August Bobek-Zdaniewski in the Podlaska Wytwórnia Samolotów factory in 1928. The prototype was flown in September 1928 at Biała Podlaska, by Franciszek Rutkowski. It did not enter production due to lack of orders, as the Polish sports aviation movement was interested mostly in more universal two-seater machines. The design was later used as the basis for the PWS-50.

== Operational history ==
The prototype PWS-4 took part in the second Polish Light Aircraft Contest between 29 October-1 November 1928, taking sixth place. Later it was used by the LOPP paramilitary organization in Biała Podlaska. Among others, it was used for aerobatics.

== Construction ==
The PWS-4 was a single-seater high-wing braced monoplane of wooden construction. The fuselage was a wooden frame, covered with plywood, apart from the engine section, which was covered with aluminium sheeting. The empennage structure was wood, with fabric covering. The rectangular wooden wings had two spars; were covered with plywood in front and fabric in the rear; and were supported with pairs of twin struts. The undercarriage consisted of a fixed common axle conventional landing gear, with a rear skid. Fuel was carried in a tank in the wings, 45 L capacity.

The 9-cylinder Salmson AD.9 air-cooled radial engine was rated at 40 hp (30 kW), driving a two-blade fixed pitch wooden propeller. Cruise fuel consumption was 11-13 L/h.

== Specification (PWS-4) ==
Data from Polskie konstrukcje lotnicze 1893–1939, Polish aircraft 1893-1939

General characteristics

- Crew: 1
- Length: 5.57 m (18 ft 3 in)
- Wingspan: 7.6 m (24 ft 11 in)
- Height: 1.8 m (5 ft 11 in)
- Wing area: 11 m^{2} (120 sq ft)
- Airfoil: Bobek-Zdaniewski No.6 (Göttingen 655)
- Empty weight: 238 kg (525 lb)
- Gross weight: 350 kg (772 lb)
- Powerplant: 1 × Salmson AD.9 9-cylinder air-cooled radial piston engine, 30 kW (40 hp)
- Propellers: 2-bladed fixed-pitch propeller

Performance

- Maximum speed: 140 km/h (87 mph, 76 kn) at sea level
- Cruise speed: 123 km/h (76 mph, 66 kn)
- Minimum speed: 60 km/h (37 mph; 32 kn)
- Range: 400 km (250 mi, 220 nmi)
- Service ceiling: 3,500 m (11,500 ft)
- Rate of climb: 1.4 m/s (280 ft/min)
- Wing loading: 31.8 kg/m^{2} (6.5 lb/sq ft)
- Power/mass: 0.085 kW/kg (0.052 hp/lb)
