= PWS-51 =

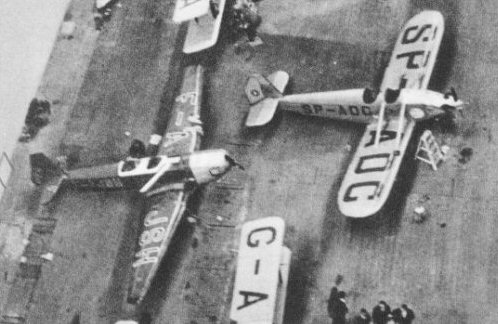
- PWS-51 (SP-ADC, on the right) during the Challenge 1930

General information
- Type: Sports plane
- Manufacturer: PWS
- Status: prototype
- Number built: 1

History
- First flight: 1930
- Retired: 1934

The PWS-51 was a Polish sports plane of 1930, a single-engine low-wing monoplane, constructed by the Podlaska Wytwórnia Samolotów (PWS), that remained a prototype.

== Design and development ==
The plane was designed in 1929 by Stanisław Cywiński in Podlaska Wytwórnia Samolotów, on factory's initiative, specially to participate in the Challenge 1930 international touring aircraft contest (along with PWS-50, PWS-52 and PWS-8). The plane was built with a financial help of LOPP organization and it was first flown in spring of 1930 by Franciszek Rutkowski in Biała Podlaska. It's noteworthy, that it was only 10 kg heavier, and its maximum speed was 15 km/h higher, than estimated.

== Operational history ==
The prototype, with markings SP-ADC and contest number O7, took part in the Challenge 1930 international contest in July 1930, flown by Józef Lewoniewski. He completed most of a rally over Europe, but had to withdraw after a forced landing near Vienna on July 28, due to an oil pipe damage.

Later the plane took part in some competitions in Poland, without much success, among others it took the 10th place in the 3rd Polish Light Aircraft Contest in 1930. In 1931 during repair, a radial engine Genet was replaced with a radial engine Walter Vega NZ (from PWS-8 aircraft) with a Townend ring. It was used then by an Aviation Club of the PWS factory. In June 1933 the plane was damaged. During repair it was fitted with a straight engine Cirrus III (from broken up PWS-50 aircraft).

It crashed during the 4th Winter Air Contest of Lublin and Podlasie in 2–4 February 1934, flown by A. Uszacki, and was broken up.

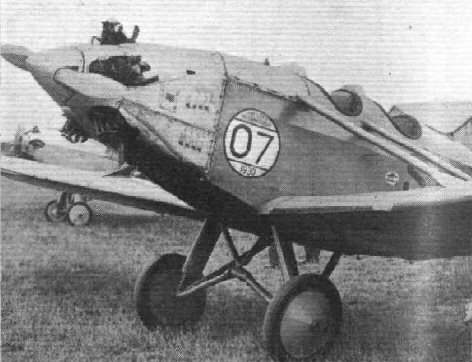
PWS-51 during the Challenge 1930

== Description ==
Single-engine mixed construction braced low-wing monoplane. Fuselage rectangular in cross-section, built on a steel frame, covered with canvas and aluminum in engine part. Rectangular two-section wings with rounded tips, two-spar, covered with plywood in forward part and canvas in a rear part, supported with upper struts. Crew of two, sitting in tandem in open cockpits with windshields, fitted with dual controls. A luggage compartment behind a cockpit. Conventional fixed landing gear, with a rear skid.

5-cylinder air-cooled radial engine Armstrong Siddeley Genet in front, 80 hp nominal power and 88 hp take-off power (later replaced with Walter Vega NZ 5-cylinder radial engine, 85 HP nominal power, and Cirrus III 4-cylinder straight engine, 85 HP nominal and 94 take-off power). Two-blade wooden propeller of a fixed pitch. Fuel tank 100 L before a cockpit. Fuel consumption - 22 L/hour.

== Specifications ==
Data from Jane's all the World's Aircraft 1931, Poser - PWS - Podlaska Wytwórnia Samolotów : PWS-51

General characteristics

- Crew: 2
- Length: 7.7 m (25 ft 3 in)
- Wingspan: 10.8 m (35 ft 5 in)
- Height: 2.2 m (7 ft 3 in)
- Wing area: 18 m^{2} (190 sq ft)
- Empty weight: 440 kg (970 lb)
- Gross weight: 720 kg (1,587 lb)
- Powerplant: 1 × Armstrong Siddeley Genet 5-cylinder air-cooled radial piston engine, 60 kW (80 hp) to 66 kW (88 hp)
- Propellers: 2-bladed fixed-pitch propeller

Performance

- Maximum speed: 155 km/h (96 mph, 84 kn)
- Cruise speed: 120 km/h (75 mph, 65 kn) to 140 km/h (87 mph; 76 kn)
- Stall speed: 70 km/h (43 mph, 38 kn)
- Range: 700 km (430 mi, 380 nmi)
- Service ceiling: 2,700 m (8,900 ft)
- Rate of climb: 2.2 m/s (430 ft/min)
- Time to altitude: 1,000 m (3,300 ft) in 10 minutes
- Wing loading: 40 kg/m^{2} (8.2 lb/sq ft)
- Power/mass: 0.0830 kW/kg (0.0505 hp/lb)
