= PWS-33 Wyżeł =

Polish twin-engined military trainer aircraft

PWS-33
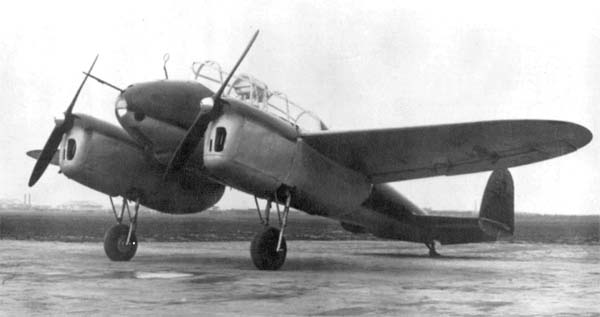

General information
- Type: Trainer aircraft
- Manufacturer: PWS
- Designer: Wacław Czerwiński
- Status: Prototypes
- Primary user: Polish Air Force
- Number built: 2 prototypes

History
- First flight: 1938

The PWS-33 Wyżeł was a Polish twin-engined military trainer aircraft from a period before World War II constructed by Podlaska Wytwórnia Samolotów or PWS ("Podlasie Aircraft Factory"). Although destined for production it got no further than the prototypes before Poland was invaded.

== Design and development ==
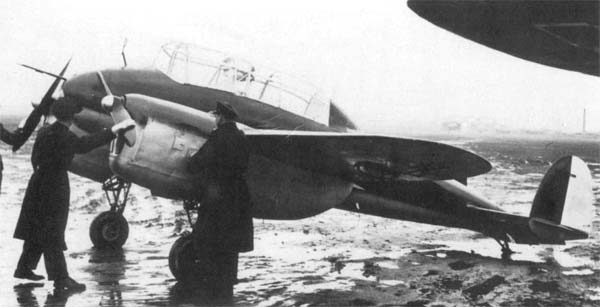
Polish twin-engined military trainer aircraft PWS-33 Wyżeł 2'nd prototype

With an expected advent of a twin-engine heavy fighter, the PZL.38 Wilk, which was supposed to be a basic fighter and bomber aircraft in the Polish Air Force, there appeared the need for a twin-engine trainer aircraft for pilots. In 1936, the PWS works were ordered to build a trainer of cheap wooden construction, similar in layout to the PZL.38. The main designer was Wacław Czerwiński, known for designing several successful sailplanes.

The prototype of the PWS-33 first flew in August–September 1938. The aircraft appeared successful with good flight characteristics and the maximum speed turned out to be even higher than had been estimated. It was given a name Wyżeł (Polish: "pointer"). The prototype was soon shown at the Paris Air Show, in November–December 1938 (under the name PZL Wyżeł) and met with an interest in the world press. In January 1939 the second prototype PWS-33/II flew. It was also capable of aerobatics. The plane was quite light and small and comparable to the single-engine trainer PWS-26.

After trials, the plane was ordered into production. In the meantime, the PZL.38 Wilk program was appearing unsuccessful due to lack of proper engines and was canceled. However the PWS-33 could still find a place as a trainer for pilots of PZL.37 Łoś medium bombers, which were also similar in appearance to the PWS-33, and for future heavy fighters such as the PZL.48 Lampart. In summer 1939 production of the first series of 25 aircraft started but they were not completed due to the outbreak of war.

== Operational history ==
After the German invasion of Poland, the first prototype was bombed in the PWS factory in Biała Podlaska in September 1939. The second damaged prototype was captured by the Germans at Warsaw-Okęcie airfield; its further fate is uncertain.

== Operators ==
Poland

- Polish Air Force

== Description ==
It was a twin-engine low-wing monoplane of wooden construction with a plywood outer skin. The fuselage was semi-monocoque, elliptic in cross-section. The enclosed cabin seated the student at the front with the instructor behind under a common canopy with rearwards sliding sections. Dual controls were fitted. Two-spar wings, with slats and flaps. Twin vertical stabilizers. Engines in underwing nacelles, duralumin covered. Retractable landing gear, with main wheels half-hidden in engine nacelles, enabling safe emergency landing, and a rear skid.

== Specification ==
Data from Polskie konstrukcje lotnicze 1893-1939

General characteristics

- Crew: 2
- Length: 6.94 m (22 ft 9 in)
- Wingspan: 9.26 m (30 ft 5 in)
- Height: 2.56 m (8 ft 5 in)
- Wing area: 12.7 m^{2} (137 sq ft)
- Aspect ratio: 6.3
- Empty weight: 950 kg (2,094 lb)
- Gross weight: 1,410 kg (3,109 lb)
- Powerplant: 2 × PZInż Major 4B 4-cylinder inverted air-cooled in-line piston engines, 97 kW (130 hp) each
- Propellers: 2-bladed Fixed pitch wooden propellers

Performance

- Maximum speed: 315 km/h (196 mph, 170 kn) (at sea level)
- Cruise speed: 260 km/h (160 mph, 140 kn) (80% power, at 1,000 m (3,300 ft))
- Range: 1,160 km (720 mi, 630 nmi)
- Service ceiling: 4,500 m (14,800 ft)
- Rate of climb: 4.5 m/s (890 ft/min)

Armament

- Guns: 1 x fixed 7.92 mm (0.312 in) PWU Wz.36 machine-gun in the fuselage
- Bombs: 2 x 12.5 kg (27.6 lb) practice bombs

== See also ==
Aircraft of comparable role, configuration, and era

- Curtiss AT-9
- Hanriot H.232
- Miles Gemini
- Reid and Sigrist R.S.1
- Reid and Sigrist R.S.3
