= Podlaska Wytwórnia Samolotów =

Polish aerospace manufacturer

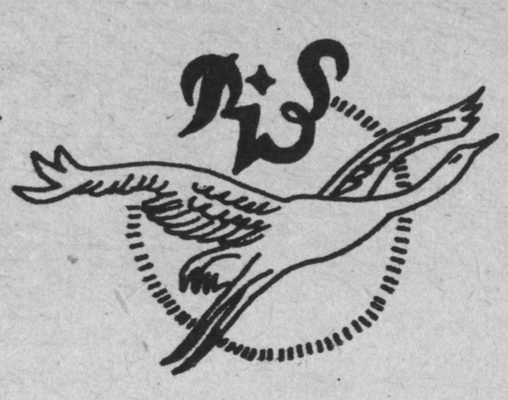
- Logo
- Industry: Aerospace
- Founded: 1923
- Founder: Antoni Ponikowski; Stanisław Rużyczka de Rosenwerth; Witold Rumbowicz
- Defunct: 1939
- Headquarters: Biała Podlaska, Poland
- Key people: August Bobek-Zdaniewski; Zbysław Ciołkosz; Stanisław Cywiński; Aleksander Grzędzielski
- Parent: PZL (1936–1939)
- Divisions: Lwowskie Warsztaty Lotnicze (1937–1939)
- Subsidiaries: Lubelska Wytwórnia Samolotów (1936–1939)

Podlaska Wytwórnia Samolotów (PWS; Podlachian Aircraft Factory) was a Polish aerospace manufacturer between 1923 and 1939, located in Biała Podlaska.

== History ==
Podlaska Wytwórnia Samolotów SA was created in 1923. The first aircraft produced were 35 Potez XV bombers for the Polish Air Force, under the French licence, built from 1925. By 1929 the company had produced 150 Potez XXV and 155 Potez 27, under French licence, and 50 PWS-A fighters, which was the Czech Avia BH-33 built under licence. It also produced 50 Bartel BM-4 trainers in 1931, designed by Samolot.

In 1925, a design office was established which included, among others, Stefan Cywiński, Zbysław Ciołkosz, August Bobek-Zdaniewski. Despite a large number of prototypes, few were produced in series. The first aircraft of their own design to be mass-produced was the PWS-10 fighter of 1930 of which 80 units were built. Smaller production runs of the PWS-14 trainer and the PWS-24 passenger aircraft were also made. The PWS-10 and PWS-24 were the first fighter and the first passenger plane of the Polish construction built in series, respectively. In 1929 the factory built a wind tunnel, the first in Poland. All PWS-designed aircraft had wooden or mixed construction.

In 1932 the PWS was nationalized to prevent its bankruptcy. It then produced 500 RWD-8 trainers (designed by RWD) and 50 of the British Avro Tutor under licence as the PWS-18 trainers. The factory then designed its own successful PWS-16 and PWS-26 advanced trainers, 320 of the latter built from 1936 to 1939.

In 1936 the factory was subordinated to the Państwowe Zakłady Lotnicze (PZL). It developed a series of projects for military planes, but they were not built due to outbreak of World War II. The PWS-33 Wyżeł twin-engine advanced trainer and the PWS-35 sports biplane were ordered into production but no aircraft were delivered before the outbreak of war.

Lwowskie Warsztaty Lotnicze (LWL, Lwów Aviation Workshops) was formed in October 1937 as a division of PWS. It built gliders, among others designated with letters PWS. Some 160 gliders were built before the war.

After the outbreak of World War II, the PWS factory was bombed by the Germans on September 4, 1939, destroying about 70% of the factory. The remains of equipment were plundered by the Soviets after their invasion of Poland.

== Aircraft ==
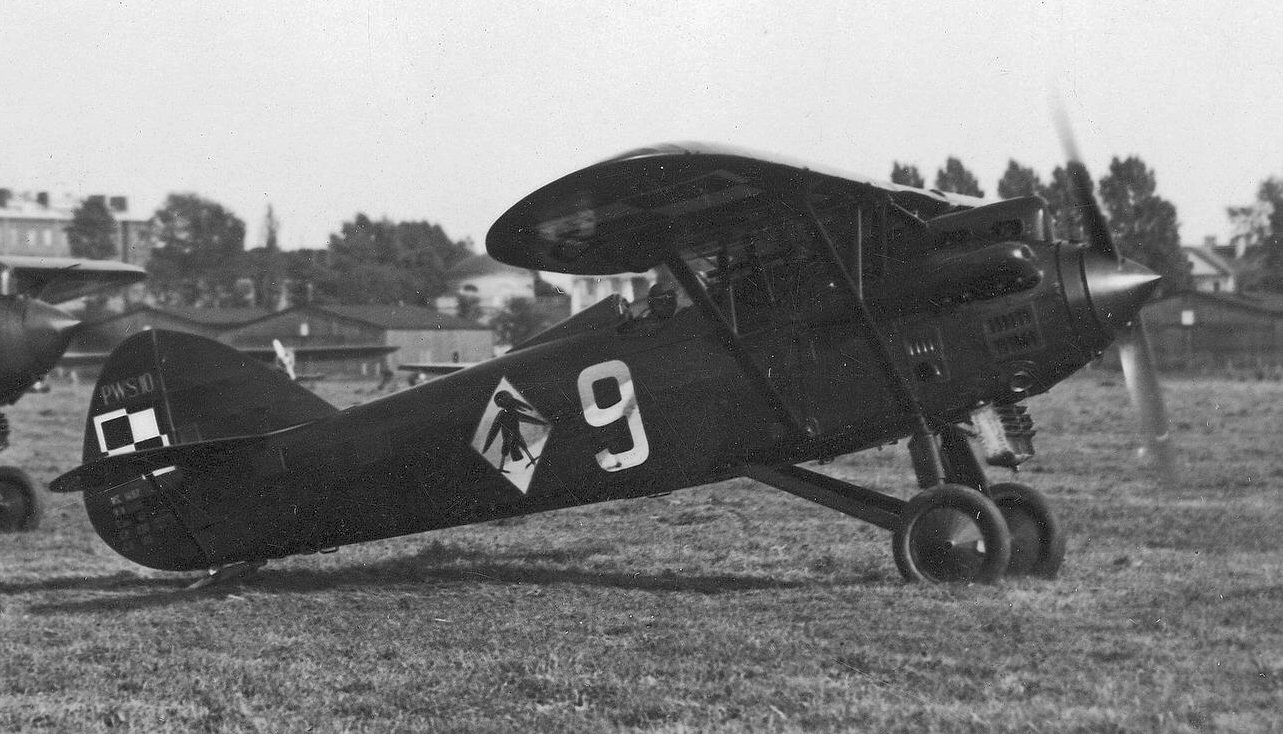
PWS-10

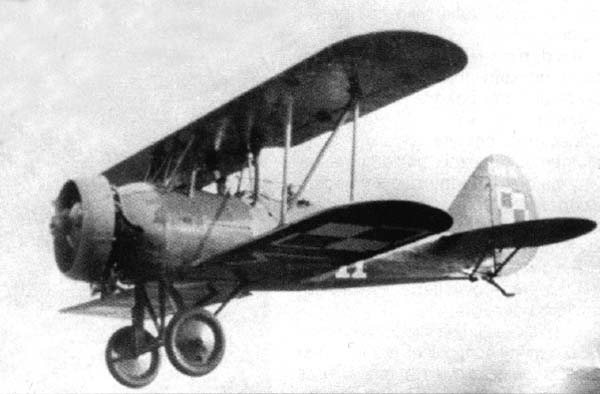
PWS-16

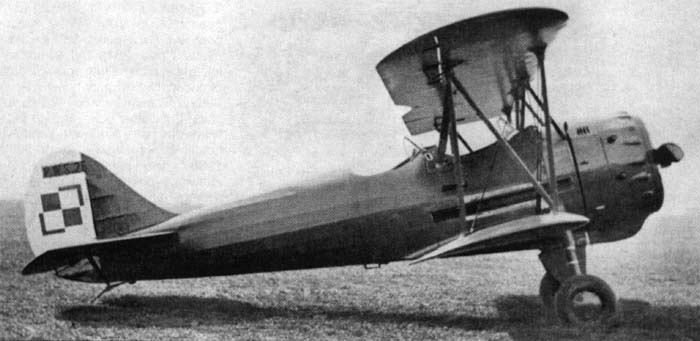
PWS-26

Model name	First flight	Number built	Type
PWS XV	1925	35	License built single engine biplane light bomber
PWS XXV		150	License built single engine biplane light bomber
PWS XXVII		155	License built single engine biplane reconnaissance airplane
PWS-A		50	License built biplane fighter
PWS-1	1927	1	Single engine monoplane fighter
PWS-2	N/A	1	Single engine monoplane trainer
PWS-3	1927	1	Single engine monoplane sport airplane
PWS-4	1928	1	Single engine monoplane sport airplane
PWS-5	1929	7	Single engine biplane liaison airplane
PWS-6	1930	1	Single engine biplane liaison airplane
PWS-7	1928	1	Single engine biplane liaison airplane
PWS-8	1929 or 1930	1	Single engine biplane sport airplane
PWS-10	1930	80	Single engine monoplane fighter
PWS-11	1929	2	Single engine monoplane trainer
PWS-12	1929	3	Single engine biplane trainer
PWS-14	1933	20	Single engine biplane trainer
PWS-16	1933	40	Single engine biplane trainer
PWS-18	1935	40	License built single engine biplane trainer
PWS-19	1931	1	Single engine monoplane light bomber
PWS-20	1929	2	Single engine monoplane airliner
PWS-21	1930	1	Single engine monoplane airliner
PWS-24	1931	11	Single engine monoplane airliner
PWS-26	1935	320	Single engine biplane trainer
PWS-33 Wyżeł	1938	2	Twin engine monoplane trainer
PWS-35	1938	2	Single engine biplane trainer
PWS-40 Junak	1939	1	Single engine monoplane trainer
PWS-50	1930	1	Single engine monoplane sport airplane
PWS-51	1930	1	Single engine monoplane sport airplane
PWS-52	1930	1	Single engine monoplane sport airplane
PWS-54	1933	1	Single engine monoplane airliner
PWS-101	1937	12	Glider
PWS-102 Rekin	1939	2	Glider
PWS-103	1939 or 1940	2	Glider
