= PWS-10 =

Polish interwar fighter plane

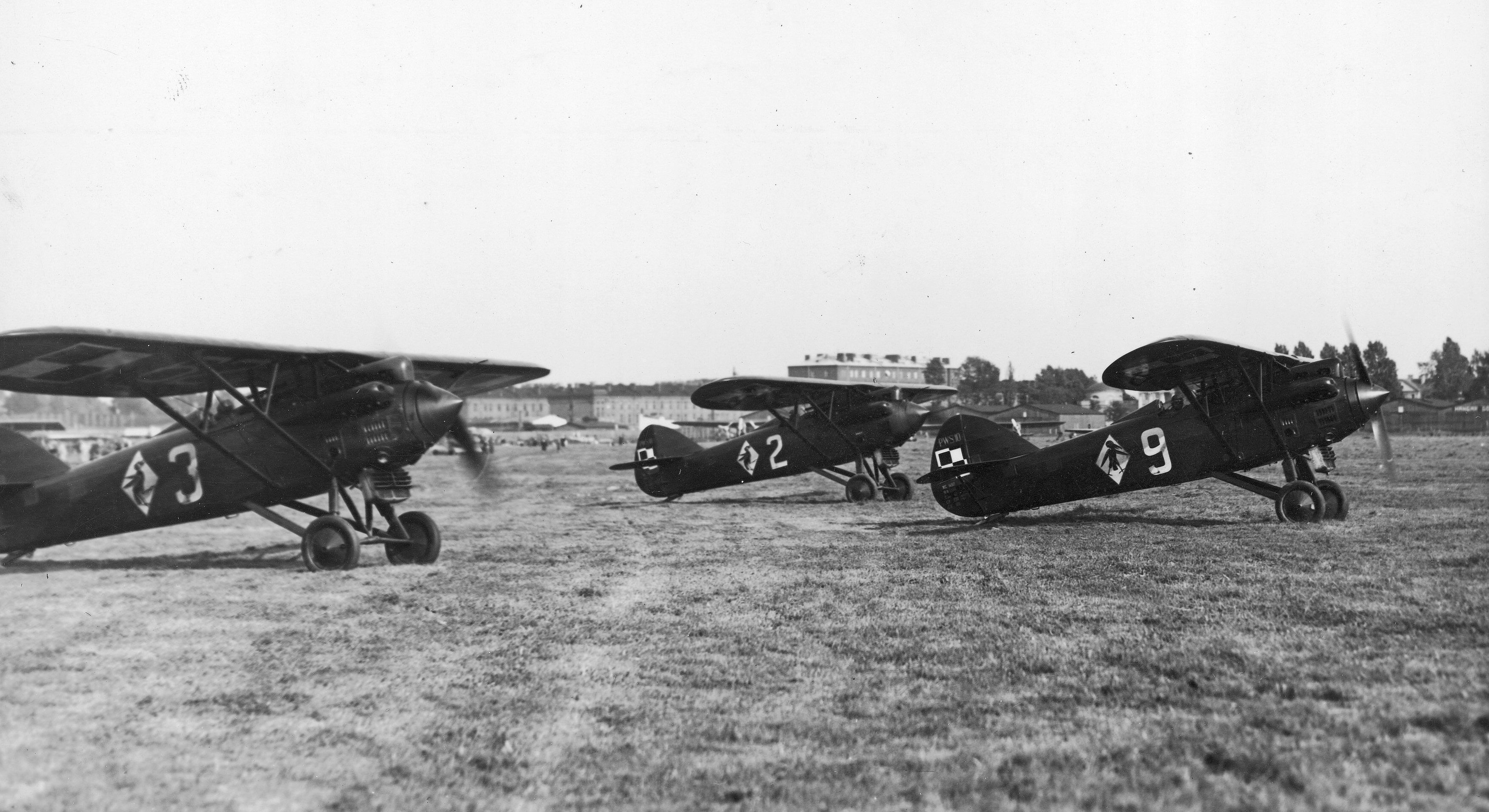

General information
- Type: Fighter aircraft
- Manufacturer: PWS
- Primary users: Polish Air Force Spanish Air Force
- Number built: 80

History
- Manufactured: 1931-1932
- Introduction date: 1932
- First flight: March 1930
- Retired: 1939

The PWS-10 was a Polish fighter aircraft, constructed in the PWS (Podlaska Wytwórnia Samolotów - Podlasie Aircraft Factory). It was the first Polish-designed fighter to enter serial production.

== Design and development ==
First work on a domestic fighter to replace ill-fated French SPAD 61s in the Polish Air Force was initiated by PWS in 1927. The main designers were Aleksander Grzędzielski and Augustyn Zdaniewski. In 1929 the prototype was built and it first flew in March 1930. At the same time, the more modern fighter PZL P.1 was developed by the PZL. Despite the P.1 being a more capable fighter, the War Ministry decided that it needed further work, and a series of 80 PWS-10 was ordered as a temporary measure. In comparison with the advanced P.1, the PWS-10 was a more classic design, a high-wing parasol monoplane of mixed construction.

The series was built from 1931 to 1932, numbered from 5-1 to 5-80.

A variant of PWS-10 was a biplane PWS-15, being PWS-10 with another pair of wings. A single prototype was made to compare with a monoplane, on the factory's initiative. It first flew in the spring of 1931. It offered better maneuverability and climb ratio with a slightly lower maximum speed. PWS-15 was not produced and was soon broken up.

=== Description ===
Mixed construction high-wing parasol monoplane, canvas and plywood covered. A fuselage of a metal frame, covered with duralumin in the front section and canvas in the rear section. Two-spar elliptic wings, of wooden construction, canvas, and plywood covered. Stabilizers, rudder, and elevator of metal construction, canvas-covered. Open pilot's cockpit, with a windshield. Conventional fixed landing gear, with a rear skid. Engine: 12-cylinder water-cooled inline W engine Lorraine-Dietrich LD-12Eb, built by license in Polish Skoda Works. Water radiator under a fuselage front. Two-blade wooden propeller of a fixed pitch. Fuel tank 280 L in a fuselage. Armament: two fixed 7.7 mm Vickers machineguns with interrupter gear, in hull sides.

== Operational history ==
PWS-10 entered service in the Polish Air Force starting from 1932. It was used in cadres nos. 122, 131, 132, 141. Their flight characteristics and performance were mediocre. As soon, as in 1933 they were replaced in combat units by PZL P.7 and moved to aviation school in Dęblin. Some were used there by the outbreak of World War II and in summer 1939 all remaining airworthy aircraft were gathered in Ułęż.

In November 1936, during the Spanish Civil War, 20 PWS-10 were sold in secret to the Spanish Nationalists, via Portuguese company, by the SEPEWE syndicate. Officially their destination was South America. Aircraft were transported in crates and were assembled in Leon by PZL workers by January 1937. First aircraft was flown on 31 December 1936 by a Polish pilot. Being obsolete by then, they were not used as fighters, only for fighter pilot training (for 4. Fighter Group) in El Copero near Seville. Later PWS-10s were transferred to Jerez de la Frontera where they flew between April 1937 and the end of 1938. Spanish aircraft received the name Chiquita, or unofficial Pavipollo and they had numbers from 4-1 to 4-20. Some were lost in crashes or scrapped, the remaining 11 were operated till the end of the 1938 and were retired in 1939.

During the German invasion of Poland in September 1939, they were too obsolete to be used in combat, but some were used for reconnaissance flights in an improvised Dęblin Group during first days of the war.

== Variants ==
- PWS-10 : Single-seat fighter biplane.
- PWS-10M : This was the original designation of the PWS-10.
- PWS-15 : PWS-10 with a new wing, one conversion only, not successful.

== Operators ==
Poland

- Polish Air Force

Spanish State

- Spanish Air Force

== Specifications ==
Data from Polish Aircraft 1893–1939

General characteristics

- Crew: 1
- Length: 7.5 m (24 ft 7 in)
- Wingspan: 11 m (36 ft 1 in)
- Height: 2.7 m (8 ft 10 in)
- Wing area: 18 m^{2} (190 sq ft)
- Empty weight: 1,115 kg (2,458 lb)
- Gross weight: 1,500 kg (3,307 lb)
- Max takeoff weight: 1,550 kg (3,417 lb)
- Powerplant: 1 × Lorraine-Dietrich 12Eb W-12 water-cooled piston engine, 340 kW (450 hp)
- Propellers: 2-bladed fixed-pitch propeller

Performance

- Maximum speed: 258 km/h (160 mph, 139 kn) at sea level
- Range: 300 km (190 mi, 160 nmi)
- Service ceiling: 6,500 m (21,300 ft)
- Time to altitude: 5 min 40 sec to 3,000 m (9,800 ft)

Armament

- Guns: 2 x 7.7 mm Vickers machine guns

== See also ==
Related lists

- List of aircraft of World War II

== Bibliography ==
- Arraez Cerda, Juan (December 2001). "Les avions polonais de l'aviation nationaliste: PWS-10 et RWD-13" [Polish Aircraft of the Nationalist Air Force: The PWS-10 and RWD-13]. Avions: Toute l'Aéronautique et son histoire (in French). No. 105. pp. 38–43. ISSN 1243-8650.
- Cynk, Jerzy B. (1971). Polish Aircraft 1893–1939. London: Putnam. ISBN 0-370-00085-4.
- Morgała, Andrzej (2003). Samoloty wojskowe w Polsce 1924–1939 [Military aircraft in Poland 1924–1939] (in Polish). Warsaw: Bellona. ISBN 83-11-09319-9.
- Williams, Anthony G.; Gustin, Emmanuel G. (2003). Flying Guns: World War I and its Aftermath 1914–32. Ramsbury, UK: Airlife Publishing. ISBN 1-84037-396-2.
