= PWS-40 Junak =

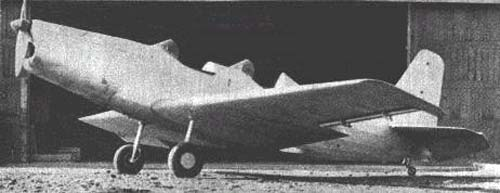

General information
- Type: Trainer
- National origin: Poland
- Manufacturer: Podlaska Wytwórnia Samolotów
- Designer: Antoni Zagórski
- Status: prototype only

History
- First flight: April 1939

PWS-40 Junak (Junak literally means "brave young man") was a Polish trainer aircraft of the 1930s. First flown in the spring of 1939, it was to become the standard training aircraft of the Polish Air Force's fighter pilot schools before more advanced trainers could be delivered. However, due to the outbreak of World War II only the prototype was completed and test-flown.

A two-seat low-wing monoplane of wooden design, the PWS-40 had a trapezoidal wing covered with plywood and canvass. The plywood-covered fuselage was equipped with two open cabins. The plane had a fixed undercarriage.

== Design and development ==
By the mid-1930s the need for a low-wing trainer aircraft became apparent and various Polish manufacturers started submitting designs to the Air Force. In late 1936 Antoni Zagórski of the Warsaw-based PZL works designed a simple trainer and sports plane powered by a Train engine. In 1937, together with Jerzy Zbrożek he rectified the design. The modified design was powered by a stronger Avia 3 engine (a clone of the BMW IIIa engine) and was named ZZ, after the initials of the designer team. However, their own company was not interested in the design and in early 1938 it was sold to the Podlaska Wytwórnia Samolotów (PWS) instead.

The PWS further modified the design, now named PWS-40 Junak, with several features cloned from a Tipsy S.2 sports plane bought the previous year for testing; additional influence came from British de Havilland DH-94 Moth Minor. The PWS intended the new plane to be a competition for heavier and more expensive home-produced trainers, including RWD-16 bis and RWD-23.

The prototype was test-flown in late April 1939 and delivered to the Institute of Aviation for further tests. The design proved promising, but certain teething problems had to be straightened out before serial production. The serial production was to start in the autumn of 1939 both in PWS and in its subsidiary in Lvov, the Lwowskie Warsztaty Lotnicze. However, the outbreak of World War II prevented any further works on both the second prototype (under construction by the time the factory was destroyed) and the first series. The first prototype was captured intact by the Germans, but its further fate remains unknown.

== Variants ==
At the time of the invasion of Poland the PWS was also working on a thoroughly modernised version of the PWS-40. Equipped with a much more powerful engine delivering 176–221 kilowatts (236–296 hp), the new aircraft was to have a smaller wingspan (9.5 metres (31 ft)), flaps and a retractable landing gear. The designers also envisaged an advanced fighter trainer, armed with machine guns and powered with a 331 kilowatts (444 hp) engine.

== Specifications (PWS-40 Junak) ==
General characteristics

- Crew: 2
- Length: 7.3 m (23 ft 11 in)
- Wingspan: 10.2 m (33 ft 6 in)
- Height: 2.0 m (6 ft 7 in)
- Wing area: 13.1 m^{2} (141 sq ft)
- Empty weight: 340 kg (750 lb)
- Gross weight: 240 kg (529 lb)
- Max takeoff weight: 580 kg (1,279 lb)
- Powerplant: 1 × Avia 3 in-line, 44 kW (60 hp)

Performance

- Maximum speed: 170 km/h (110 mph, 92 kn)
- Cruise speed: 145 km/h (90 mph, 78 kn)
- Minimum control speed: 70 km/h (43 mph, 38 kn)
- Range: 500 km (310 mi, 270 nmi)
- Service ceiling: 3,200 m (10,500 ft)
- Rate of climb: 2.5 m/s (490 ft/min)

== See also ==
Aircraft of comparable role, configuration, and era

- Tipsy S.2
- de Havilland Moth Minor
