= Józef Lewoniewski =

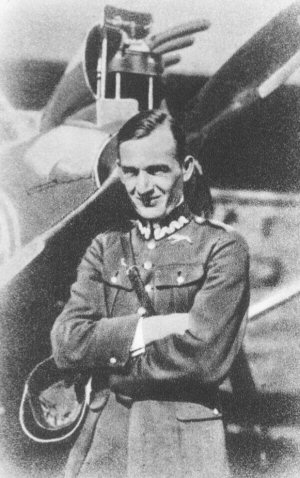
- Born: 20 March 1899
- Died: September 11, 1933 (aged 34)

Józef Lewoniewski (20 March 1899 – 11 September 1933) was a Polish military and sports aviator. He was a brother of the Soviet aviator Sigizmund Levanevsky.

He was born in Russia to a Polish family. In May 1919 he returned to independent Poland and served in the Polish Army, in a cavalry, during Polish-Soviet war. In 1923 he volunteered for the air force and completed an aviation school in Bydgoszcz, then in France. He served as a fighter pilot, in a rank of Flying Captain (kapitan pilot).

Lewoniewski was also active in sports flying. In 1930 he participated in Challenge 1930 International Tourist Aircraft Contest, flying PWS-51, but he had to withdraw due to oil pipe damage. On 15 August 1931 he flew a PWS-52 plane around Poland non-stop in 12 hours 35 minutes, covering 1755 km. On 1 September 1931 he flew the same plane from Warszaw to Saloniki and back (2700 km). Next he came with an idea of flying around the world in PWS-52 aircraft, but it was abandoned due to lack of funding. From March 1933 he worked in Aviation Technical Research Institute in Warsaw as a test pilot.

On 11 September 1933 Józef Lewoniewski with Colonel Czesław Filipowicz, attempted at breaking world's record of flight distance in tourist planes category, on Warsaw - Krasnoyarsk route, flying modified PZL.19 plane. After 8 and a half hours, the plane went into a spin due to an air turbulence, it was brought under control, but it was too low and it hit the ground near Kazan. Lewoniewski was killed, while Filipowicz was slightly injured.
