= PWS 3 =

1920s Polish light aircraft

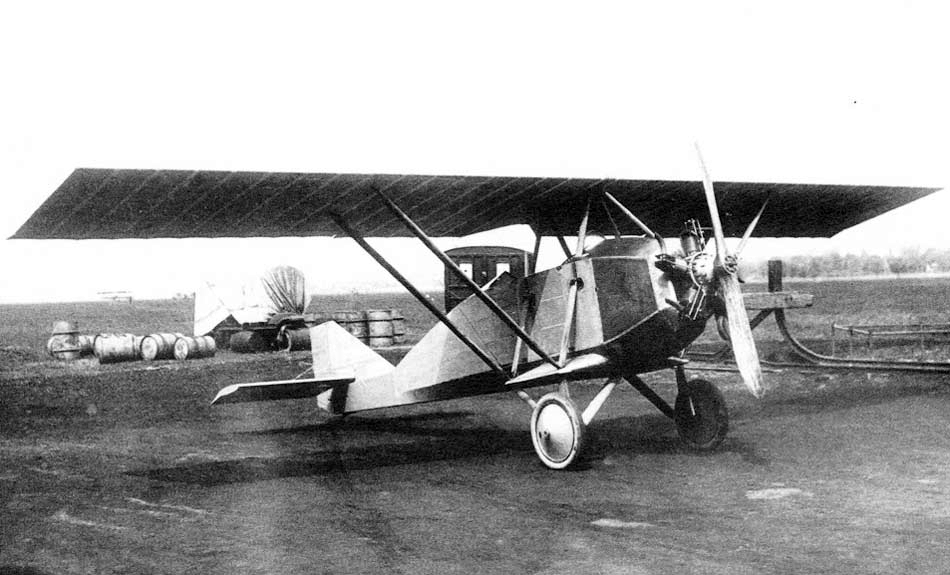
- PWS 3B and engine Walter NZ-60

General information
- Type: Sports aircraft
- Manufacturer: PWS
- Status: prototype
- Number built: 1

History
- First flight: 20 May 1927

The PWS 3 was a Polish sport aircraft, developed in 1927 by PWS (Podlaska Wytwórnia Samolotów - Podlasie Aircraft Factory), which remained a prototype.

== Design and development ==
The PWS 3 was the first sports aircraft manufactured by the Polish aerospace industry (not counting earlier amateur designs). It was designed by Stanisław Cywiński in the PWS factory in 1927. Its interesting feature was a fuselage built upon a bottom boom, what made possible changing of upper fuselage part with cockpits, and developing single-seater, two-seater or other specialized variants.

The prototype of the PWS 3, designated PWS 3B, was flown on 20 May 1927 at Biała Podlaska. After trials, a rudder got improved. In 1928 the plane underwent a modification, receiving rounded wingtips instead of square ones, and smaller ailerons.

== Operational history ==
The prototype PWS 3B was given a registration number P-PWSS, from 1930: SP-ACJ. It took part in the 1st Polish Light Aircraft Contest on 6–9 October 1927, taking the 2nd place (after JD-2 aircraft). Later it was bought by the LOPP paramilitary organization in Lublin and used for propaganda flights.

== Construction ==
The PWS 3 was a two-seater parasol wing braced monoplane of wooden construction. The fuselage was built around a box-section wooden boom, with a kind of superstructure of wood strips, covered with plywood in front and aircraft fabric fairing in the rear. The engine compartment was covered with duralumin sheeting. The empennage was wooden, with the fixed surfaces plywood covered and fabric on the control surfaces. The rectangular wooden wings had two spars, and were covered with plywood in front and fabric in the rear. Initially it had slotted ailerons on all span, later shortened. The fuselage had two cockpits in tandem, with windscreens and dual controls. The undercarriage consisted of a fixed split axle conventional landing gear, with a rear skid. Both main undercarriage struts and wing struts were fixed to small horizontal winglets at the bottom of fuselage sides. Fuel was carried in two tanks, 100 L capacity in total, in a central wing section.

The 5-cylinder Walter NZ 60 air-cooled radial engine was giving a nominal power of 60 hp and take-off power of 65 hp, driving a two-blade fixed pitch wooden propeller. A cruise fuel consumption was 22 L/h.

== Specification (PWS 3B) ==
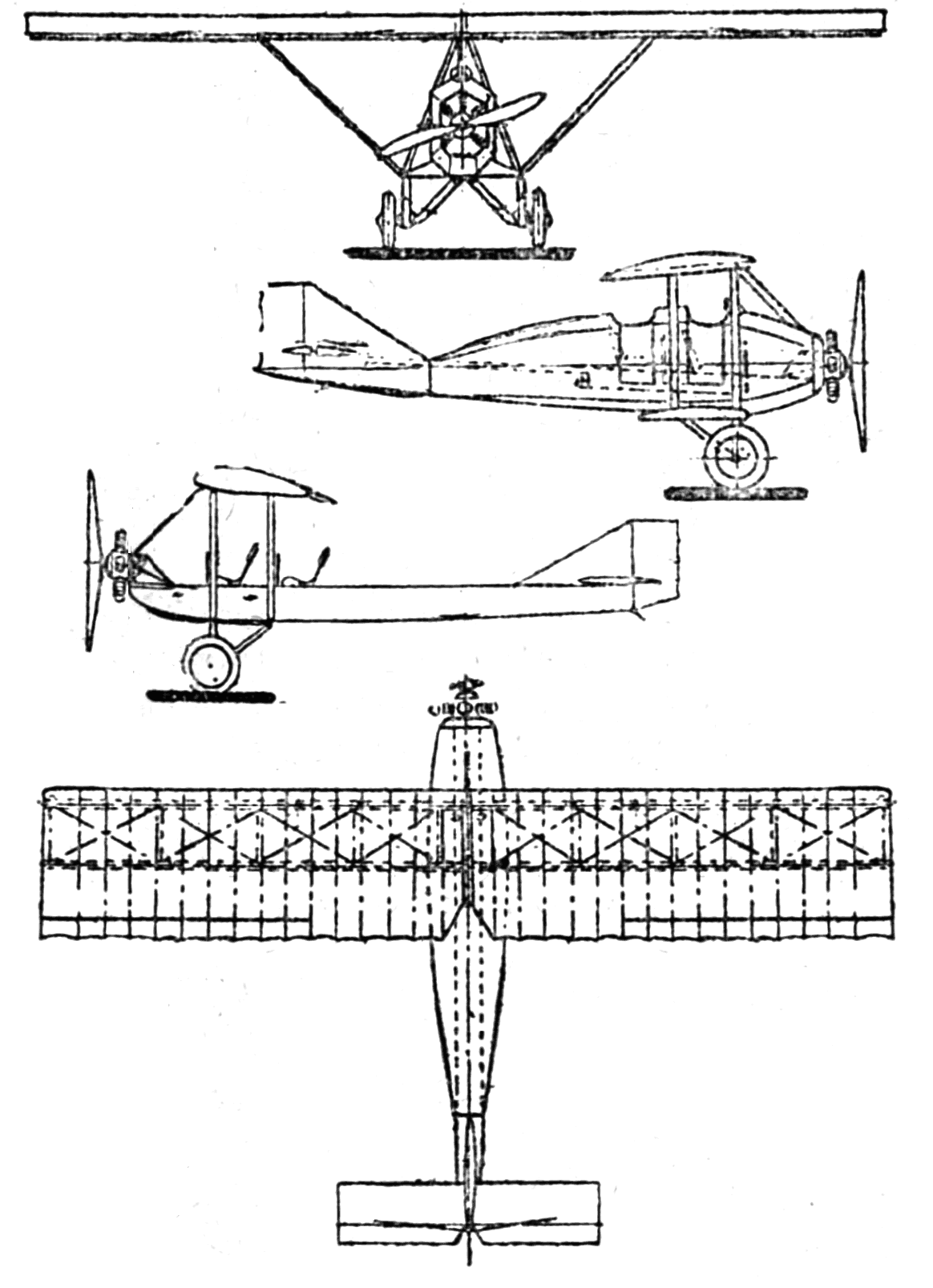
PWS 3 3-view drawing from Le Document aéronautique November,1927

Data from Jane's all the World's Aircraft 1928, Polish Aircraft 1893–1939, Polskie konstrukcje lotnicze 1893-1939

General characteristics

- Crew: 1
- Capacity: 1
- Length: 6.93 m (22 ft 9 in)
- Wingspan: 9.7 m (31 ft 10 in)
- Height: 2.6 m (8 ft 6 in)
- Wing area: 16.75 m^{2} (180.3 sq ft)
- Empty weight: 416 kg (917 lb)
- Gross weight: 662 kg (1,459 lb)
- Fuel capacity: 100 L (26 US gal; 22 imp gal) in two tanks
- Powerplant: 1 × Walter NZ 60 5-cylinder air-cooled radial piston engine, 45 kW (60 hp)
- Propellers: 2-bladed fixed pitch wooden propeller

Performance

- Maximum speed: 133 km/h (83 mph, 72 kn)
- Cruise speed: 123 km/h (76 mph, 66 kn)
- Stall speed: 65 km/h (40 mph, 35 kn)
- Range: 500 km (310 mi, 270 nmi)
- Service ceiling: 2,500 m (8,200 ft)
- Rate of climb: 1.7 m/s (330 ft/min)
- Wing loading: 39.5 kg/m^{2} (8.1 lb/sq ft)
- Power/mass: 0.0718 kW/kg (0.0437 hp/lb)
