= Avro 626 =

1930 multi-role military aircraft

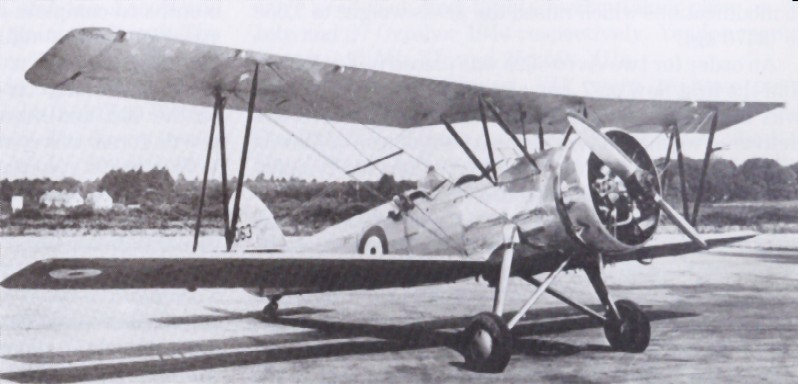
- Avro Prefect K5063 at Martlesham, July 1935

General information
- Type: General purpose
- Manufacturer: Avro
- Designer: Roy Chadwick
- Number built: 198

History
- First flight: 1930
- Retired: 1945
- Developed from: Avro 621

The Avro 626 is a single-engined British biplane trainer aircraft produced by Avro during the (1918-1939) inter-war period.

== Design and development ==
The Model 626 was developed by Avro from the company's Model 621 (Tutor) for export to smaller air forces, the idea being that the 626 would be a single aircraft that could carry out general aircrew training as well as a number of other roles. The types 621 and 626 were both two-seaters, but the latter had an additional cockpit behind the rear seat of the 621 and accessible from it. This additional cockpit was fitted with a Scarff ring for a machine gun and carried equipment for air navigation, wireless and gunnery training. Structurally and aerodynamically, it was almost identical to the Tutor: it had a conventional fabric-covered, metal airframe with single-bay wings. Most of the 626s, like the Tutors had an Armstrong Siddeley Lynx IVC engine of 240 hp (180 kW), but most of those supplied to the Egyptian and Brazilian Air Forces used a 260 hp (190 kW) Cheetah V from the same maker.

The usual undercarriage used split, fixed mainwheels and either a tailskid or later a tailwheel, but some 621s appeared on floats and on skis.

The prototype was first flown in 1930.

== Operational history ==
Avro employed an aggressive sales and marketing effort to introduce the Model 626 to customers throughout the world. An early production demonstration aircraft, marked G-ABFM was sent by sea to South America in 1931. After demonstrations in Buenos Aires and a record-setting flight over the Andes, the aircraft was commandeered by Argentine military officials to help quell a local uprising. The 626 performed so well that an order was immediately placed for 14 additional aircraft. The biggest users were the Air Forces of Chile, Greece, and Portugal. Numerous sales were made to foreign air forces up to 1939, some of which survived in second-line service until 1945.

The 621 was not a civil type, though some did briefly appear on the civil registers of the UK (15) and Hong Kong (6). These markings were worn for testing, demonstration and export; only two civil machines stayed on the prewar U.K.register. After the war, two R.A.F. Prefects were civilianised, as was one in New Zealand.

== Variants ==
- Avro 626: Two seat multi-purpose aircraft
- Avro Prefect: RAF and RNZAF name for the 626; in the period most RAF aircraft received names. All RNZAF Prefects had three cockpits. All the RAF machines were two-seat navigational training aircraft without the third cockpit installed.
- Avro 637: Armed patrol version of the Avro 626. Pilot had a .303 in (7.7 mm) Vickers machine gun mounted on the fuselage while the observer/gunner was armed with a .303 in (7.7 mm) Lewis Gun on an Avro low-drag mounting. This variant featured a slightly larger wingspan with rounded wingtips. Eight aircraft were sold to the Kwangsi Air Force (Government of South China) in China.
- Tatra T.126: Licence built 626, manufactured in Czechoslovakia; two versions proposed: one with 355 hp (265 kW) Avia Rk. 17 and export version for Turkey and the Balkans with a 260 hp (190 kW) Armstrong Siddeley Cheetah V. Only one built, possibly never flown because of the Munich crisis - factory was in the territory occupied by Germany.

== Operators ==
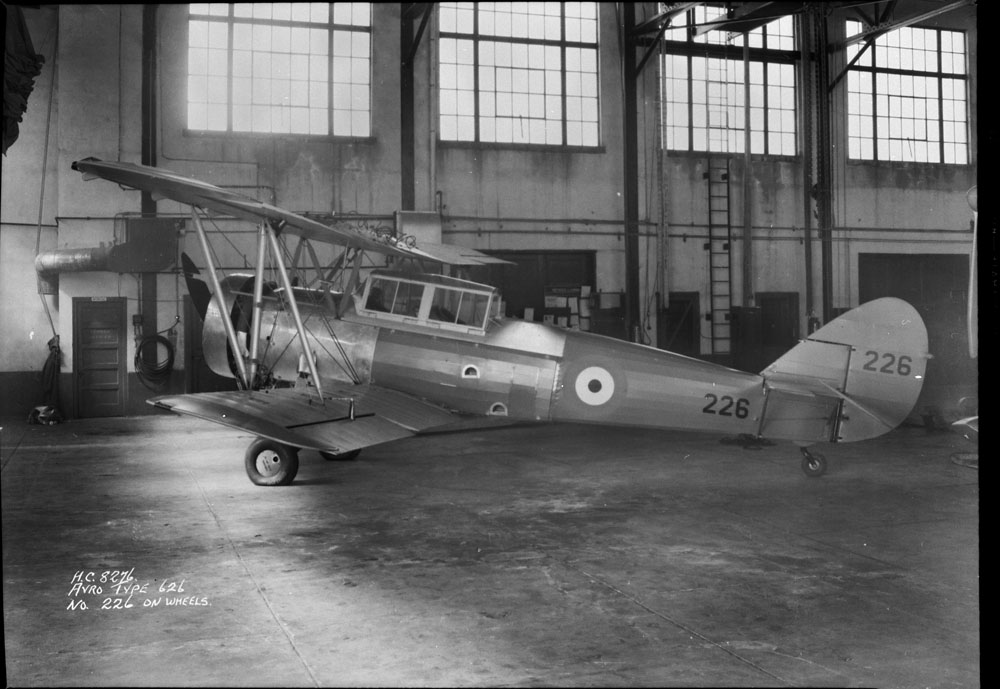
Avro 626 of Royal Canadian Air Force

198 Avro 626s and Prefects were produced.

Argentina
Army Aviation Service received 15 aircraft. (Note: The Avro 626 is listed in some sources as having been used by the Argentine Air Force. This is because its predecessor, the Army Aviation Service, was established in 1912 and dissolved in 1945 when the Air Force was created.)
Austria
Austrian Air Force received seven aircraft.
Belgium
Belgian Air Force received 12 aircraft, two of which were still in service at the time of the German invasion in 1940.
Brazil
Brazilian Air Force received 16 aircraft.
Canada
Royal Canadian Air Force received 12 aircraft. RCAF machines featured cold weather cowlings, enclosed cockpits and skis. They survived until early in the Second World War.

- 3 Squadron RCAF
- 111 squadron RCAF

China
Chinese Nationalist Air Force - Probably received 13, certainly 11. May have built one itself. All served in the Second Sino-Japanese War.
Chile
Chilean Air Force received 20 aircraft.
Czechoslovakia
Czechoslovak Air Force received one aircraft. Tatra under licence manufactured only one because of the Munich crisis.
Egypt
Royal Egyptian Air Force received 27 machines, their first military aircraft, as distinct from DH-60 Moths. Only 25 served, as two were lost in delivery and replaced Egyptian 626s served from 1933 until 1944.
Estonia
Estonian Air Force received four aircraft.
Greece
Hellenic Air Force received 21 aircraft which were in service at the time of the Italian invasion. Three machines escaped the fall of Greece to join the RAF in the desert.
Ireland
Irish Air Corps received four aircraft, which served until 1941.
Lithuania
Lithuanian Air Force received three aircraft in 1937-1939. The type was still in service at the time of the Soviet invasion and occupation.
New Zealand
Royal New Zealand Air Force received four Lynx-engined but three-cockpit Prefect aircraft for the RNZAF in 1935.

- No 1 Flying Training School.

Portugal
Portuguese Air Force and Portuguese Navy received 26 aircraft directly from Avro. A manufacturing licence was issued to the Portuguese factory OGMA, but it is not known how many were built by them.
Slovakia

- Slovak Air Force

Spanish Republic

- Spanish Republican Air Force operated uncertain number of aircraft in the Spanish Civil War. These did not come direct from Avro company.

United Kingdom
Royal Air Force received seven two-seater Prefects for air navigation training. Delivered in 1935, they operated during the Second World War on miscellaneous duties.

== Survivors ==
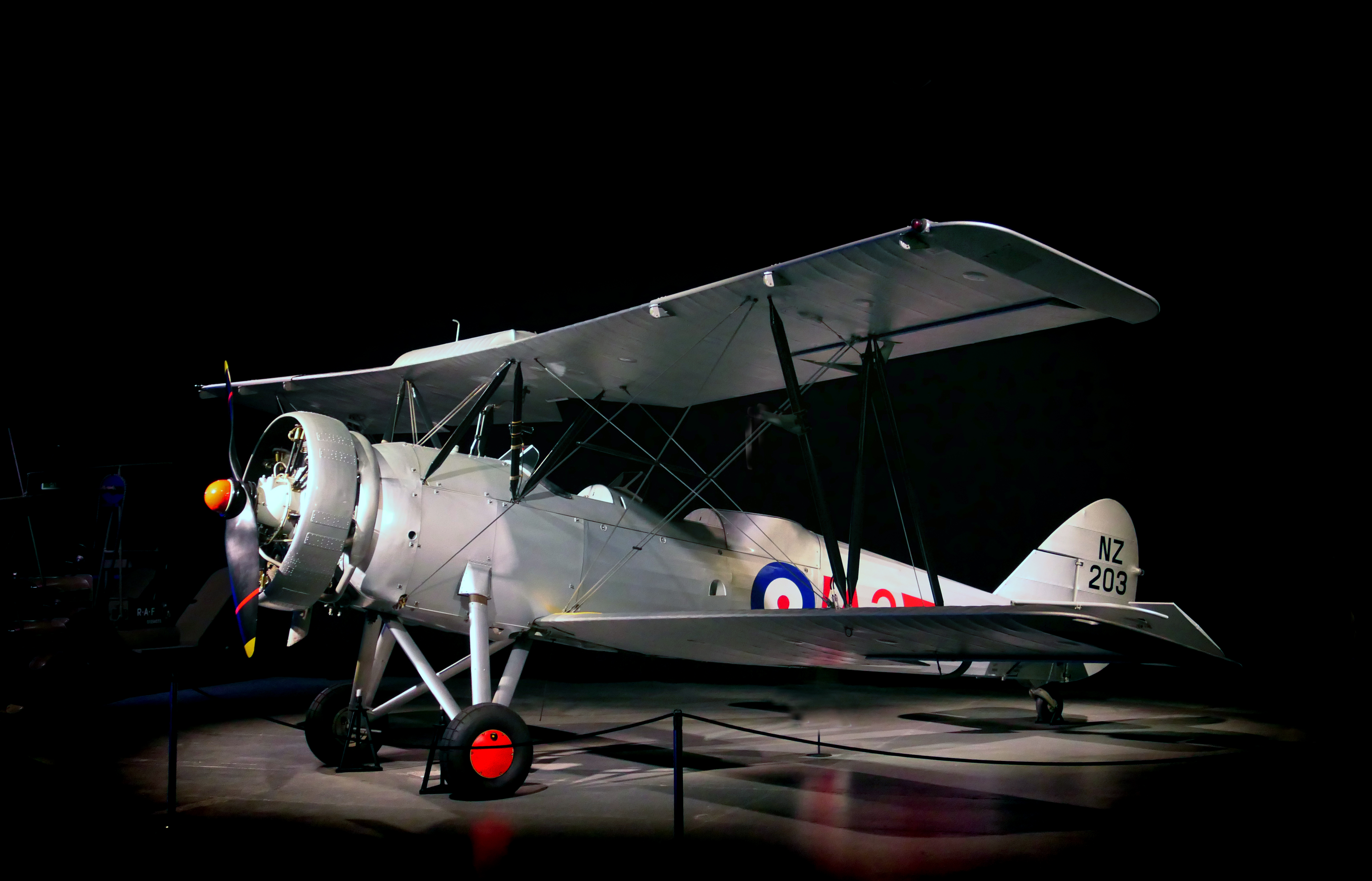
NZ203 on display at the Royal New Zealand Air Force Museum in 2022

NZ203, c/n 811, survived the war and was purchased by Mr. J. Frogley in 1948 who registered it as ZK-APC.The aircraft ceased flying in 1958 but in the 1980s it was acquired by the Royal New Zealand Air Force Museum and returned to the air, including as part of the RNZAF Historic Flight. It is the sole surviving active Avro Prefect.

== Specifications (Avro 626 (Lynx IVC landplane)) ==
Data from Avro Aircraft since 1908

General characteristics

- Crew: 2
- Length: 26 ft 6 in (8.08 m)
- Wingspan: 34 ft 0 in (10.36 m)
- Height: 9 ft 7 in (2.92 m)
- Wing area: 300 sq ft (28 m^{2})
- Empty weight: 1,765 lb (801 kg)
- Gross weight: 2,750 lb (1,247 kg)
- Powerplant: 1 × Armstrong Siddeley Lynx IVC 7-cylinder air-cooled radial piston engine, 210 hp (160 kW)
- Propellers: 2-bladed fixed-pitch propeller

Performance

- Maximum speed: 112 mph (180 km/h, 97 kn)
- Cruise speed: 95 mph (153 km/h, 83 kn)
- Range: 240 mi (390 km, 210 nmi)
- Service ceiling: 14,800 ft (4,500 m)
- Rate of climb: 880 ft/min (4.5 m/s)

== See also ==
Related development Avro 504 - predecessor of the Avro 621/626 Related lists

- List of interwar military aircraft
- List of aircraft of the Spanish Republican Air Force
