= PWS-18 =

1930s Polish trainer aircraft

General information
- Type: Trainer aircraft
- Manufacturer: PWS
- Primary user: Polish military aviation
- Number built: 40

History
- Manufactured: 1935-1936
- Retired: 1939
- Developed from: Avro Tutor

The PWS-18 was a Polish trainer aircraft, used from 1937 to 1939 by the Polish Air Force, a modified licence variant of the British Avro Tutor.

== Development ==
In 1934, the Polish government, looking for an intermediate military trainer, bought two Avro Tutor trainer aircraft together with a licence to produce the aircraft. Production was ordered in the PWS (Podlaska Wytwórnia Samolotów - Podlasie Aircraft Factory). In 1935, Antoni Uszacki of the PWS modified the design, fitting it with a Wright Whirlwind engine, produced under licence in Poland. The new engine cowling was much longer than the previous Townend ring type, with a carburetor air intake below it. The wing construction was changed from metal to wooden, better fitted to PWS capabilities, and the rectangular wing tips were rounded. Also some other details were changed, such as a tailskid instead of a tailwheel.

A series of 40 aircraft was built in 1935-1936 (1936-1937 according to some references). They were assigned military numbers 80-1 to 80-40. They were not produced in larger numbers because a successful indigenous Polish advanced trainer, the PWS-26, using the same engine, was designed and entered production.

== Operational history ==
PWS-18s were used in the Polish military aviation, among others in Airforce Training Center in Dęblin, an NCO school for minors in Bydgoszcz and in training escadres of air regiments. None survived World War II.

== Operators ==
Poland

- Polish Air Force

== Specifications ==
Data from Poser - PWS - Podlaska Wytwórnia Samolotów : PWS-50, Polish Aircraft 1893–1939

General characteristics

- Crew: 2
- Length: 8.02 m (26 ft 4 in)
- Wingspan: 10.97 m (36 ft 0 in)
- Height: 2.92 m (9 ft 7 in)
- Wing area: 29.2 m^{2} (314 sq ft)
- Empty weight: 900 kg (1,984 lb)
- Gross weight: 1,250 kg (2,756 lb)
- Fuel capacity: 150 L (40 US gal; 33 imp gal)
- Powerplant: 1 × PZL-Wright J-5B Whirlwind 9-cylinder air-cooled radial piston engine, 160 kW (220 hp)
- Propellers: 2-bladed Szomański fixed-pitch propeller

Performance

- Maximum speed: 200 km/h (120 mph, 110 kn) at sea level
- Cruise speed: 170 km/h (110 mph, 92 kn)
- Stall speed: 70 km/h (43 mph, 38 kn)
- Range: 465 km (289 mi, 251 nmi)
- Service ceiling: 4,950 m (16,240 ft)
- Rate of climb: 5 m/s (980 ft/min)
- Time to altitude: 3,000 m (9,800 ft) in 16 minutes 10 seconds
- Wing loading: 42.8 kg/m^{2} (8.8 lb/sq ft)
- Power/mass: 0.130 kW/kg (0.079 hp/lb)

Armament

- Guns: 1 x 7.92 mm (0.312 in) machinegun, pilot's or observer's (optional),
- Bombs: 2 x 12 kg (26 lb) bombs (optional)

== See also ==
Related development

- Avro Tutor

Aircraft of comparable role, configuration, and era

- PWS-26
