= PWS-102 Rekin =

PWS-102
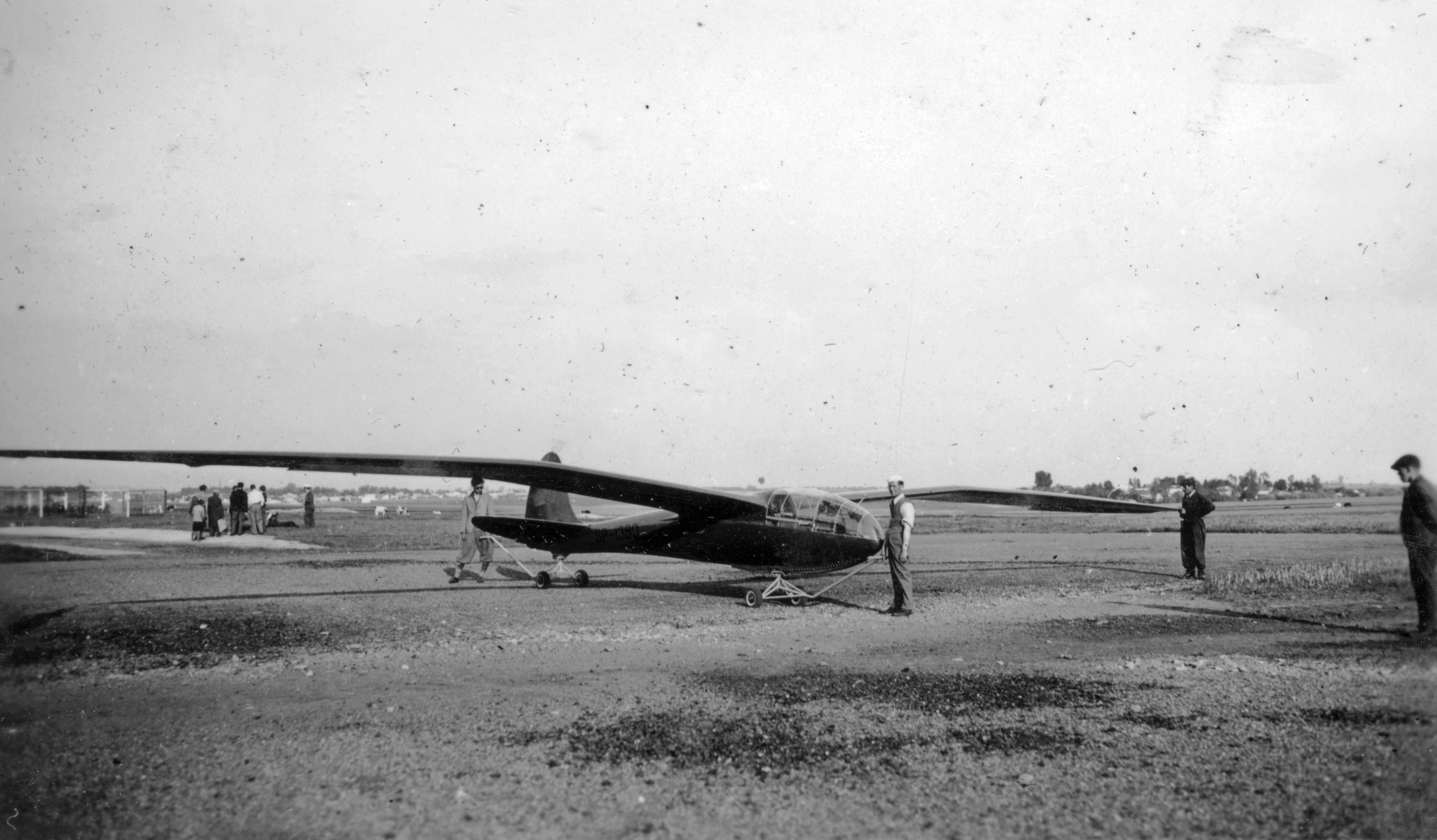
- The PWS-102 Rekin on its ground manoeuvring dollies

General information
- Type: High performance sailplane
- National origin: Poland
- Manufacturer: PWS
- Designer: Wacław Czerwiński and Józef Niespał
- Number built: 2

History
- First flight: March 1939
- Developed from: PWS-101

The PWS-102 Rekin (English: Shark) was a progressive development of the PWS-101, intended for cross-country flights. The prototype flew in an international contest in 1939 and the first of a projected production series was flown before the start of World War II.

== Design and development ==
The PWS-102 was the second sailplane built by PWS, based in Biała Podlaska. Like the first it was designed by the experienced Wacław Czerwiński, this time with the assistance of Józef Niespał. Both aircraft were high performance, 19.0 m (62.3 ft) span, gull wing, wooden single-seat sailplanes but the PWS-102 was different in detail in most areas, with aerodynamic and structural refinements to wings, cockpit, fuselage and horizontal tail. It was also equipped with camber-changing flaps. Its design was begun in 1937 but the aircraft was not ready for flight until the spring of 1939.

The gull wings of the PWS-102 were high-mounted, with less (5°) inner dihedral than on its predecessor and tapering outwards in both chord and thickness out to fine elliptical tips. They were built around a main and an auxiliary spar, the latter to the rear and carrying ailerons and flaps. The wings were entirely ply-covered but ailerons and flaps were fabric-covered. These surfaces occupied essentially all the trailing edge of each wing, with a pair of differential ailerons outboard and a camber-changing flap inboard. DFS type airbrakes, larger than those of the PWS-101, were mounted on the main spar at about one-third span.

The plywood semi-monocoque fuselage had an elliptical section and was more slender than that of the PWS-101. The cockpit was ahead of the wings, where the ply structure ended at half-height and the upper part was covered by smoothly curved, multi-part glazing which reached from nose to wing leading edge. The vertical tail was very similar to that of the PWS-101, with a curved fin and broad rudder but the horizontal tail had a new, elliptical plan, with the hinge between tailplane and split elevators lying on the major axis. Like the wings, fixed tail surfaces were ply-covered and control surfaces fabric-covered. As on the earlier design, the trailing edges of the latter were ahead of the rudder hinge and the elevators were assisted by inboard Flettner tabs.

The PWS-102 had a conventional sprung skid for landing but took off on a two-wheel trolley which was immediately discarded.

== Operational history ==
After its first flight in March 1939 and some small modifications made during an uncompleted development programme, the PWS-102 competed in the ISTUS International Glider Contest held in Lwów in May. It was placed fifth. One production model was completed and flew before the outbreak of World War II, with a second under construction. All three airframes were taken by the U.S.S.R. in late September during the Soviet invasion of northern Poland.

== Specifications ==
Data from J. Cynk (1971) except were noted

General characteristics

- Crew: One
- Length: 7.32 m (24 ft 0 in)
- Wingspan: 19.00 m (62 ft 4 in)
- Wing area: 19.3 m^{2} (208 sq ft)
- Aspect ratio: 18.7
- Empty weight: 260 kg (573 lb)
- Gross weight: 350 kg (772 lb)

Performance

- Never exceed speed: 300 km/h (190 mph, 160 kn)
- Maximum glide ratio: 28.7 at 76 km/h (47 mph; 41 kn)
- Rate of sink: 0.65 m/s (128 ft/min) at 58 km/h (36 mph; 31 kn)
- Minimum speed: 42 km/h (26 mph; 23 kn)

== See also ==
- List of gliders
