= Avro Tutor =

1929 trainer aircraft family

Avro 621 Tutor
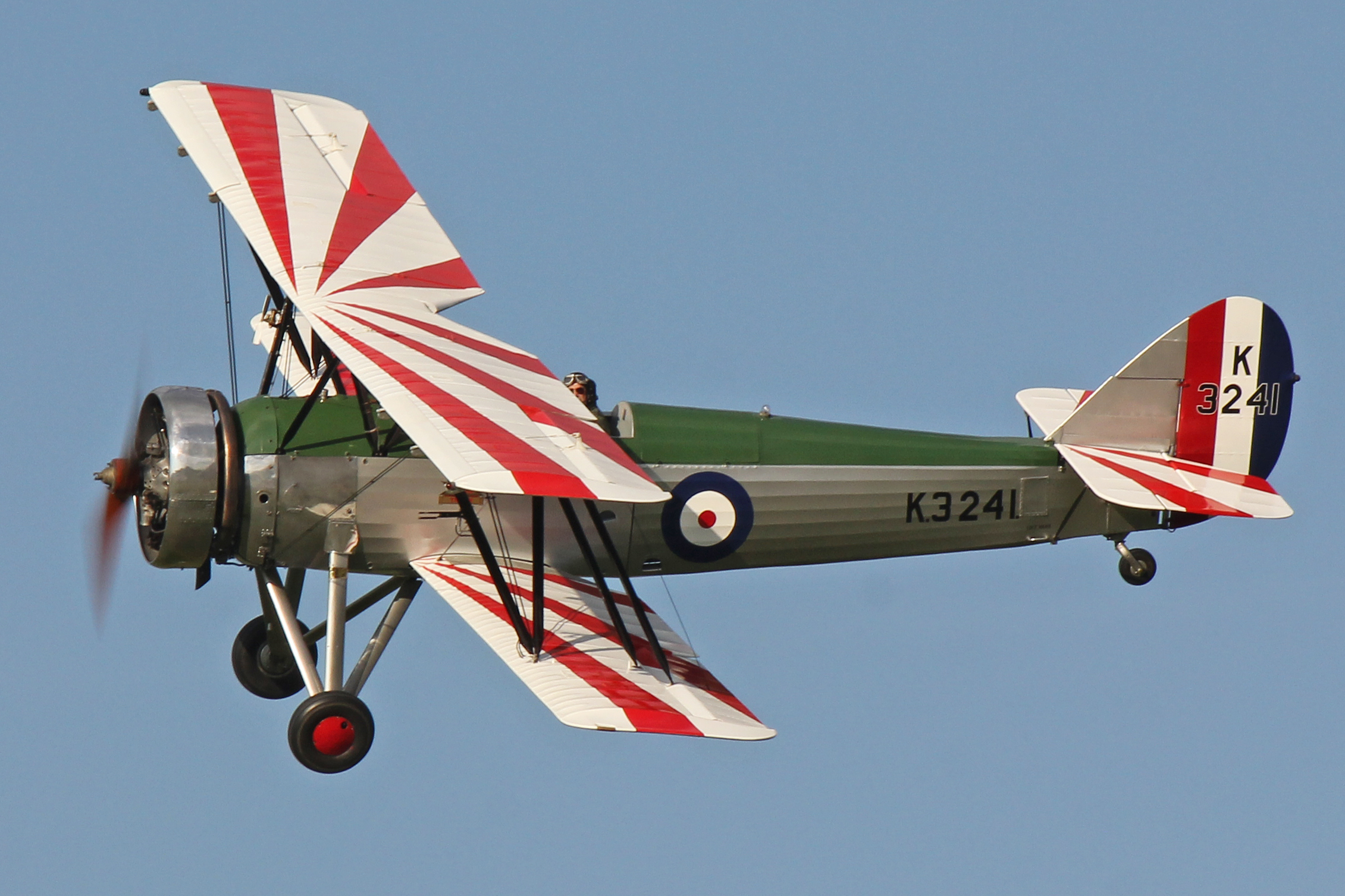
- Avro Type 621 Tutor of the Shuttleworth Collection

General information
- Type: Trainer
- National origin: United Kingdom
- Manufacturer: Avro
- Designer: Roy Chadwick
- Primary user: Royal Air Force
- Number built: 606

History
- Introduction date: 1933
- First flight: September 1929
- Retired: 1941
- Variants: Avro 626, PWS-18

The Avro Type 621 Tutor is a two-seat British radial-engined biplane from the interwar period. It was a simple but rugged basic trainer that was used by the Royal Air Force as well as many other air arms worldwide.

== Design and development ==
The Avro Model 621 was designed by Roy Chadwick as an Avro private venture metal replacement for the Avro 504. Conceived as a light initial pilot trainer, the biplane design featured heavily staggered equal-span, single-bay wings; the construction was based on steel tubing (with some wooden components in the wing ribs) with doped linen covering. A conventional, fixed divided main undercarriage with tailskid was used in all but the latest aircraft, which had a tailwheel.

The Model 621 was powered either by a 155 hp (116 kW) Armstrong Siddeley Mongoose or Armstrong Siddeley Lynx IV (180 hp/130 kW) or IVC (240 hp/179 kW) engine; later Lynx-powered models had the engine enclosed in a Townend ring cowling. The Mongoose-powered version was called the 621 Trainer and the more numerous Lynx-engined aircraft the Tutor. The Tutor also differed by having a more rounded rudder.

The first flight of the prototype G-AAKT was in September 1929, piloted by Avro chief test pilot Captain Harry Albert "Sam" Brown.

== Operational history ==
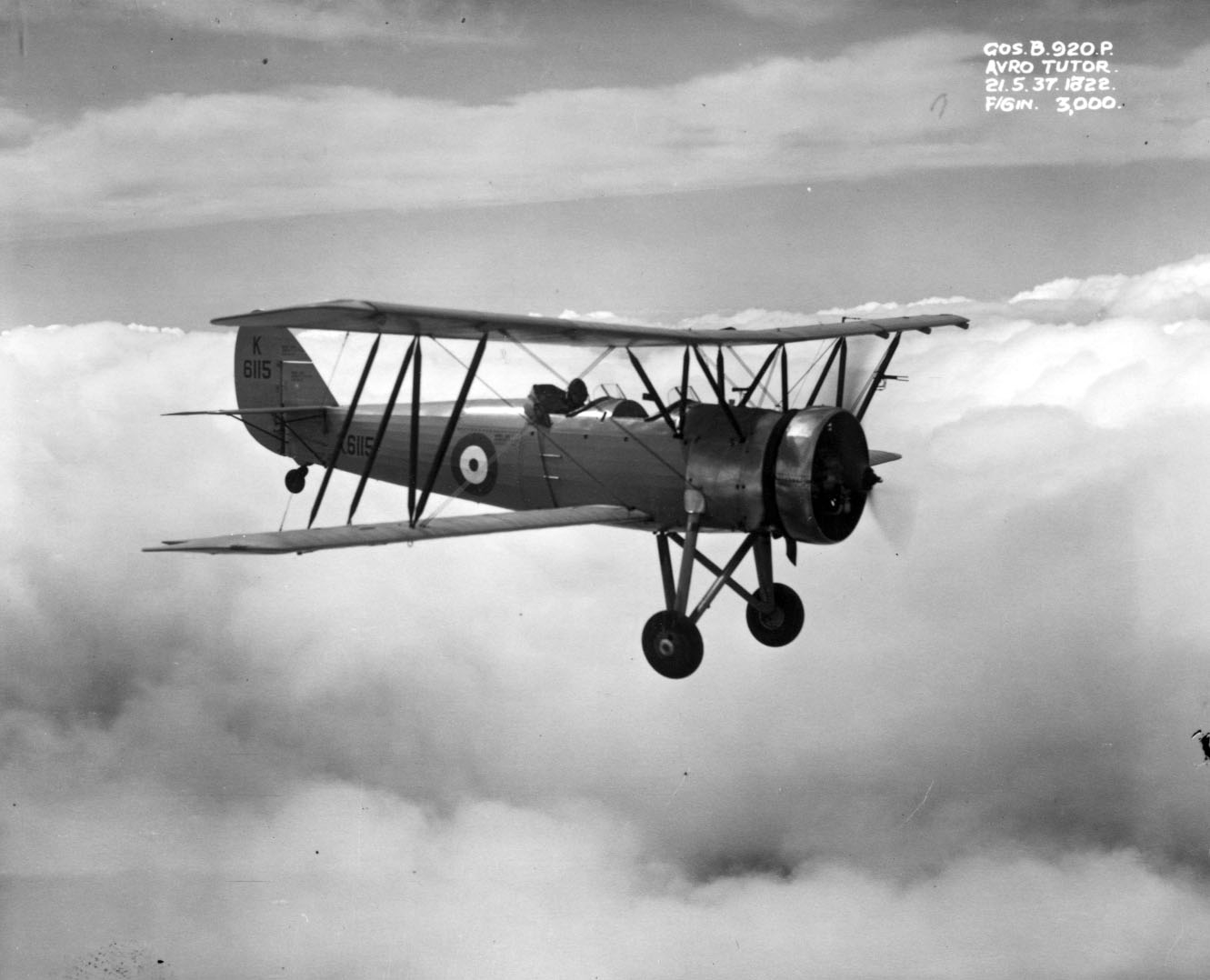
Avro Tutor, 1937

Production was started against an order for three Tutors from the Irish Free State and 21 Trainers from the Royal Air Force. The RAF required a replacement for the wooden Avro 504, and after three years of trials against other machines such as the Hawker Tomtit it was adopted as their basic trainer, supplanting the 504 in 1933 and remaining in this role until 1939. As well as the first batch of 21 Trainers, a total of 381 Tutors and 15 Avro 646 Sea Tutors were eventually ordered by the RAF. RAF units to operate the type in quantity included the Royal Air Force College, the Central Flying School and Nos. 2, 3, 4 and 5 Flying Training Schools.

Subsequently, the Model 621 achieved substantial foreign sales. A.V. Roe and Co exported 29 for the Greek Air Force, six for the Royal Canadian Air Force, five for the Guangxi AF, three for the Irish AF (where it was known as the Triton) and two for each of the South African and Polish AFs. In addition 57 were licence-built in South Africa, and three licence-built by the Danish Naval Shipyard.

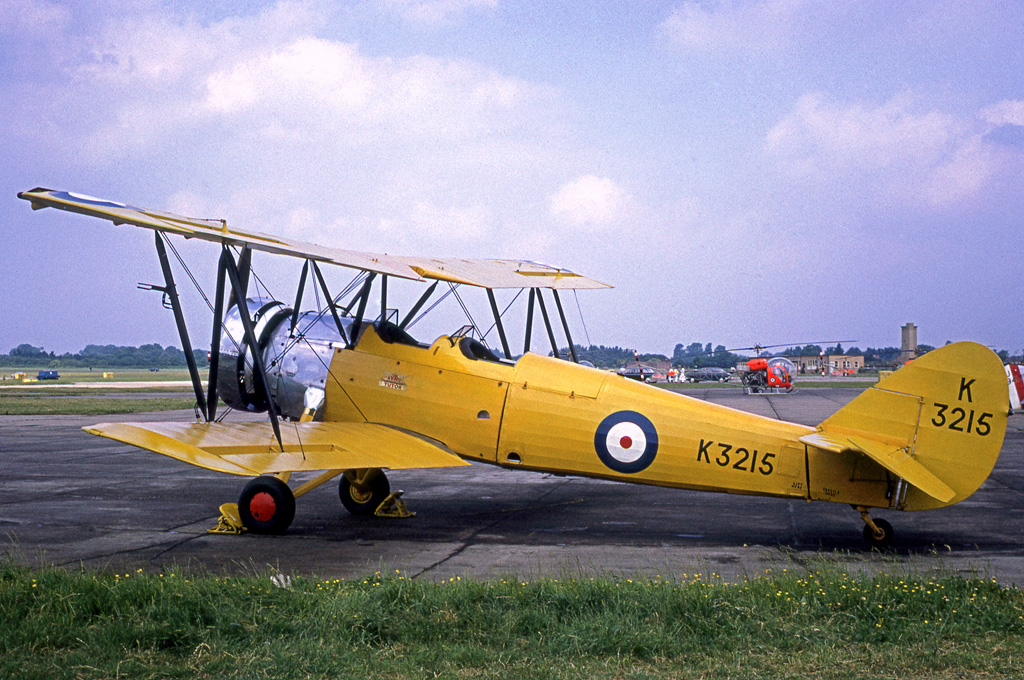
The sole surviving Tutor wearing the 1930s yellow training colour scheme at RAF Abingdon in 1968

A total of 30 Tutors were exported to the Greek Air Force and at least 61 were licence-built in Greece by KEA. A number of Greek Tutors was incorporated in combat squadrons after Greece's entrance in WWII, used as army cooperation aircraft.

Known for its good handling, the type was often featured at air shows. Over 200 Avro Tutors and five Sea Tutors remained in RAF service at the beginning of the Second World War.

The 621 was designed as a military trainer and few reached the civil registers. In the 1930s, in addition to ten prototypes and demonstrators, two were used by Alan Cobham's Flying Circus and two trainers were retired from the RAF into private use. One 621 was used from new by Australian National Airways. After the war another four ex-RAF 621s appeared on the civil register.

== Variants ==
Avro 621 Trainer (Mongoose powered)
Two-seat primary training aircraft.
Avro 621 Tutor (Lynx powered)
Two-seat primary training aircraft.
Avro 621 Tutor II
One aircraft was modified into a two-bay biplane.
Avro 623
Three-seat version of the Type 621 Tutor upgraded for use in Tanganyika as aerial survey aircraft. Three were built between May and December 1930 and issued to the Director of Surveys of Tanganyika. Powered by a 240 hp Armstrong-Siddeley Lynx IV.
Avro 646 Sea Tutor
Two-seat seaplane fitted with twin floats, 15 built

PWS-18
Polish-built licence version with 200 hp (150 kW) Wright J-5 engine. 40 built 1935–36. Still in service with Polish Air Force in 1939.

== Operators ==
Czechoslovakia

- Czechoslovak Air Force pilots operated at least one aircraft in 310 Fighter Squadron RAF.

Denmark

- Royal Danish Navy operated five aircraft.

Canada

- Royal Canadian Air Force operated six aircraft.

China

- Chinese Nationalist Air Force (Kwangsi Airforce) operated five aircraft.

Iraq

- Iraqi Air Force operated three aircraft.

Ireland

- Irish Air Corps operated three aircraft.

Greece

- Hellenic Air Force operated about 90 aircraft.

Poland

- Polish Air Force received two aircraft from Avro, plus 40 from PWS.

South Africa

- South African Air Force operated 60 aircraft.

United Kingdom

- Royal Air Force received 417 aircraft.
- Royal Navy Fleet Air Arm

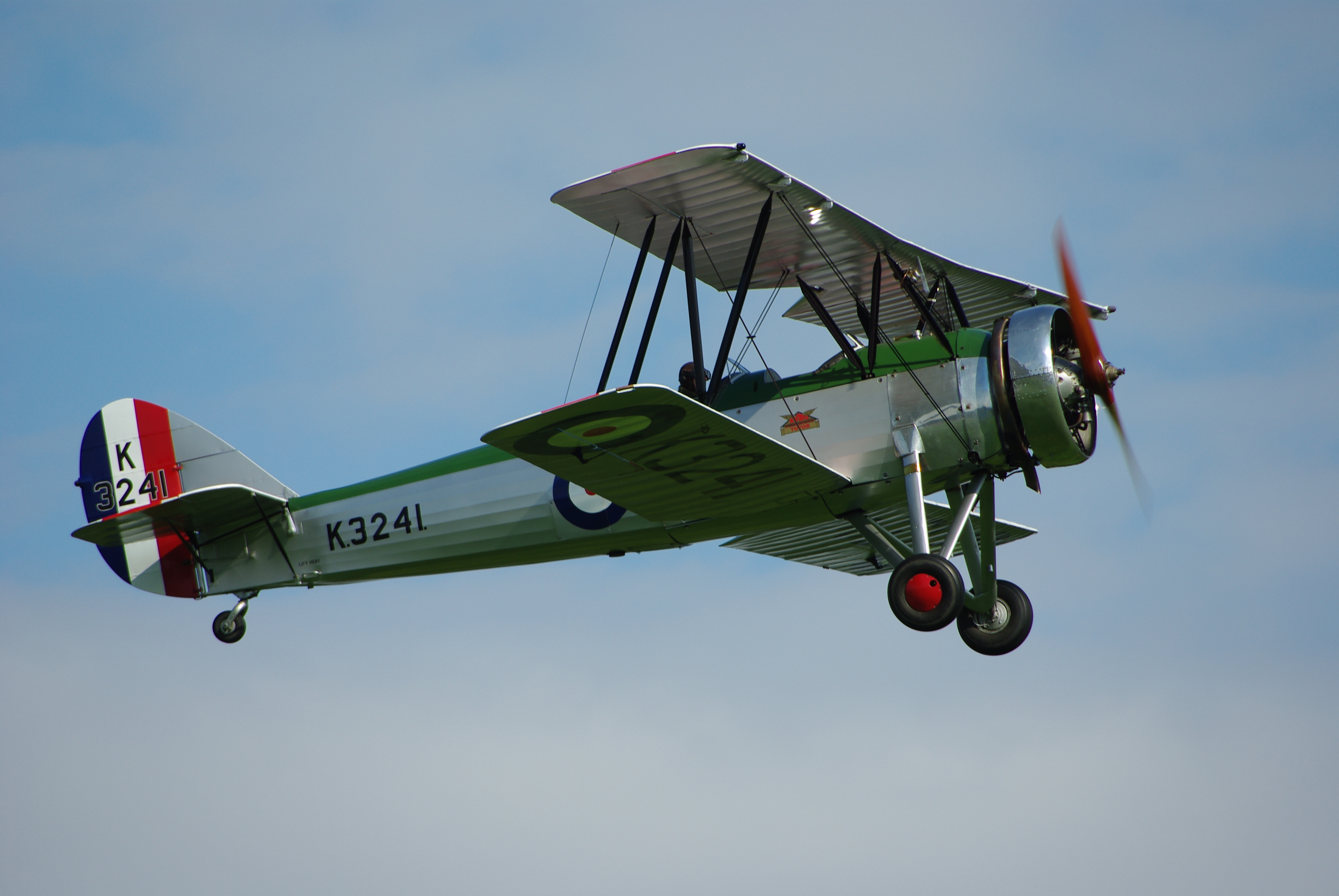
The Shuttleworth Collection's Avro Tutor K3215/G-AHSA

== Surviving aircraft ==
G-AHSA was used for communication duties during the Second World War, struck off December 1946 and purchased by Wing Commander Heywood. After suffering engine failure in the early stages of the filming of Reach for the Sky, it was purchased by the Shuttleworth Collection and restored to flying condition.

Up to the end of 2003, G-AHSA was still flying as K3215 in RAF trainer yellow. Since January 2004 it has flown painted as K3241 in the colours of the Central Flying School. (The real K3241 built in 1933, served RAF College Cranwell, until transferred to the CFA in 1936.)

== Specifications (Tutor) ==
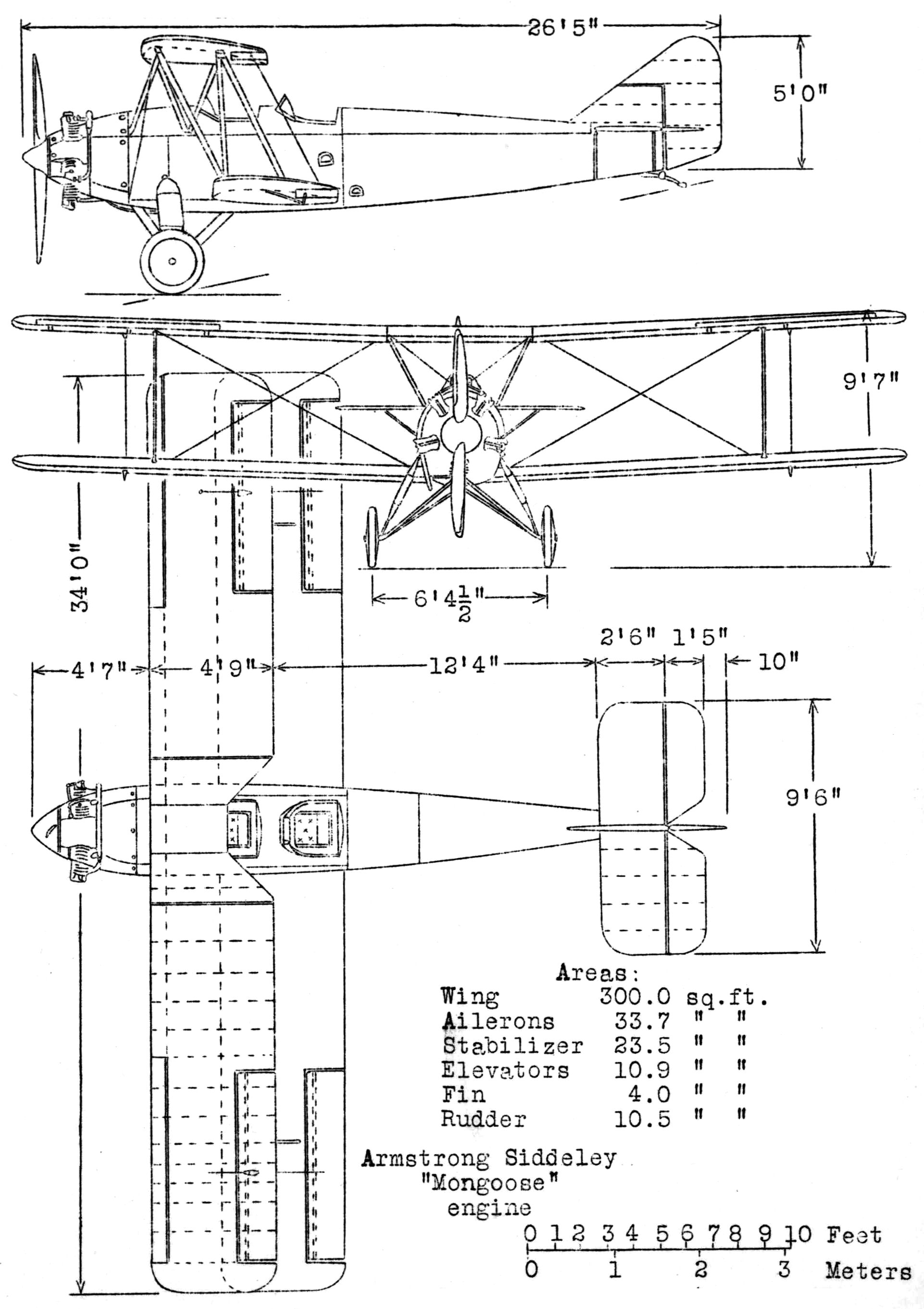
Avro 621 Trainer 3-view drawing from NACA Aircraft Circular No.119

Data from Avro Aircraft since 1908

General characteristics

- Crew: 2
- Length: 26 ft 4.5 in (8.039 m)
- Wingspan: 34 ft 0 in (10.36 m)
- Height: 9 ft 7 in (2.92 m)
- Wing area: 301 sq ft (28.0 m^{2})
- Empty weight: 1,844 lb (836 kg)
- Gross weight: 2,493 lb (1,131 kg)
- Powerplant: 1 × Armstrong Siddeley Lynx IVC 7-cylinder air-cooled radial piston engine, 240 hp (180 kW)
- Propellers: 2-bladed fixed-pitch propeller

Performance

- Maximum speed: 120 mph (190 km/h, 100 kn)
- Cruise speed: 97 mph (156 km/h, 84 kn)
- Range: 250 mi (400 km, 220 nmi)
- Service ceiling: 16,000 ft (4,900 m)
- Rate of climb: 910 ft/min (4.6 m/s)

== See also ==
Related development

- Avro 626
- Avro 637
- Avro 643 Cadet
- Avro Prefect
- PWS-18

Aircraft of comparable role, configuration, and era

- Bücker Bü 131 Jungmann
- Bücker Bü 181 Bestmann
- Repülőgépgyár Levente II
- de Havilland Tiger Moth
- Hawker Tomtit
- PWS-26

Related lists

- List of aircraft of the Royal Air Force
