= PWS-101 =

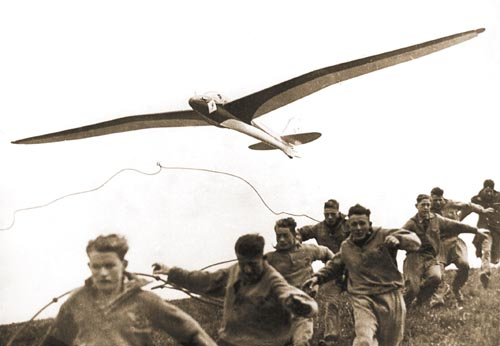
- Tadeusz Góra taking a bungee launch on his PWS-101.

General information
- Type: High performance sailplane
- National origin: Poland
- Manufacturer: PWS
- Designer: Wacław Czerwiński
- Number built: 12

History
- First flight: Spring 1937

The PWS-101 was a high performance Polish glider first flown in 1937. One made the longest distance glider flight in Europe in 1938, gathering prizes for aircraft and pilot.

== Design and development ==
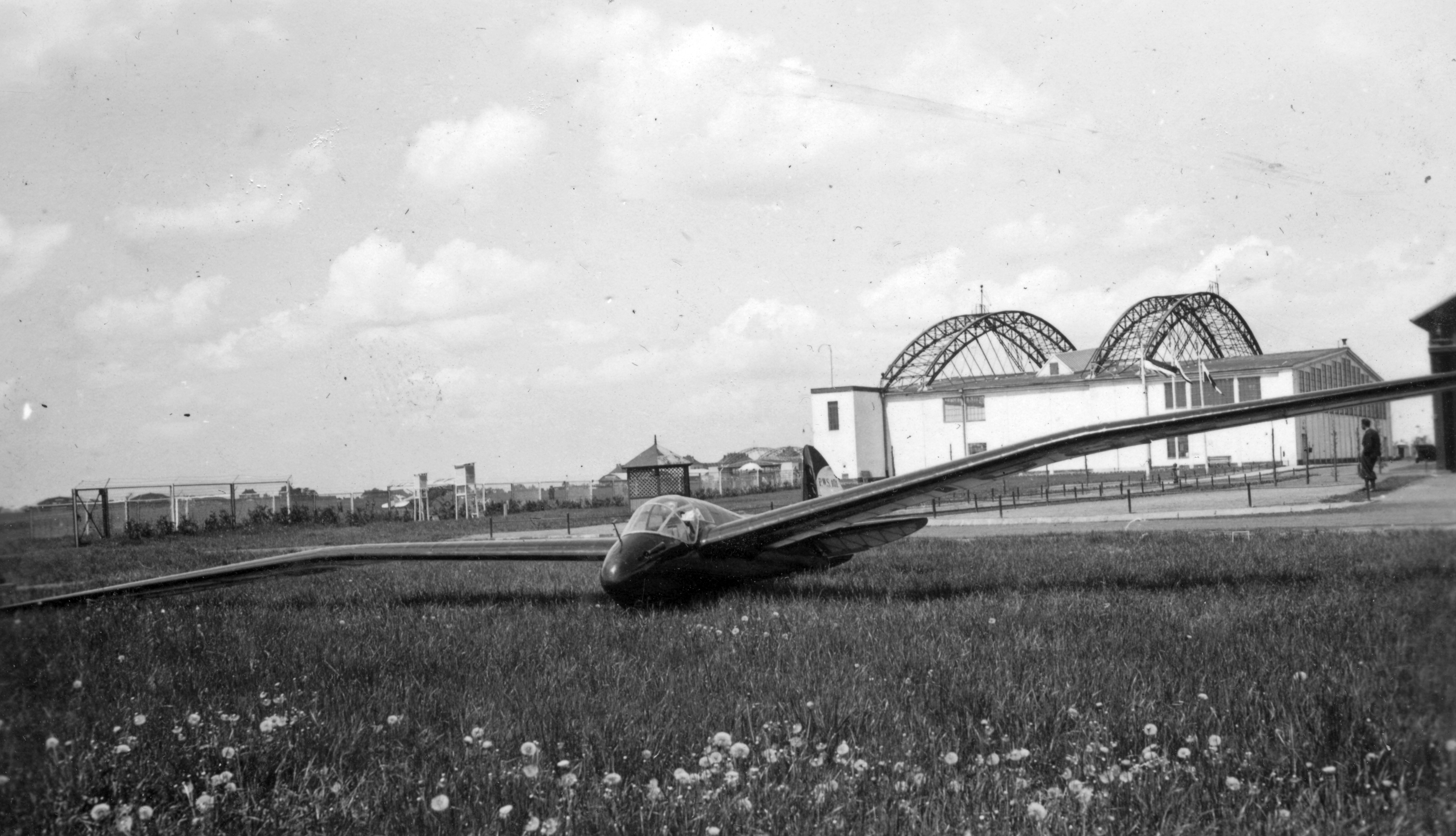
Forward view

Podlaska Wytwórnia Samolotów, generally known by its initials PWS, expanded into glider design and manufacture in 1936. Their first example, the PWS 101, was designed by Wacław Czerwiński who was a specialist glider designer, most recently of the 1934 CW 7 and CW 8. The PWS 101 was flown for the first time in the spring of 1937.

The single-seat PWS-101 was an all wood sailplane with a high aspect ratio, mid-mounted, gull wing. The inner 40% part of the span had a dihedral of about 8° but the remainder had little. In plan the wings were straight-tapered, mostly on the trailing edge. Its two parts were each built around a single spar which formed the rear of a plywood D-box including the leading edge. The innermost 25% of the span was further reinforced with ply covering and the rest of the surface was fabric-covered. Divided ailerons occupied more than half the trailing edges. A DFS type air brake, mounted on the spar at about one-third span, could be extended both above and below the wing.

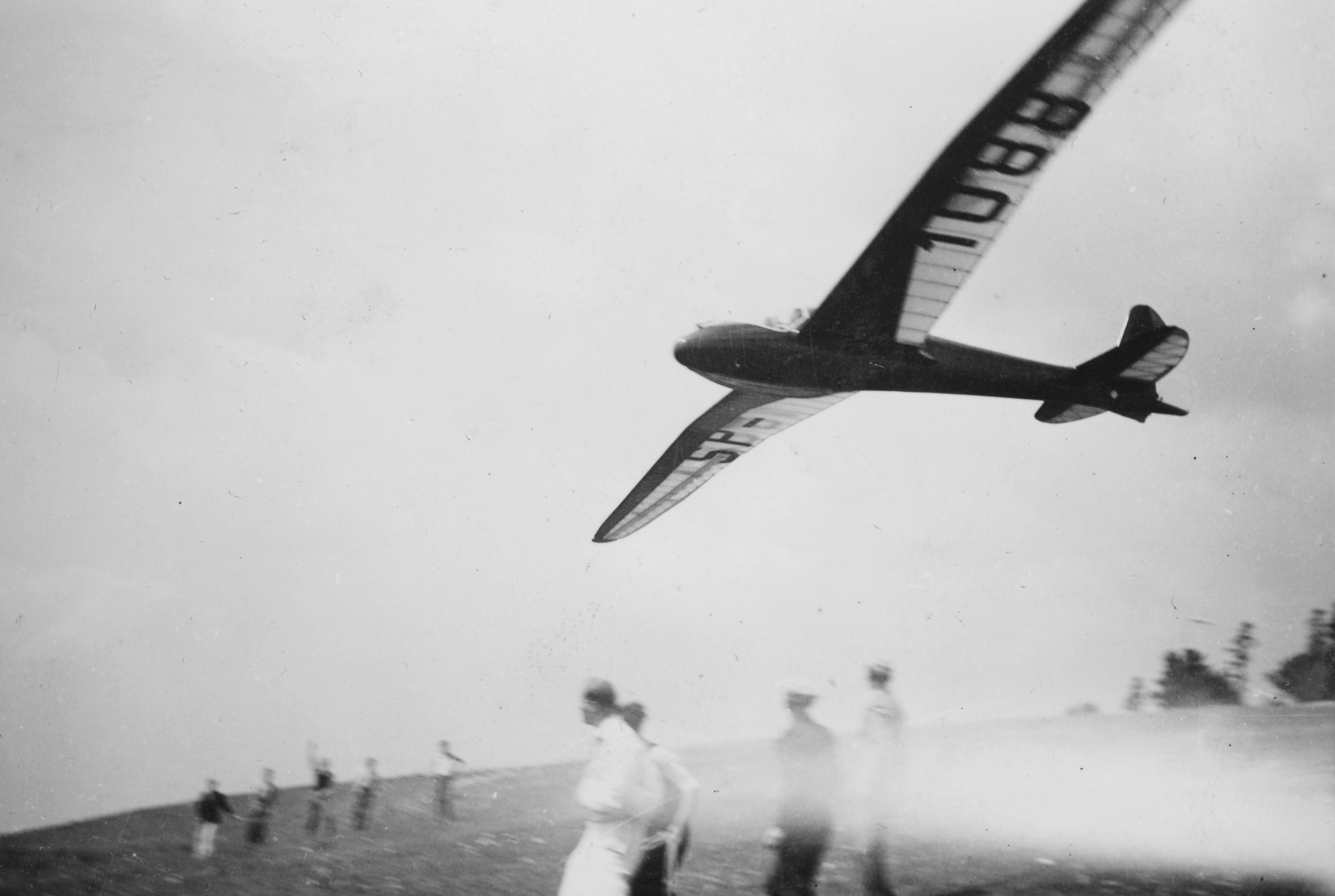
SP-1088 just after a bungee launch

Its fuselage was a ply-covered, oval section semi-monocoque structure with an enclosed, multi-transparency cockpit above the leading edges of the wing roots. Some of the production PWS-101s had 40 L (1.4 cu ft) water ballast tanks. The fuselage tapered smoothly aft to a conventional empennage with a straight-tapered tailplane mounted on top and a curved fin, both ply-covered. The control surfaces were fabric-covered; the rudder was large and rounded and the elevators were semi-elliptical and assisted with inboard Flettner tabs. The PWS-101 landed on a sprung skid.

== Operational history ==
After completing its flight trials In the early summer of 1937 two PWS-101s joined a Polish team competing at the annual Rhön glider international contest, held in July on the Wasserkuppe. The Germans judged the PWS-101 the best foreign aircraft present and one set a new Polish distance record of 351 km (218 mi; 190 nmi) but they only achieved 10th and 20th places.

Production began shortly after the contest, with two series of five completed before the German invasion in September 1939. They did well in the national contests of 1937 and 1938 and two came first and second in the ISTUS International Contest held in Lwów in May 1939. An outstanding flight between Bezmiechowa to Wilno, piloted by Tadeusz Góra in May 1938, set a new Polish record of 577.8 km (359.0 mi; 312.0 nmi) and was the greatest distance flown by a glider in Europe that year. It was named by the FAI as the supreme glider achievement of 1938 and Góra became the first recipient of the Lilienthal Medal. A PWS-101 was exhibited at the 1938 Paris Salon.

== Specifications ==
Data from J. Cynk (1971) except where noted.

General characteristics

- Crew: One
- Length: 7.27 m (23 ft 10 in)
- Wingspan: 19.0 m (62 ft 4 in)
- Height: 1.77 m (5 ft 10 in)
- Wing area: 19.4 m^{2} (209 sq ft)
- Aspect ratio: 18.6
- Airfoil: Göttingen 549 and two thinner variants
- Empty weight: 184 kg (406 lb) or 271 kg (597 lb)
- Gross weight: 265 kg (584 lb) or 305 kg (672 lb)
- Max takeoff weight: 312 kg (688 lb) or 355 kg (783 lb)

Performance

- Never exceed speed: 200 km/h (120 mph, 110 kn) in dive.
- Maximum glide ratio: 26.1 at 61 mph (98 km/h; 53 kn) optimum
- Rate of sink: 0.61 m/s (120 ft/min) at 55 mph (89 km/h; 48 kn) minimum
- minimum speed:48.5 mph (78.1 km/h; 42.1 kn)

== See also ==
- List of gliders
