= PWS-50 =

1930s Polish light aircraft

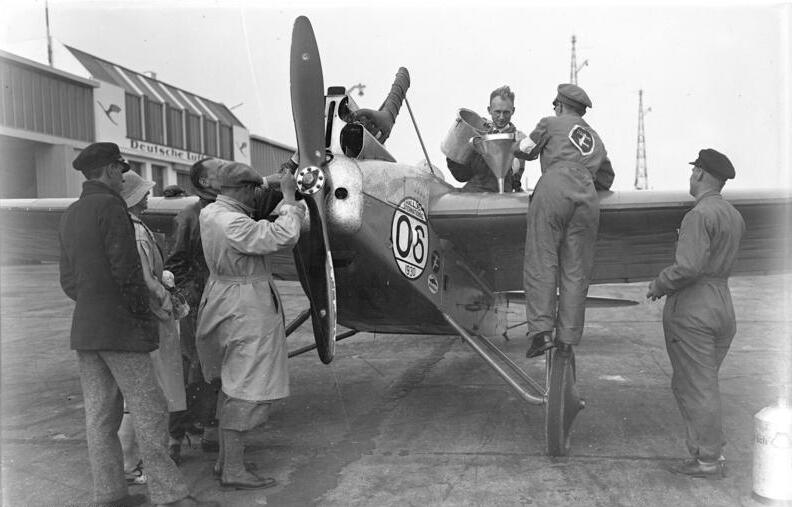
- PWS-50 of Z. Babiński during the Challenge 1930

General information
- Type: Sports plane
- Manufacturer: Podlaska Wytwórnia Samolotów
- Number built: 1

History
- First flight: 1930
- Retired: 1933

The PWS-50,(PWS - Podlaska Wytwórnia Samolotów - Podlasie Aircraft Factory), was a prototype Polish single-engine mid-wing monoplane sports aircraft of 1930, constructed by Podlaska Wytwórnia Samolotów.

== Design and development ==
The aircraft was designed in 1929 in Podlaska Wytwórnia Samolotów, on factory's initiative, specially to participate in the Challenge International de Tourisme 1930 international touring aircraft contest. A preliminary design was made by Major Wacław Makowski, a construction sketches by Augustyn Bobek-Zdaniewski. The plane was built and first flown in spring of 1930 by Franciszek Rutkowski in Biała Podlaska.

== Operational history ==
The prototype, with markings SP-ADB, took part in the Challenge 1930 international contest in July 1930, flown by Zbigniew Babiński. He was disqualified for time infringement, but completed the rally off the contest.

Later the plane was used for a short time by an Aviation Club of the PWS factory. It took part in some competitions in Poland, without much success, only in June 1933 J. Szałowski won the 3rd place in PWS-50 in the 1st Flight of North-Western Poland. During a contest in autumn 1930 the plane was damaged and later repaired. In 1932 the plane received a name "Podlasianka" (a female of Podlasie region). In late June 1933 the plane was damaged in a crash in Warsaw, and then was broken up.

== Description ==
It was a single-engine cantilever mid-wing monoplane, of a wooden construction. A fuselage was rectangular in cross-section, covered with plywood. Trapezoid single-section wings with rounded tips, two-spar, plywood and canvas covered. Crew of two, sitting side-by-side between spars, in an open cockpit, fitted with a windshield and dual controls. A luggage compartment was behind the cockpit. The plane had a fixed conventional landing gear, with a rear skid. The Flight described the PWS-50 as: the view appeared very good and the construction sound.

The engine was 4-cylinder air-cooled straight Cirrus III in front, 85 hp nominal power and 94 hp take-off power. Two-blade wooden propeller of a fixed pitch. A fuel tank behind a cockpit had a capacity 100 L and could be dropped in emergency. Fuel consumption was 26 L/hour.

== Specifications ==
Data from Jane's all the World's Aircraft 1931, Poser - PWS - Podlaska Wytwórnia Samolotów : PWS-50

General characteristics

- Crew: 2
- Length: 7.1 m (23 ft 4 in)
- Wingspan: 11 m (36 ft 1 in)
- Height: 2.1 m (6 ft 11 in)
- Wing area: 20 m^{2} (220 sq ft)
- Empty weight: 429 kg (946 lb)
- Gross weight: 650 kg (1,433 lb)
- Fuel capacity: 100 L (26 US gal; 22 imp gal)
- Powerplant: 1 × ADC Cirrus III 4-cylinder air-cooled in-line piston engine, 63 kW (85 hp) to 71 kW (95 hp)
- Propellers: 2-bladed fixed-pitch propeller

Performance

- Maximum speed: 155 km/h (96 mph, 84 kn)
- Stall speed: 60 km/h (37 mph, 32 kn)
- Range: 500 km (310 mi, 270 nmi)
- Service ceiling: 3,400 m (11,200 ft)
- Rate of climb: 2.8 m/s (550 ft/min)
- Time to altitude: 1,000 m (3,300 ft) in 8 minutes
- Wing loading: 31 kg/m^{2} (6.3 lb/sq ft)
- Power/mass: 0.10069 kW/kg (0.06125 hp/lb)
