= Jerzy Kotula =

Polish bookseller and publisher

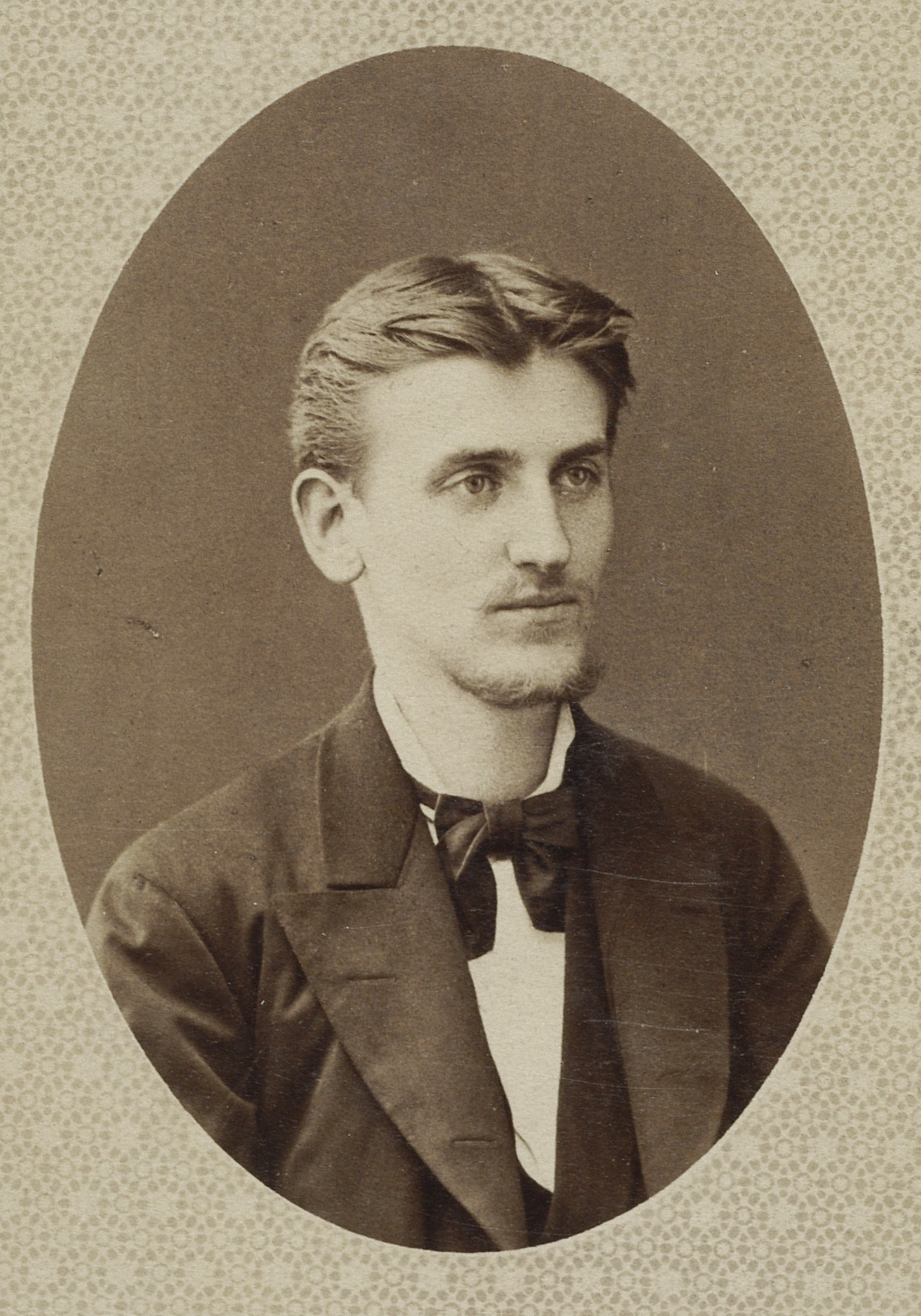
- Jerzy Kotula in 1876
- Born: 1855; Šahy
- Died: 29 July 1889 (aged 33–34); Cieszyn
- Occupation(s): bookseller, publisher
- Father: Andrzej Kotula

Jerzy Kotula (1855 – 29 July 1889) was a Polish bookseller and publisher.

He was a son of Andrzej Kotula. From the 1870s, he worked as an assistant bookseller in Cieszyn, and in 1883, he opened his own bookstore. Since 1879, he had been involved in publishing, releasing, among others, a brochure by Józef Ignacy Kraszewski titled W sprawie szkół ludowych na Śląsku (On the Matter of Folk Schools in Silesia). He also worked on Polish bibliographies in Slovanským katalogu bibliografickým and collaborated with the editorial team of the Geographical Dictionary of the Kingdom of Poland. He was a member of the Educational Society for the Duchy of Cieszyn and an activist of the Evangelical Society for Folk Education.

== Origins and childhood ==
Jerzy Kotula was born in 1855 in Šahy. He came from a family that settled in the Cieszyn Silesia in the 16th century as part of the so-called Vlach colonization. He was part of the "millers' line" of the Kotula family, originating from Paweł Kotula (died 1732), a miller in Hradiště. Jerzy's grandfather, Józef Kotula (died 1844), owned land no. 59 in the same village.

Jerzy was the fourth child of Andrzej Kotula, a Polish notary and national activist in Cieszyn Silesia, and his wife Anna Zuzanna from the Tetl family. He had siblings: Bolesław, Ludmiła Anna, Ludomir, and Rudolf. He also had a half-sister, Emilia, from his mother's first marriage.

He was born in Hungary, where his father worked as a land registry clerk. Later, the Kotula family returned to Cieszyn, where Jerzy began attending the local Evangelical gymnasium in 1867. He studied there until 1869 or 1870. It is unknown where he continued his education afterward, though it is believed that he studied outside Cieszyn.

== Early career ==
Around 1875, Jerzy Kotula became an assistant at Karol Malik's bookstore (the first Polish bookstore in Cieszyn Silesia).

He began his public activities in the second half of the 1870s. From 26 to 28 January 1878, he organized an exhibition of Polish periodicals in the People's Reading Room in Cieszyn, which had been published in the previous year in Poland and among the Polish diaspora in America. Gwiazdka Cieszyńska described the exhibition as interesting and instructive, with 110 people visiting it.

During this time, he began collaborating with the Slovanský katalog bibliografický and compiled a section on Polish bibliography for the years 1877, 1878, and 1880. The first two lists were positively evaluated by Józef Ignacy Kraszewski, while the third was criticized, with Kraków bibliographers accusing Kotula of plagiarism. Afterward, Kotula no longer compiled Polish bibliographies for the catalog, possibly due to financial reasons, as Polonica brought little profit to publishers. Kotula also cooperated with the Geographical Dictionary of the Kingdom of Poland.

In 1879, he began his publishing activities. He first published Dzieje francuskiego piśmiennictwa od początku aż do nowych czasów (The History of French Literature from the Beginning to Modern Times) by Feliks Kozubowski, followed by O czystości obyczajów (On the Purity of Morals) by Sylvester Graham, translated and with a preface by Kozubowski, as well as Przewodnik w wyborze książek dla młodzieży szkolnej (Guide in Choosing Books for School Youth), also by Kozubowski.

Kotula also approached Józef Ignacy Kraszewski, requesting him to write a pamphlet for teachers. The Cieszyn publisher emphasized that in Austrian Silesia, there were 16 secondary schools for 260,000 Germans, while for 300,000 Poles and Czechs, there were none. He also pointed out that the Duchy of Teschen was entirely Polish. In response, Kraszewski wrote W sprawie szkół ludowych na Śląsku (On the Issue of Folk Schools in Silesia), published in October 1879.

Kotula focused on raising national consciousness among the people of Cieszyn Silesia, which he described as "a corner forgotten for so many centuries, yet here, to this day, so many hearts beat for our common mother". In addition to W sprawie szkół..., he suggested to Kraszewski the idea of writing a series of novels for young people, designed to cultivate "love for things native". These plans, like the idea of writing "poesy" by Władysław Bełza, were never realized. In 1881, he published Niezapominajka, a collection of poems by Jan Kubisz, writing under the pseudonym "Ślązak".

Kotula also tried his hand at history. Starting in June 1881, he collected notes for Notatki do Historyi Śląska (Notes on the History of Silesia), but these were never published.

== Jerzy Kotula as bookstore owner ==
In the second half of 1882, Kotula unsuccessfully applied for a printing press license in Cieszyn from the Regional Government in Opava. In 1883, he bought Eduard August Schroeder's bookstore in Cieszyn and reopened it under his own name on 1 July 1883.

Kotula was a member of the Educational Society for the Duchy of Cieszyn and the Evangelical Society for Folk Education, founded in 1881. He also co-created the journal Przyjaciel Ludu published by the society.

In addition to running his bookstore, Kotula worked as an agent for the Mutual Insurance Society in Kraków starting in 1884.

He fell ill at the beginning of 1889. By April, he had ceased his involvement with Przyjaciel Ludu and in May, resigned from his duties as an insurance agent.

He died in Cieszyn on 29 July 1889. According to his death certificate, the cause was lung paralysis. The suggestion that he committed suicide, although reflected in some literature, is not supported by the available sources. His funeral took place on 31 July.

The debts left by Jerzy Kotula were inherited by his father, Andrzej, while the bookstore was purchased by Siegmund Stuks, a German of Jewish descent.
