= Kontula =

Kontula may refer to:

== Place ==
- Kontula, Helsinki
  - Kontula metro station

== Surname ==
- Anna Kontula (born 1977), Finnish sociologist and member of parliament
- Osmo Kontula (born 1951), Finnish sociologist sexologist
- Pentti Kontula (1930–1987), Finnish Boxer

== See also ==
- Kotula, a surname
