= Těrlicko =

Těrlicko Cierlicko
- Municipality
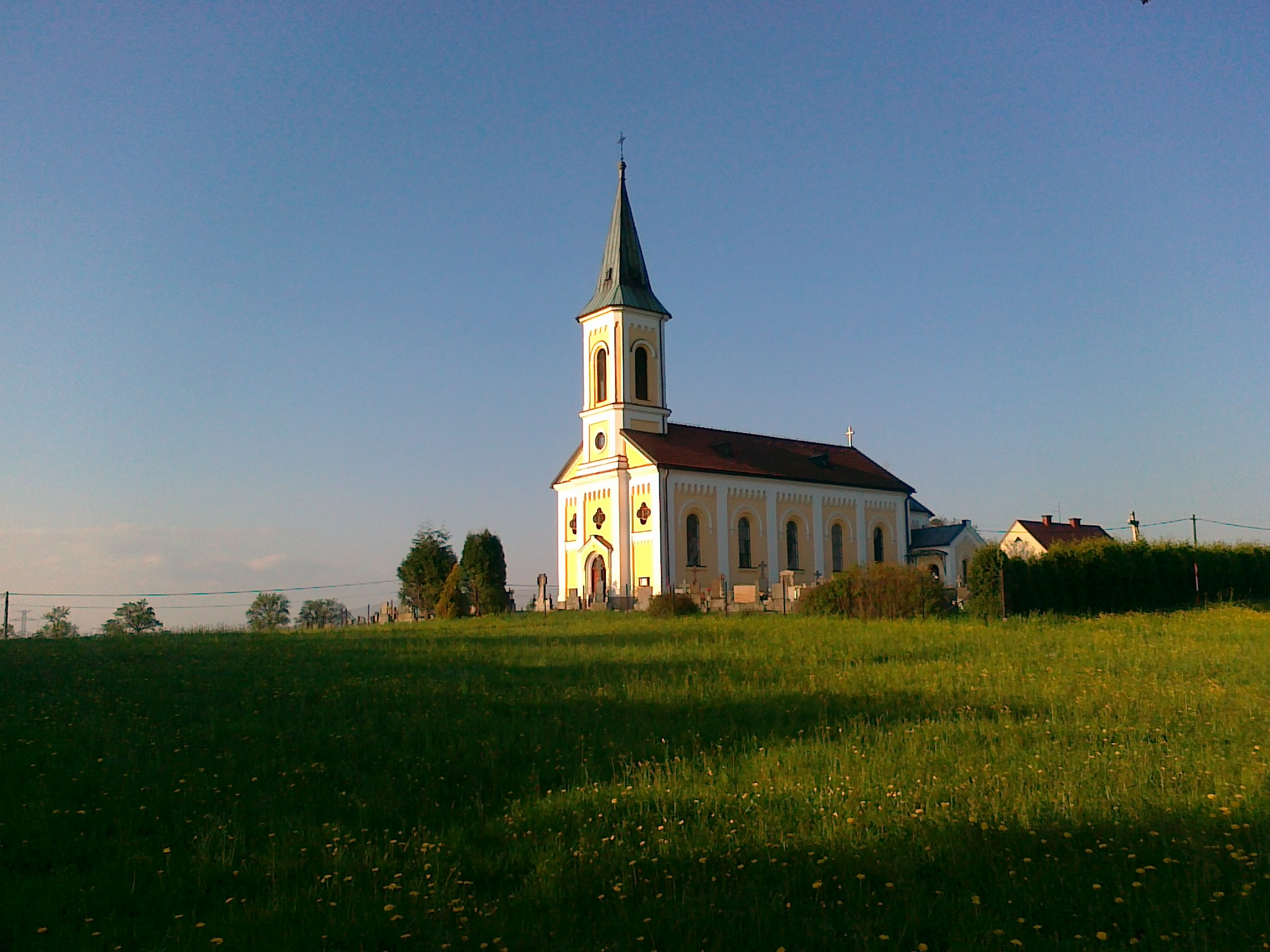
- Church of Saint Lawrence

- Flag Coat of arms

- Location in the Czech Republic
- Coordinates: 49°44′54″N 18°30′1″E
- Country: Czech Republic
- Region: Moravian-Silesian
- District: Karviná
- First mentioned: 1229

Area
  - Total: 24.65 km^{2} (9.52 sq mi)
- Elevation: 260 m (850 ft)

Population (2026-01-01)
  - Total: 4,876
  - Density: 197.8/km^{2} (512.3/sq mi)
- Time zone: UTC+1 (CET)
  - Summer (DST): UTC+2 (CEST)
- Postal code: 735 42
- Website: terlicko.cz

Těrlicko (Czech pronunciation: [ˈcɛrlɪtsko]; Polish: Cierlicko, German: Tierlitzko) is a municipality in Karviná District in the Moravian-Silesian Region of the Czech Republic. It has about 4,900 inhabitants.

== Administrative division ==
Těrlicko consists of three municipal parts (in brackets population according to the 2021 census):

- Dolní Těrlicko (676)
- Horní Těrlicko (2,976)
- Hradiště (994)

== Etymology ==
The name could be derived from the so-called cierlice, which was a tool used to comb flax. Another theory derives the name from Cierla or Cierlava, which were older names of the Stonávka River.

== Geography ==
Těrlicko is located next to Havířov, about 13 kilometres (8 mi) southeast of Ostrava. It lies in the historical region of Cieszyn Silesia, in the western part of the Moravian-Silesian Foothills. The highest point is Babí hora Hill at 423 m (1,388 ft) above sea level.

The municipality is situated on the shores of Těrlicko Reservoir, which was built on the Stonávka River in 1962. It has an area of 227 ha (560 acres).

== History ==
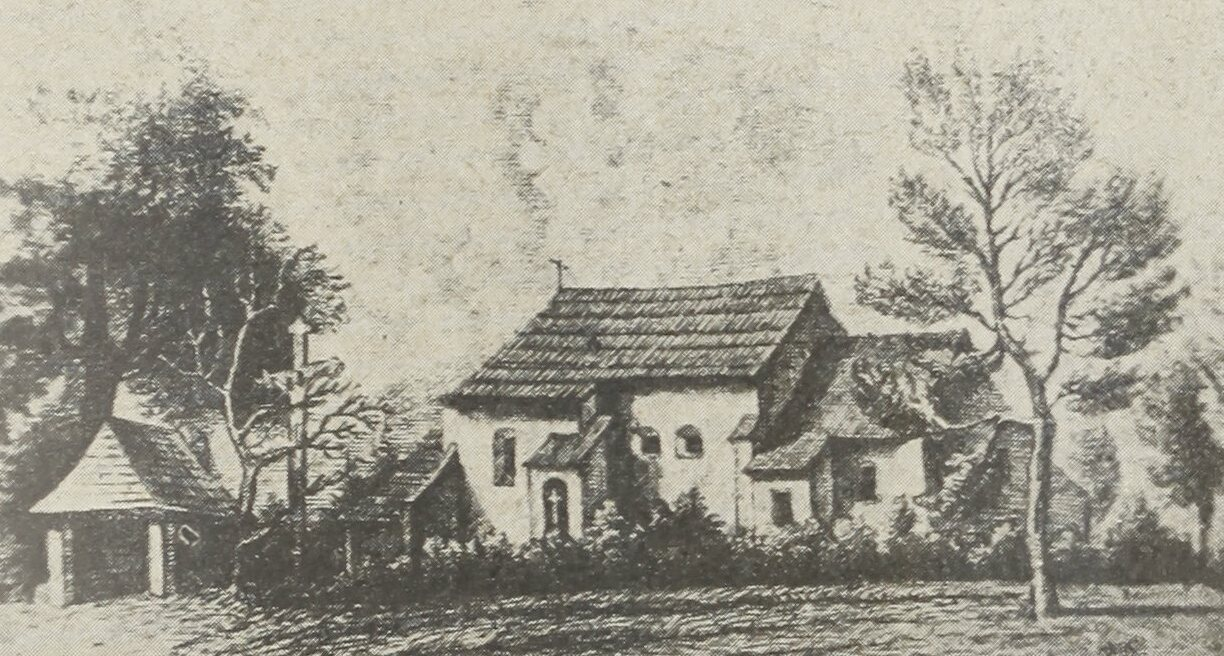
Church of the Holy Trinity before demolition

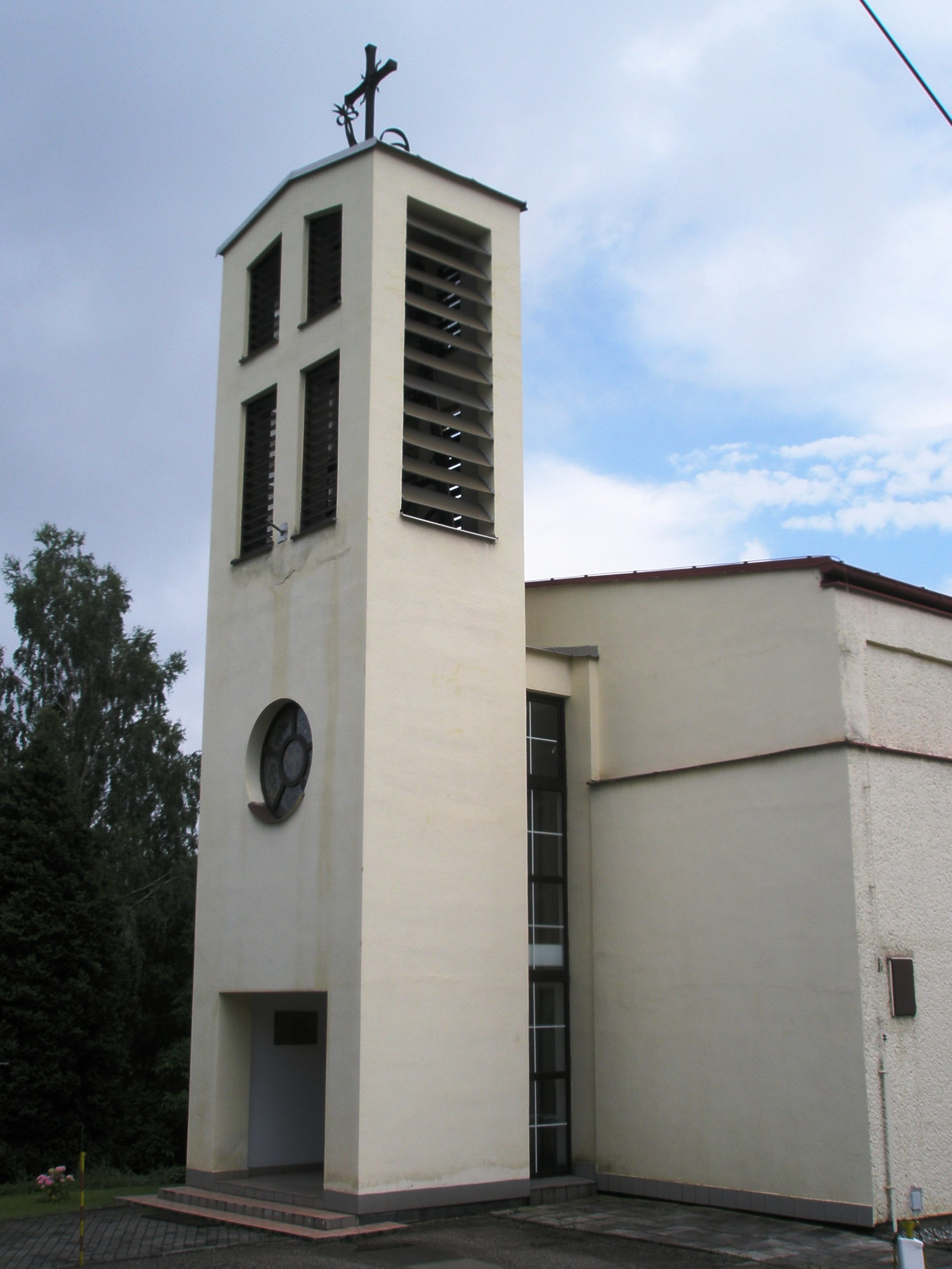
Lutheran church

Těrlicko was first mentioned in the document of Pope Gregory IX issued for Benedictine abbey in Tyniec in 1229 as Cierlitzko. Těrlicko was probably owned by the abbey. The monks brought settlers to the area who were engaged in agriculture, especially flax growing and sheep farming. In 1440, the village became part of the Skoczów estate. In 1447, it was inherited by Przemysław II, Duke of Cieszyn, then the estate often changed owners.

The village probably became a seat of a Catholic parish prior to the 16th century, and also a church in the hamlet of Kostelec was built. After the 1540s Reformation prevailed in the Duchy of Teschen both were taken over by Lutherans. They were taken from them (as two from around fifty buildings) in the region by a special commission and given back to the Roman Catholic Church on 24 March 1654.

At the end of the 16th century the division into two parts developed: Dolní Těrlicko (first mentioned in 1598) and Horní Těrlicko (first mentioned in 1613).

In 1731, the area became the property of the Larisch-Mönnich family, last noble owners. They owned it until 1926, since when it was no longer possible for the nobility to own a municipality.

After Revolutions of 1848 in the Austrian Empire a modern municipal division was introduced in the re-established Austrian Silesia. The villages as two separate municipalities were subscribed to the political and legal district of Cieszyn.

According to the censuses conducted in 1880–1910 the population of Dolní Těrlicko grew from 454 in 1880 to 617 in 1910 with a majority being native Polish-speakers (between 97.2% and 99.1%) accompanied by a few German-speaking persons (at most or 2.5% in 1890). In terms of religion in 1910 majority were Protestants (54.9%), followed by Roman Catholics (45.1%). In Horní Těrlicko the population dropped from 1452 in 1880 to 1390 in 1910 with a majority being native Polish-speakers (between 98.6% and 99.7%) accompanied by a few German-speakers (at most 10 or 0.7% in 1910) and Czech-speakers (at most 9 or 0.7% in 1910). In terms of religion in 1910 the majority were Roman Catholics (66.5%), followed by Lutherans (35.5%).

After World War I, Polish–Czechoslovak War and the division of Cieszyn Silesia in 1920, the area became part of Czechoslovakia. Following the Munich Agreement, in October 1938 together with the Trans-Olza region they were annexed by Poland, administratively adjoined to Cieszyn County of Silesian Voivodeship. They were then annexed by Nazi Germany at the beginning of World War II. After the war it was restored to Czechoslovakia.

In 1953, it was decided to build a reservoir on the Stonávka River. The reservoir was put into operation in 1962. During construction, 141 buildings were flooded, including many community buildings and a church. In 1964 Dolní Těrlicko and Horní Těrlicko were joined and formed the municipality called Těrlicko. Hradiště was joined to the municipality in 1975.

== Demographics ==
According to the 2021 Census, Polish minority makes up 7.4% of the population.

Historical population

Year	Pop.	±%
1869	2,617	—
1880	2,749	+5.0%
1890	2,595	−5.6%
1900	2,551	−1.7%
1910	2,792	+9.4%

Year	Pop.	±%
1921	2,835	+1.5%
1930	3,063	+8.0%
1950	3,022	−1.3%
1961	3,011	−0.4%
1970	3,385	+12.4%

Year	Pop.	±%
1980	3,714	+9.7%
1991	3,874	+4.3%
2001	4,126	+6.5%
2011	4,243	+2.8%
2021	4,646	+9.5%

Source: Censuses

== Economy ==
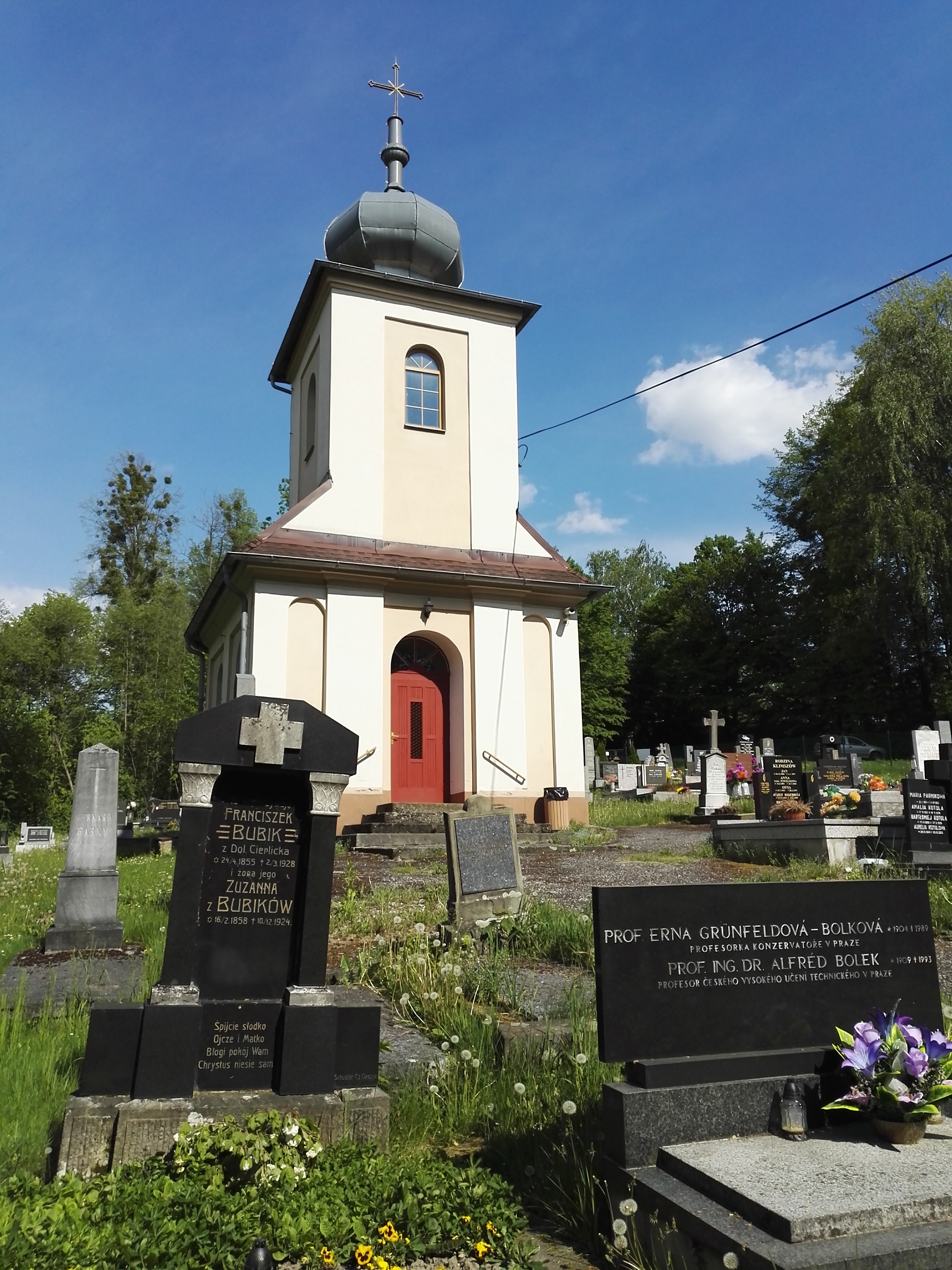
Lutheran cemetery

After the reservoir was built, Těrlicko gradually became a centre of tourism. Public beaches, recreational facilities and private cottages have been set up here.

== Transport ==
The I/11 road (the section from Havířov to Český Těšín) runs through the municipality.

== Sport ==
The reservoir is a popular spot for water sports.

== Sights ==
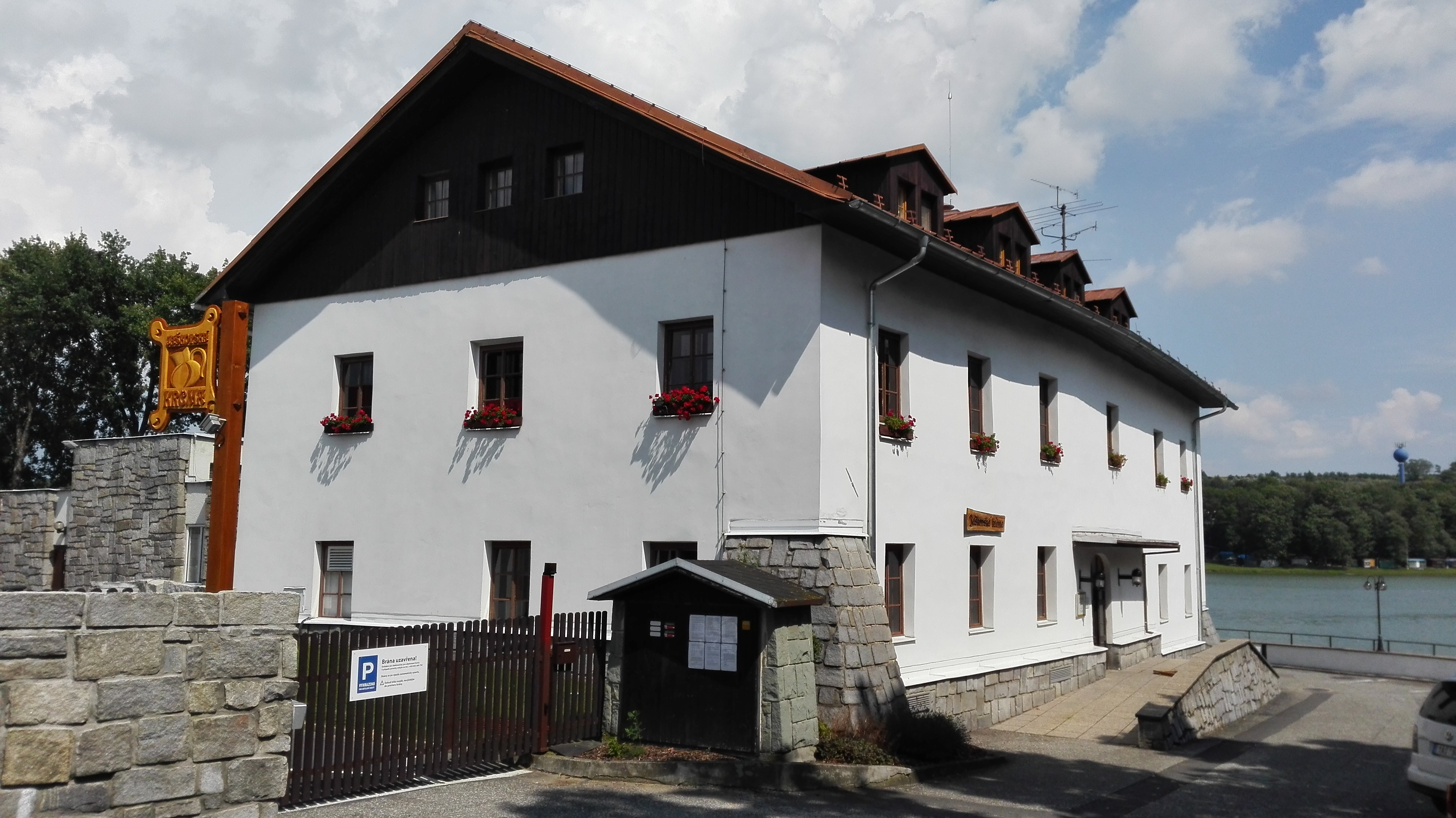
Tavern Jaškovská krčma

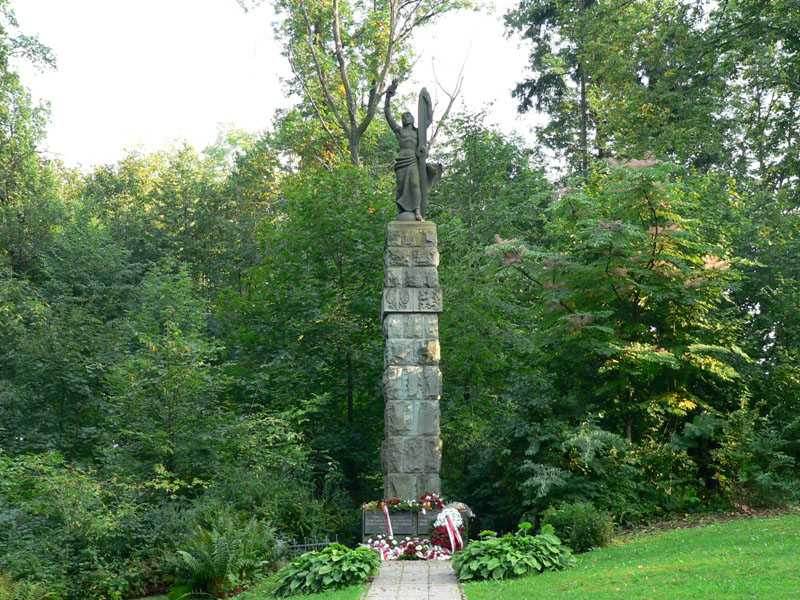
Monument to the Pilots

There was a wooden Catholic church in the municipality. In 1769–1772 it was replaced by a new brick Baroque church consecrated to the Holy Trinity, but this church was demolished in 1962 during the reservoir's construction. The Church of Saint Lawrence was built on Kostelec Hill in 1889–1891. After the old church was demolished, it became a parish church. The entrance to the church is decorated with two statues of the apostles from the second half of the 19th century. The church has part of the valuable Baroque inventory from the flooded church, especially Baroque paintings and a number of sculptures from the mid-18th century. The most remarkable is the painting of St. Lawrence from 1659 and baroque paintings of the Crucifixion and Holy Trinity.

The Lutheran church was built in 1967. The tower was added in 1997.

Larisch's manor is a former aristocratic residence from the early 19th century, built in the Empire style. Today it is privately owned and used for recreational purposes.

The tavern Jaškovská krčma is the oldest pub in Silesia and one of the oldest in the Czech Republic. The first mention of the pub is from 1268. Originally it was a refuge for robbers and there was a secret passage in the cellar that was used to escape from enemies. Later it was fortified and equipped with a permanent guard, which took care of the safety of passengers on the road and collected tolls. The building was damaged by a fire in 1682, but was rebuilt nine years after the fire into its current form. Today it still serves as a hotel and restaurant. The interior is decorated with frescoes.

Monument to the Pilots (Żwirkowisko) is a monument to Polish aviators Stanisław Wigura and Franciszek Żwirko, winners of the most prestigious aviation competition in Europe, who died here in a tragic plane crash on 11 September 1932. The monument is in the form of a life-size pilot, who holds a twig of victory and leans on the propeller of a plane. An educational trail leads to the monument.

== Notable people ==
- Wacław Maciejowski (1792–1883), Polish historian
- Andrzej Kotula (1822–1891), Polish lawyer and activist

== Twin towns – sister cities ==
Těrlicko is twinned with:

- Chybie, Poland
