= Płyniesz Olzo po dolinie =

1889 poem by Jan Kubisz

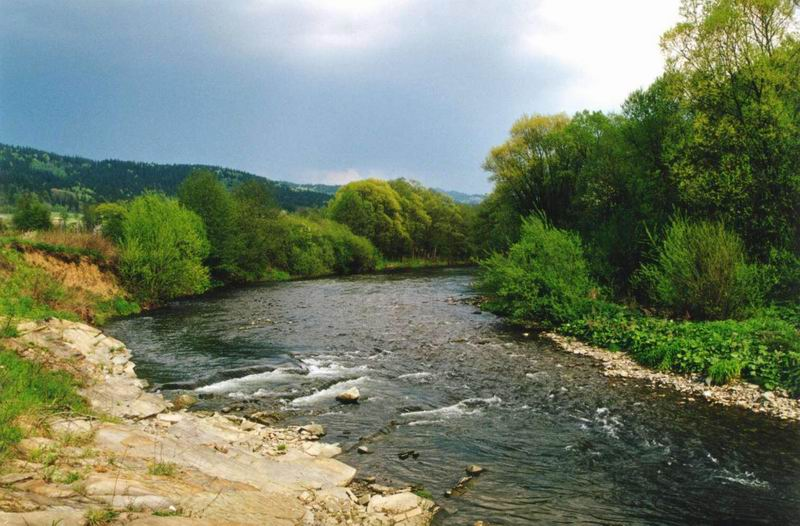
The Olza River at Hrádek

"Płyniesz Olzo po dolinie" ("You flow, Olza, down the valley") is a poem by Polish educator and poet Jan Kubisz. It is an unofficial anthem of Cieszyn Silesia, particularly of the Polish minority in the Czech Republic. Its theme is the cultural assimilation of, and loss of national identity by, local Poles. The lyrics are centered on the Olza River, symbol of Cieszyn Silesia and Trans-Olza.

It was published in 1889 as Nad Olzą (On the Olza), part of Śpiewy starego Jakuba (Songs of Old Jacob) poetry collection.

== Lyrics ==
Płyniesz, Olzo, po dolinie,
Płyniesz, jak przed laty,
Takie same na twym brzegu
Kwitną wiosną kwiaty.

A twe wody w swoim biegu,
Się nie zamąciły;
I tak samo lśnią się w słońcu,
Jak się dawniej lśniły.

Ale ludzie w życiu swojem
Zmienili się bardzo;
Zwyczajami, wiarą przodków
Ledwie że nie gardzą.

I dąb z dębem na twym brzegu,
Jak szumiał tak szumi;
Lecz wnuk starą mowę dziadów
Ledwie że rozumie.

Na twym brzegu dawnym śpiewem
Słowik się odzywa;
A dziś śliczne pieśni nasze
Ledwie że kto śpiewa!

Jordan w ziemi Chananejskiej,
Święte ma znaczenie:
W jego wodach Izraela
Lud brał oczyszczenie.

Więc z modlitwą uklęknąłem
W pokorze przed Panem:
Byś się stała, Olzo, takim
I dla nas Jordanem!

A tak kiedyś - gdy nad falą
Wiosną wiatr zawieje,
Wnuk usłyszy w fal twych szumie
Przodków swoich dzieje,

I usiędzie na twym brzegu
dumać nad przeszłością -
I żyć będzie dla swej ziemi
Czynem i miłością! (Note: This is the original text from the poet's house in Gnojnik. Lyrics well-known and spread among people somewhat differ.)

Translation:

You flow, Olza, down the valley,
You flow on as of old,
In spring, on your shores,
The same flowers bloom.

And your waters, in their course,
Have not grown dim;
They still shine in the sun,
As they shone before.

But in their lives
Men have greatly changed;
They all but disdain
The customs and faith of their fathers.

And on your shores the oak trees
Rustle one to another;
But the grandson barely grasps
The speech of his fathers.

On your shores, the nightingale
Sings its old songs;
But hardly anyone now sings
Our beautiful anthems!

The Jordan is holy
In the land of Canaan:
In its waters the Israelites
Found their cleansing.

So with a prayer I knelt
Humbly before the Lord:
That you become, Olza,
Our Jordan!

And someday, when the spring wind blows
Over your waves,
The grandson will hear in their murmur
The story of his forebears.

And he will sit down on your bank
To think upon the past —
And will live for his land
With deed and with love!
