= Kotula =

Kotula or Kotuľa is a surname. It may refer to:

- Andrzej Kotula (1822–1891), Polish lawyer and activist
- Bolesław Kotula (1849–1898), Polish naturalist
- Jozef Kotula (born 1976), Slovak footballer
- Juraj Kotula (born 1995), Slovak footballer
- Katarzyna Kotula (born 1977), Polish teacher and politician
- Mirosława Zakrzewska-Kotula (1932–1985), Polish volleyball player, basketball player, handball player and coach
- Peter Kotuľa (born 1982), Slovak musician and singer
