= Osmo =

Male given name

Osmo is a Finnish male given name. It appears in Kalevala, where it means "a young man". The name has been in use since the 1880s. The name day for Osmo in Finland is 11 May.

== People with the name Osmo ==
- Osmo Ala-Honkola (1939–2020), Finnish sports shooter
- Osmo Kontula (born 1951), Finnish sociologist
- Osmo Lindeman (1929–1987), Finnish composer
- Osmo Pekonen (1960–2022), Finnish mathematician
- Osmo Tapio Räihälä (born 1964), Finnish composer
- Osmo Soininvaara (born 1951), politician, previous member of the Finnish government
- Osmo Vänskä (born 1953), Finnish conductor
- Osmo Valtonen (1929–2002), Finnish artist
