= Franciszek Żwirko =

Polish aviator (1895–1932)

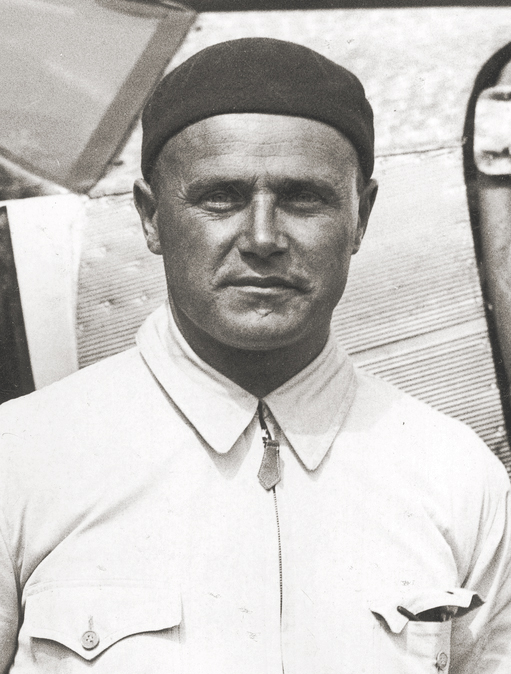
- Franciszek Żwirko in 1932
- Born: 16 September 1895; Sventiany, Russian Empire
- Died: 11 September 1932 (aged 36); Těrlicko, Czechoslovakia
- Resting place: Powązki Cemetery
- Occupation: Aviator

Signature
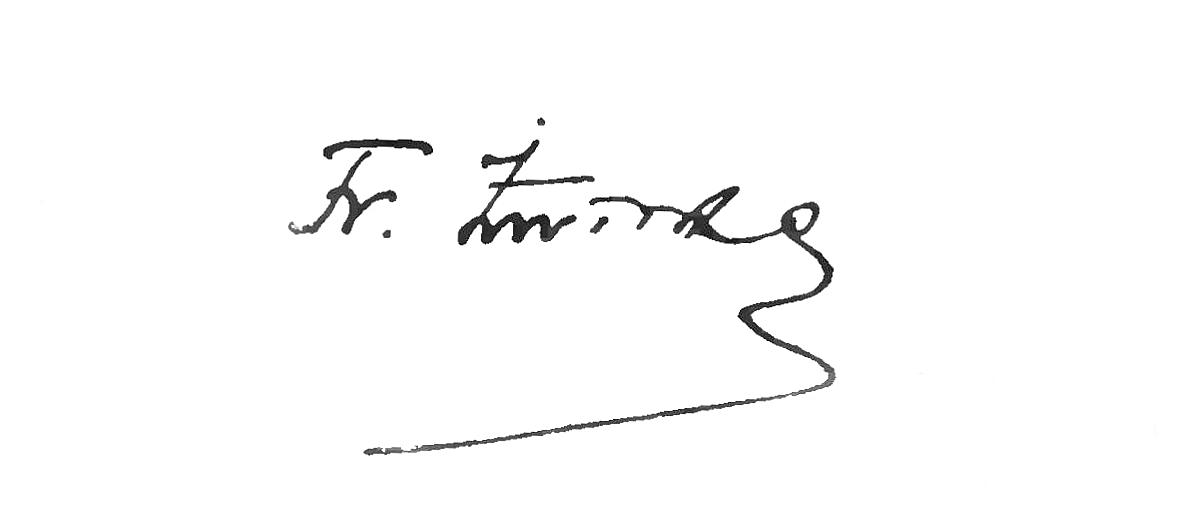

Franciszek Żwirko (Polish pronunciation: [franˈt͡ɕi.ʂɛk ˈʐvir.kɔ]; 16 September 1895 – 11 September 1932) was a prominent Polish sport and military aviator. Along with Stanisław Wigura, he won the international air contest Challenge 1932.

== Biography ==
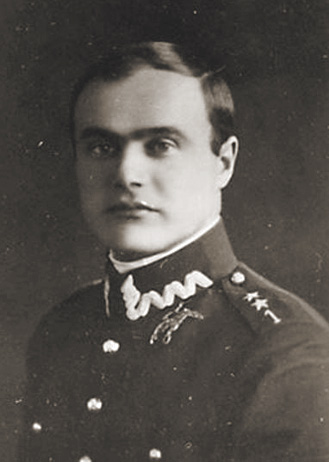
Żwirko in 1927

He was born in Sventiany, near Vilnius in Lithuania (at that time part of the Russian Empire), and attended school in Vilnius. During World War I, he volunteered for the Russian Army, graduated from an officer school in Irkutsk, and served in infantry, fighting against the Germans. He was awarded the Order of St. Anna, 4th class. In 1917, he joined the Polish corps of Gen. Józef Dowbor-Muśnicki, formed in Russia. After the corps was disbanded in 1918, he enlisted in Gen. Anton Denikin's Volunteer Army and fought against the Bolsheviks in the Russian Civil War. He completed an air observer course. After the Bolsheviks' victory in the war in 1921, Żwirko fought his way to Poland across the Soviet-Polish border.

In Poland, he graduated from an aviation school in Bydgoszcz in November 1923, and a higher pilotage school in Grudziądz. He became a fighter pilot in the 18th Fighter Squadron of the 1st Air Regiment, with a rank of porucznik pilot (flying lieutenant). He also became active in sports aviation. Żwirko distinguished himself as a very skilled and calm pilot. In August 1927, flying a Breguet 19 military plane, he took the 2nd place in the 1st air contest of the Little Entente and Poland in Yugoslavia, and the 1st place in its rally part. From 1929 he was assigned as a liaison officer in the University Aeroclub (Aeroklub Akademicki) in Warsaw.

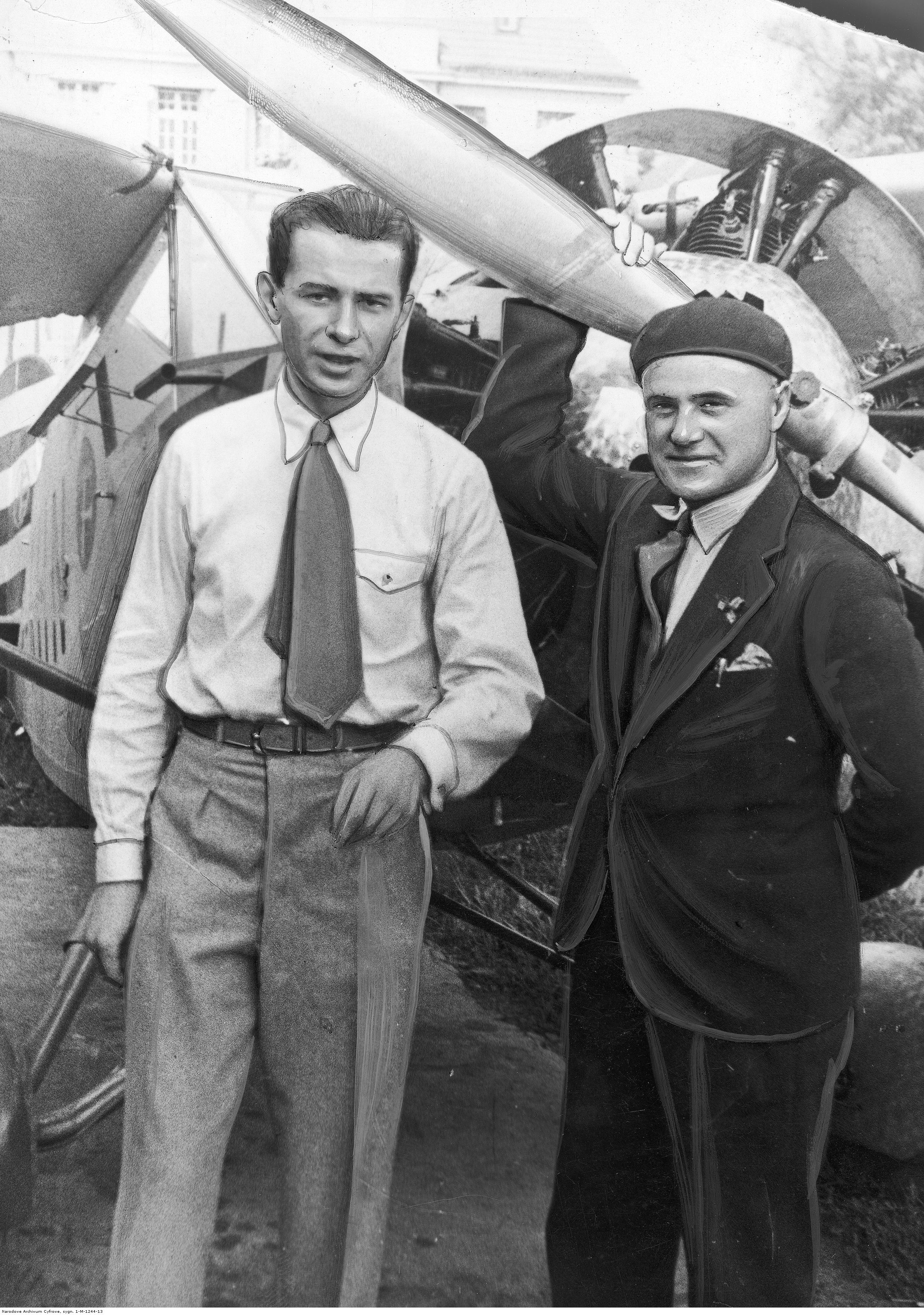
Stanisław Wigura and Franciszek Żwirko, 1932

Thanks to his new post, he could increase his sporting activity, meeting young aviation enthusiasts - mostly students of Warsaw University of Technology. He especially made friends with young engineer Stanislaw Wigura, one of the designers of the RWD team. They often flew together from then, Wigura as a mechanic and second pilot. Between 9 August and 6 September 1929, Żwirko and Wigura flew the RWD-2 prototype across Europe, on Warsaw–Paris–Barcelona–Milan–Warsaw 5,000 kilometres (5,000,000 m) route, and on October 6 they won in the 1st Rally of South-Eastern Poland. On October 16, 1929, Żwirko and Antoni Kocjan set an international FAI altitude record of 4,004 metres (13,136 ft) in the light tourist plane class (below 280 kg or 616 lb empty weight) on that plane.

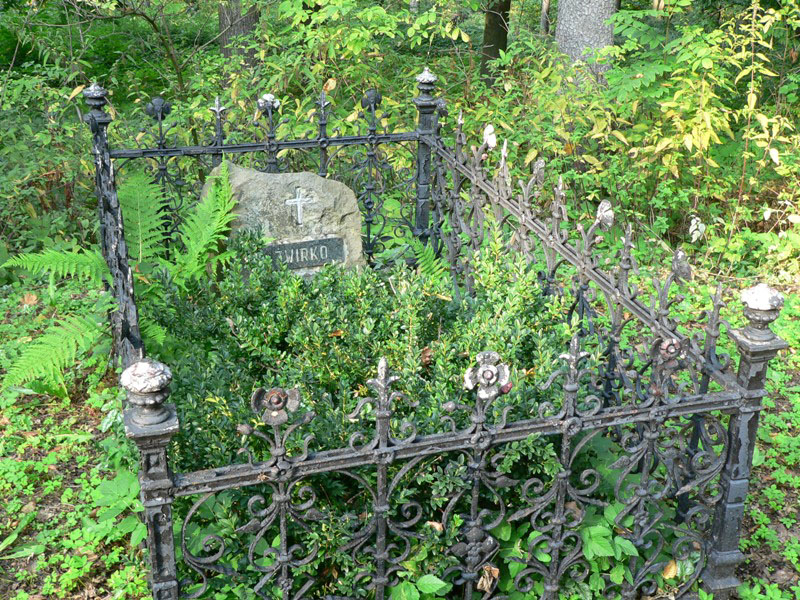
Symbolic grave of Żwirko in Cierlicko, in the place of his fatal crash.

In July 1930, Żwirko and Wigura took part in the International Tourist Plane Competition Challenge 1930, flying the RWD-4, but they had to withdraw on July 25 due to engine failure, after an emergency landing in Spain. In September and October 1930, they won two contests in Poland (the 2nd Rally of South-Eastern Poland flying RWD-2 and the 3rd Light Aircraft Contest, flying RWD-4), and in October 1931 they won the 4th Touring Planes Contest, flying on a prototype RWD-5. On August 7, 1931, Żwirko and Stanisław Prauss tried to break another altitude record, on RWD-7, climbing at 5,996 metres (19,672 ft), but it was not recognized by the FAI due to a non-standard recording device.

In December 1931, Żwirko was assigned a training escadre commander in an aviation school in Dęblin. In April 1932 he was selected for the Polish team for the International Tourist Plane Competition Challenge 1932, taking place between August 20-August 28, 1932, and he chose Wigura as his crewmate. They won the competition, over favourite German and other teams, flying the new RWD-6, and became heroes in Poland. The success was brought by Żwirko's pilotage skills and high quality of the plane, designed among others, by Wigura.

On 11 September 1932, while flying to an air meet in Prague, Żwirko and Wigura were killed when their RWD-6 crashed in a forest near Cierlicko, close to Cieszyn, after one of its wings failed during a severe storm. A monument marking the crash site was erected shortly afterwards and became known as Żwirkowisko.

The two men were buried in the Avenue of the Meritorious in Powązki Cemetery in Warsaw.

== Honours and awards ==
On 14 September 1932, the President of Poland posthumously awarded Żwirko the Knight's Cross of the Order of Polonia Restituta "for his contribution in the field of propaganda in the international aviation" and, on March 12, 1933, he received a posthumous promotion to the captain with seniority from 1 January 1933.

He had also been decorated with the Gold and Silver Crosses of Merit and the Russian Order of St. Anna, class IV (combat merit).
