= Andrzej Kotula =

Polish lawyer and national activist

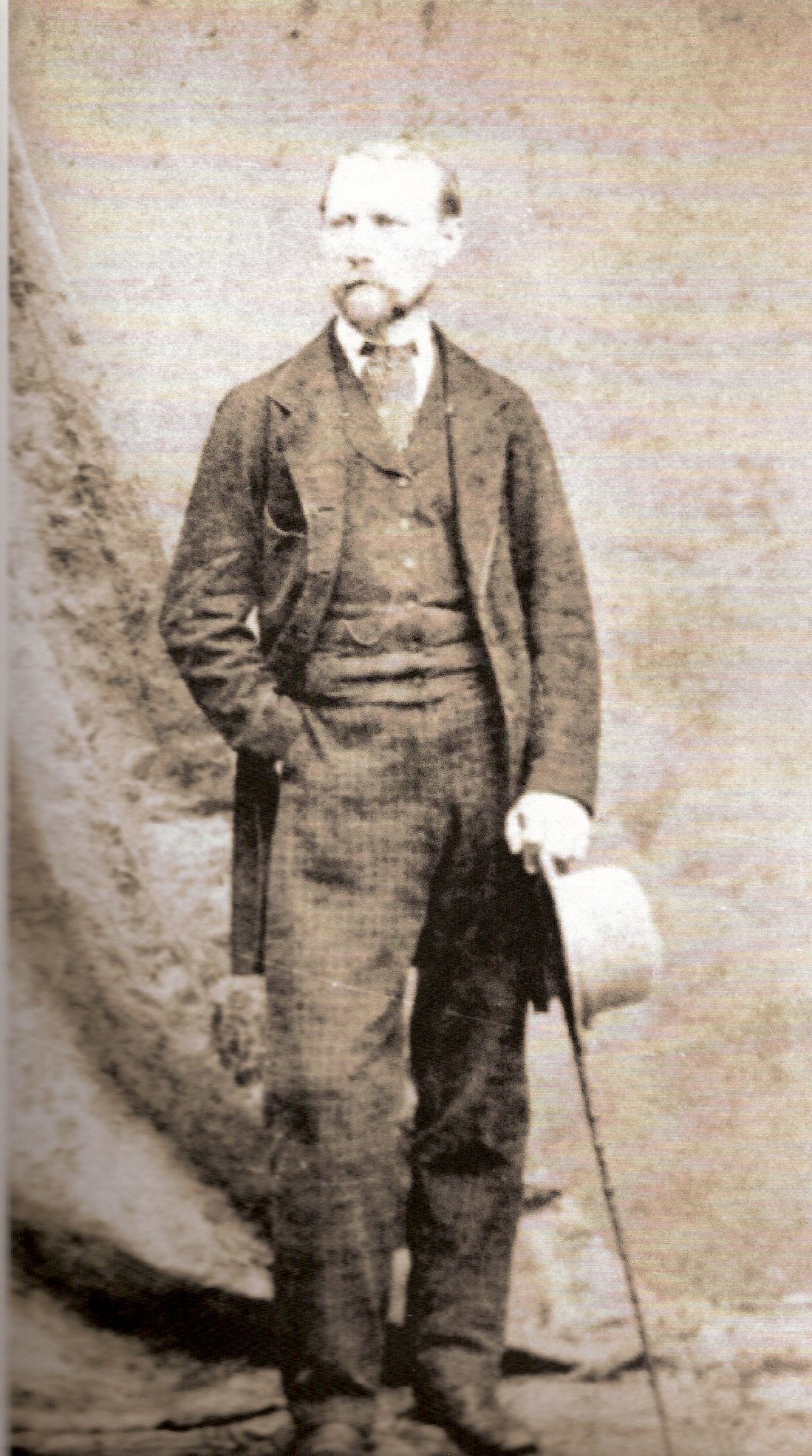
- Andrzej Kotula
- Born: 10 February 1822; Grodziszcz, Austrian Empire
- Died: 10 October 1891 (aged 69); Cieszyn, Austria-Hungary
- Citizenship: Austrian
- Occupation(s): Lawyer, activist
- Spouse: Anna Tetla
- Children: Bolesław, Andrzej, Jerzy

Andrzej Kotula (10 February 1822 in Grodziszcz – 10 October 1891 in Cieszyn) was a Polish lawyer and activist from Cieszyn Silesia.

He was son of Józef, peasant, and Maria. Kotula graduated from Protestant gymnasium in Cieszyn and philosophical high school in Pressburg. In 1848 he graduated in law from the University of Vienna, where he met Paweł Stalmach, with whom he later cooperated closely back in Cieszyn Silesia. In the same year Kotula together with Stalmach participated in Slavic Congress in Prague, where they were protesting against including Cieszyn Poles in the Czecho-Slovak section.

In 1848-1891 he contributed to Tygodnik Cieszyński and Gwiazdka Cieszyńska magazines. Since 1853 he worked as an administration clerk in Ipolyság, Hungary. In 1857 he moved to Frysztat, where he worked as notary. In 1867 Kotula came back to Cieszyn, where he ran his notary office until his death.

Kotula was very active in public life, always engaging in establishing various Polish associations and institutions. He was also an active member of the Lutheran community. He was secretary of Czytelnia Ludowa (People's Library), member of several organizations and one of the founders of Macierz Szkolna Księstwa Cieszyńskiego (School Association of the Duchy of Cieszyn). Kotula wrote poems, fairy tales and ballads.

Kotula was interested in botany - he was collecting and conserving plants, mushrooms, beetles and butterflies.

He had three sons - botanist Bolesław, engineer Andrzej, and bookseller and publisher Jerzy.
