= Żwirkowisko =

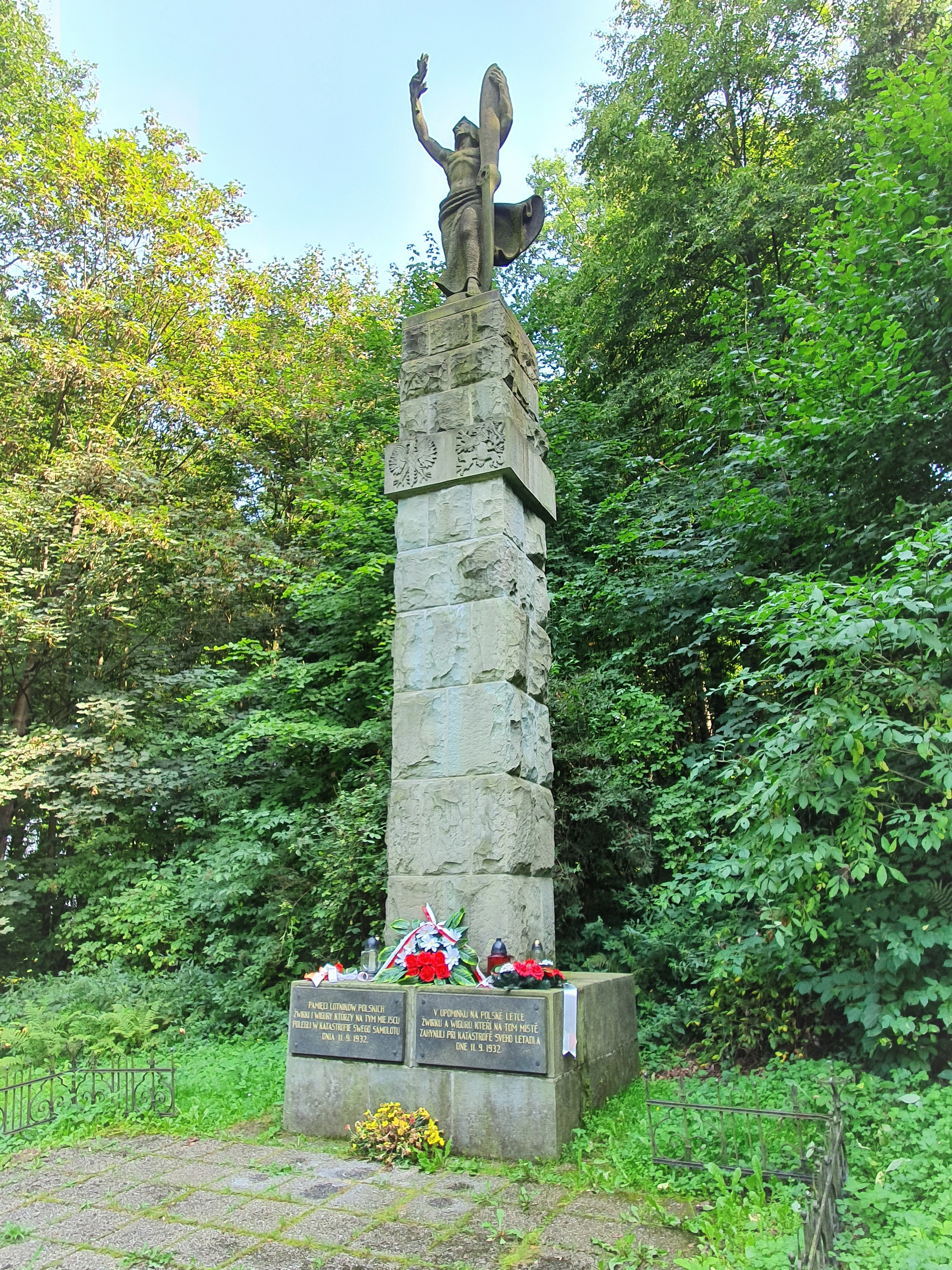
- Interactive map of Żwirkowisko
- Location: Těrlicko, Moravian-Silesian Region, Czech Republic
- Coordinates: 49.763118°N 18.528019°E
- Type: Memorial site
- Completion date: 1932
- Dedicated to: Franciszek Żwirko and Stanisław Wigura

Żwirkowisko (Polish pronunciation: [ʐvirkɔˈviskɔ]) is a memorial site in Těrlicko, Moravian-Silesian Region, Czech Republic. It marks the place where the Polish aviators Franciszek Żwirko and Stanisław Wigura were killed on 11 September 1932 when their RWD-6 aircraft crashed during a flight to Prague after their victory in the Challenge International de Tourisme 1932.

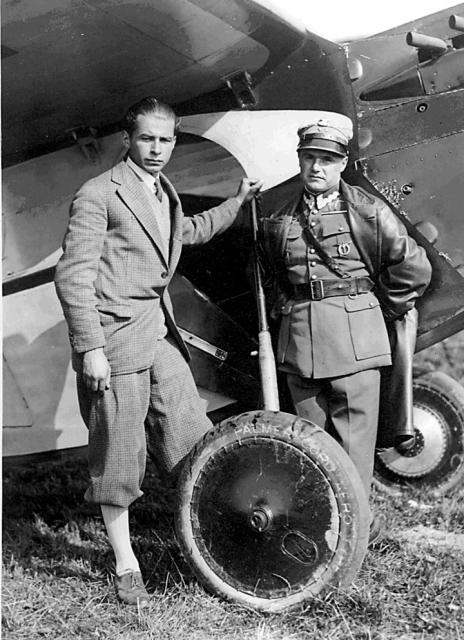
Wigura & Żwirko with RWD 4

The crash site was commemorated soon afterwards and became a place of remembrance for the Polish community in Zaolzie. A chapel-mausoleum completed in 1935 formed the centre of the original memorial, which was destroyed by the German occupation authorities in the annexed territory during the Second World War.

The present memorial was created after the Second World War and has since been expanded. It remains the principal venue for annual commemorations honouring the two aviators and one of the best-known memorial sites associated with the Polish community in Trans-Olza.

== Location ==
Żwirkowisko is located in the cadastral area of Kostelec (Polish: Kościelec), now part of the municipality of Těrlicko, about 12 km west of Český Těšín in the historic region of Cieszyn Silesia. At the time of the crash in 1932 the area belonged to Czechoslovakia; today it lies in the Czech Republic near the Polish border.

The memorial occupies a wooded hillside close to the crash site.

== History ==
=== Crash ===
On 28 August 1932, Franciszek Żwirko and Stanisław Wigura won the Challenge International de Tourisme 1932, one of Europe's leading touring aircraft competitions.

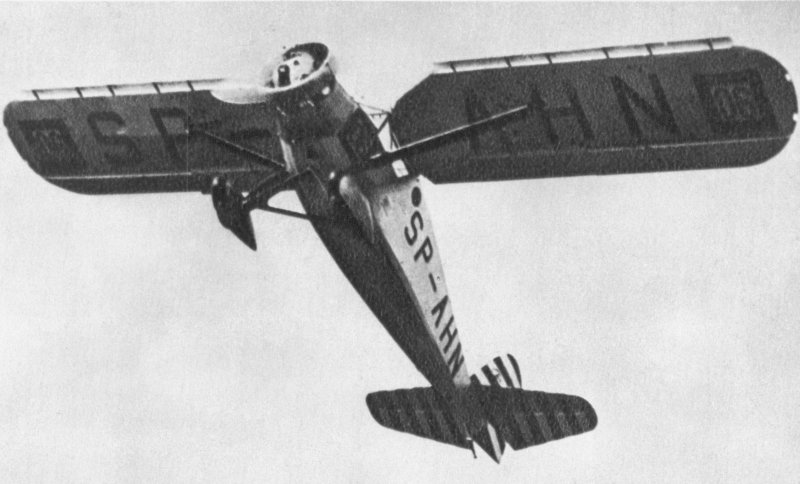
RWD-6

Two weeks later they departed for Prague in their RWD-6 to attend aviation events in Prague. While flying over the hills near Kościelec, the aircraft encountered severe weather, suffered structural failure and crashed into woodland. Both aviators were killed instantly.

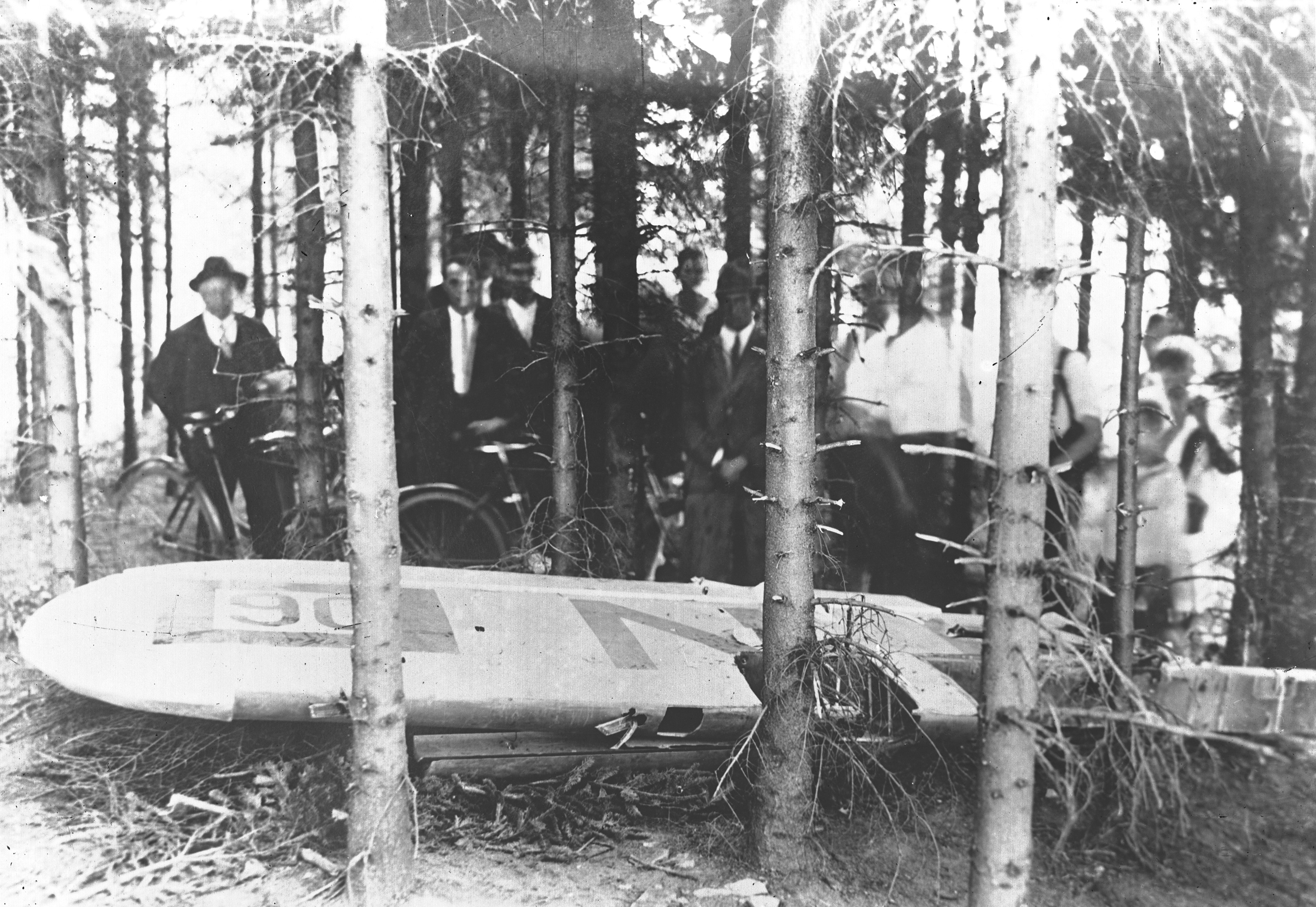
A wing of the crashed RWD-6

After official proceedings in Czechoslovakia, their bodies were taken to Warsaw, where a state funeral was held before their burial at Powązki Cemetery.

=== Early memorial ===
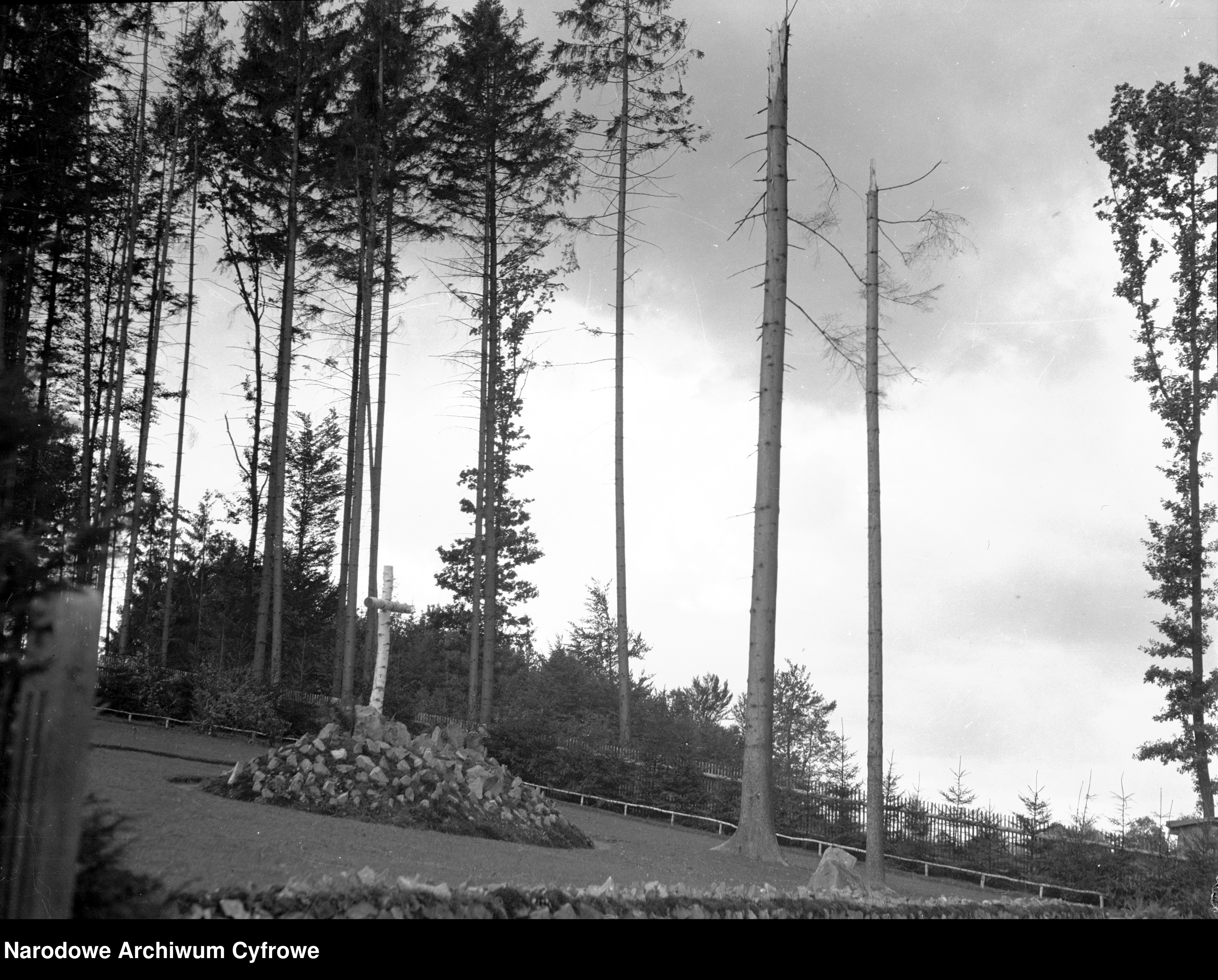
Early memorial 1933

Visitors began arriving at the crash site almost immediately after the accident, leaving flowers, crosses and other temporary tributes. Local Polish organisations soon began preserving the site as a permanent place of remembrance.

The first memorial consisted of a wooden cross incorporating an aircraft propeller, symbolic graves, preserved damaged trees and an inscribed boulder. The place gradually became known as Żwirkowisko, a name that has remained in use ever since.

Later in 1932, organisations on both sides of the Polish–Czechoslovak border formed a committee to create a permanent memorial. Although none of the original proposals was realised, the committee laid the foundations for the permanent memorial completed in 1935.

=== Permanent memorial ===
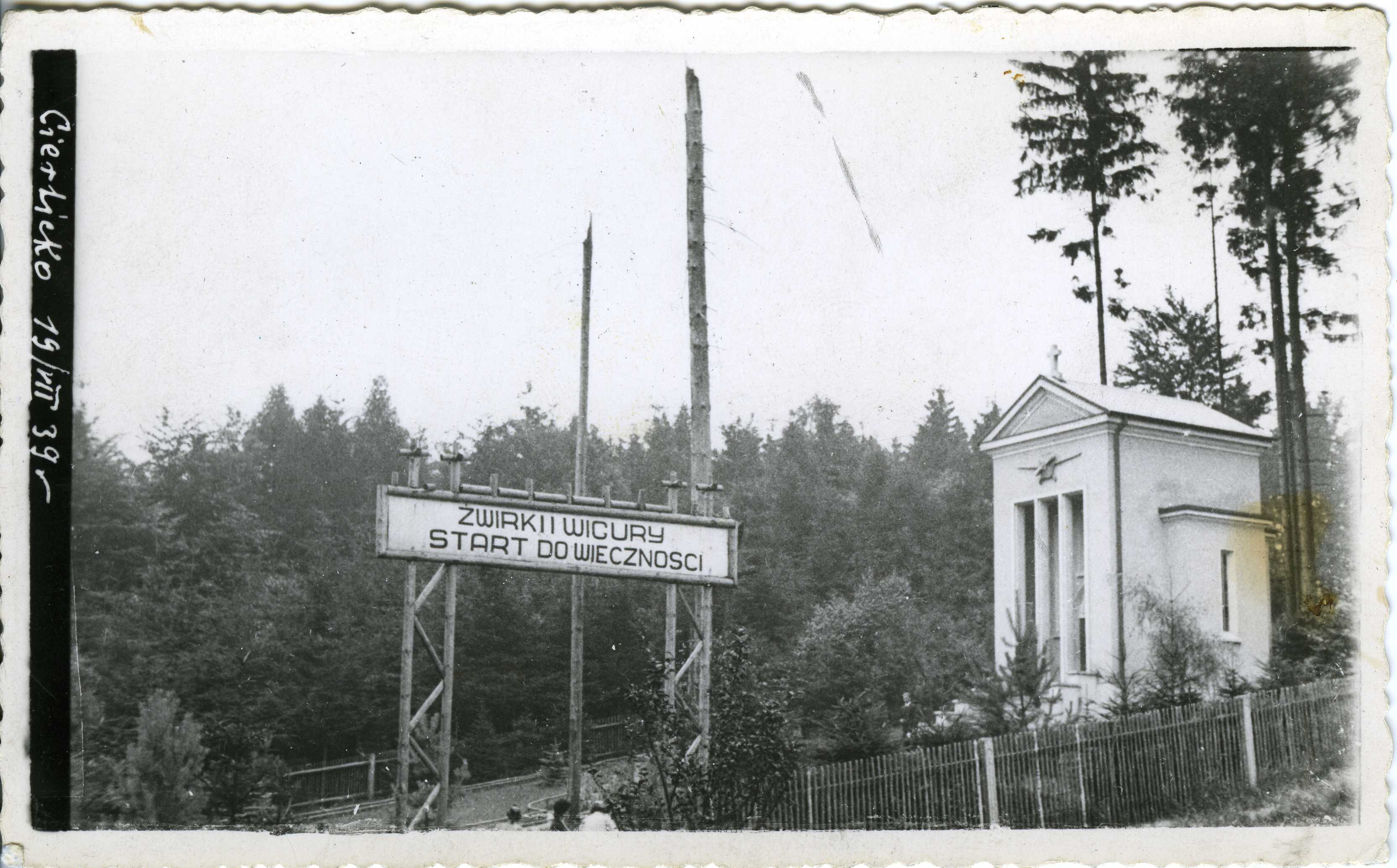
Permanent memorial 1939

The committee initially planned a large monument symbolising the shared admiration for Żwirko and Wigura in Poland and Czechoslovakia. Sculptors Jan Raszka and Julius Pelikán prepared designs, but the project was abandoned because of political tensions in the region.

Instead, the committee acquired the land surrounding the crash site and established a permanent memorial there by landscaping the grounds, laying out paths and incorporating the existing elements into the design.

Completed in 1935, the centrepiece was a chapel-mausoleum designed by Edward Dawid. It was accompanied by an entrance gate bearing the inscription "Żwirki i Wigury start do wieczności" ("Żwirko and Wigura's departure into eternity"), symbolic graves, preserved crash-damaged trees and other commemorative elements.

The completed complex soon became the centre of the annual commemorations and attracted visitors from across Cieszyn Silesia and Poland.

=== Destruction ===
The German occupation authorities in the annexed territory destroyed the memorial in 1940. The chapel-mausoleum and most of its architectural features were demolished, although local residents concealed parts of the entrance gate and the commemorative boulder, allowing them to be recovered after the war.

=== Reconstruction ===
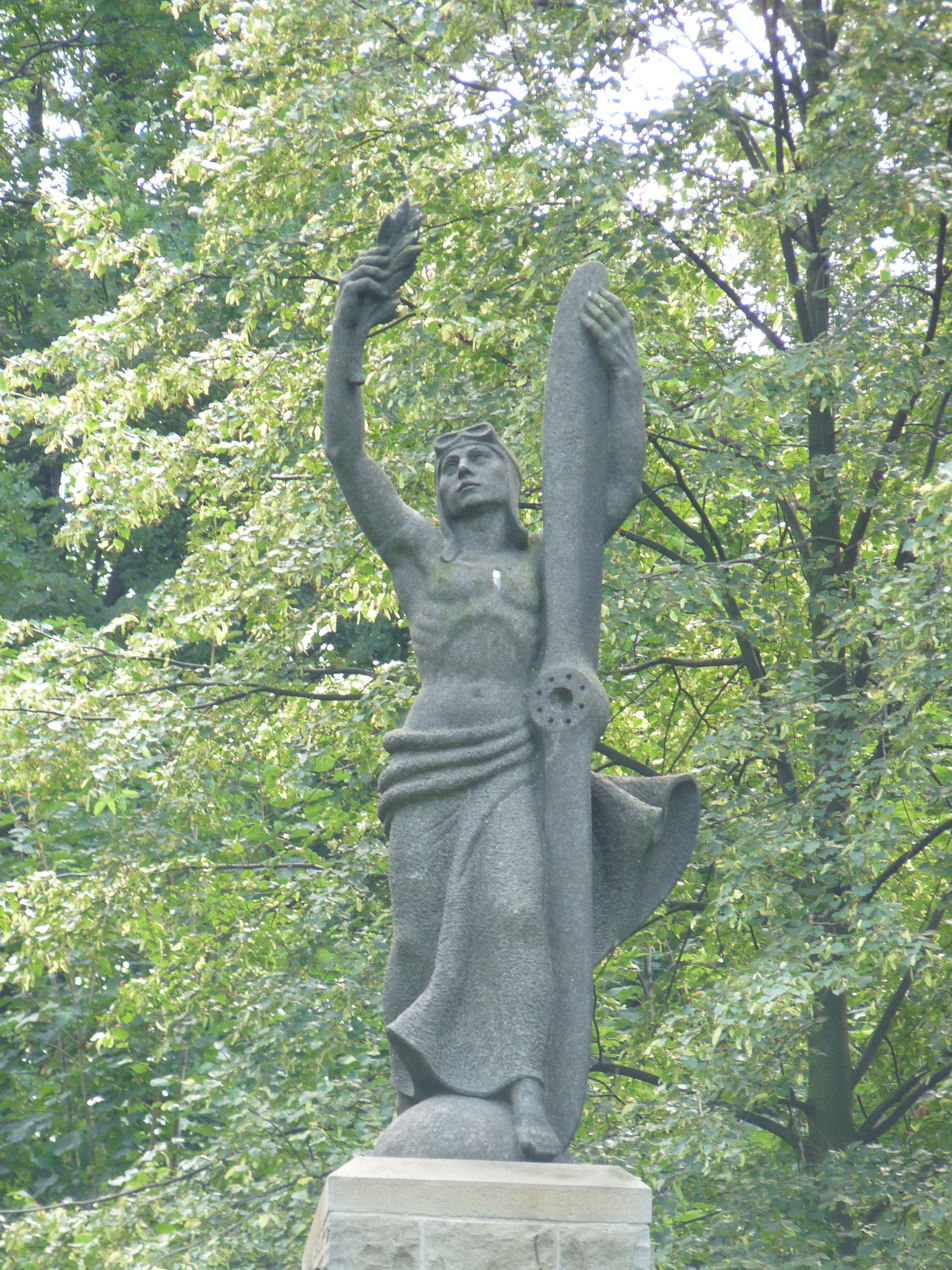
New monument

Reconstruction began after the Second World War, but the interwar mausoleum was not rebuilt. Instead, a new monument was created, centred on a bronze sculpture of a pilot by Julius Pelikán. It was erected on a high stone pedestal in 1950. The sculpture had originally been intended for the unrealised pre-war monument.

Further work continued throughout the 1950s. Before the twenty-fifth anniversary of the crash in 1957, bilingual plaques were installed and the grounds were further landscaped.

After 1989 the complex was expanded with additional monuments and plaques reflecting both the history of Żwirko and Wigura and that of the Polish community in Zaolzie. In 1994 the nearby Dom Polski Żwirki i Wigury opened as a cultural and educational centre associated with the site.

== Description ==
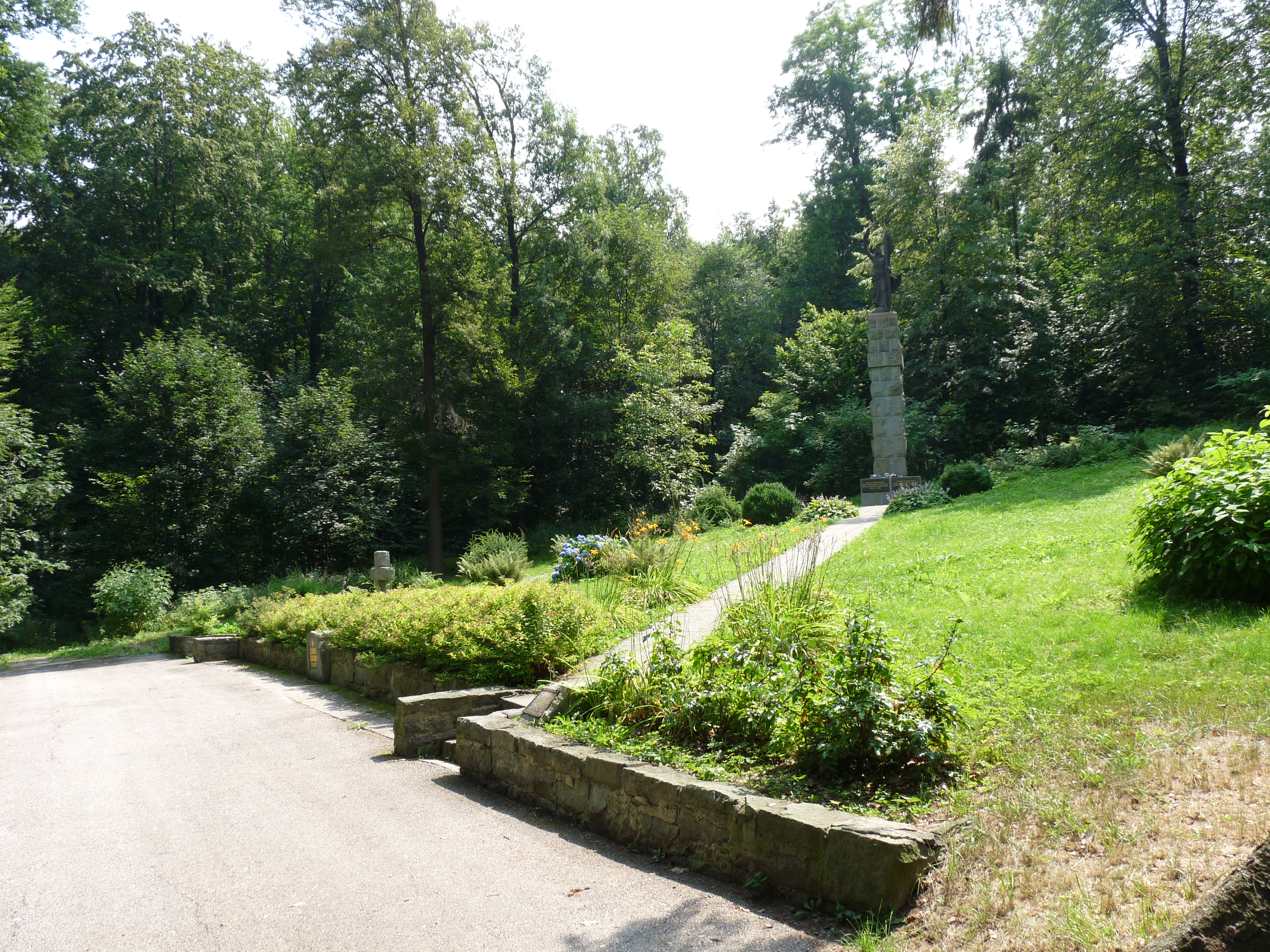
Żwirkowisko

Żwirkowisko occupies a wooded hillside at the site of the 1932 air crash.

The focal point is a stone monument topped by Julius Pelikán's bronze sculpture of a pilot.

The grounds also contain symbolic graves of the two aviators, commemorative plaques, surviving elements of the pre-war memorial, and monuments dedicated to members of the Polish Armed Forces, victims of the Katyn massacre, and other people and events associated with the history of the Polish community in Zaolzie.

== Commemorations ==
Annual ceremonies have been held at Żwirkowisko since the early 1930s, usually in September near the anniversary of the crash. They are organised by Polish organisations in the Czech Republic together with local authorities, aviation organisations and institutions from both the Czech Republic and Poland.

Ceremonies typically include religious services, wreath-laying, speeches and cultural events. Participants include representatives of the Congress of Poles in the Czech Republic, the Polish Cultural and Educational Union, local governments, diplomatic missions, military delegations, schools, scouting organisations and members of the public.

The commemorations remain among the best-known annual gatherings of the Polish community in Zaolzie, while continuing to honour the two aviators.

== Legacy ==
Żwirkowisko has become one of the best-known memorial sites associated with the Polish community in Zaolzie. Its history reflects the changing political circumstances of Cieszyn Silesia during the twentieth century, from its interwar creation and wartime destruction to its post-war reconstruction and continued development.

The memorial attracts visitors from both the Czech Republic and Poland and continues to honour Franciszek Żwirko and Stanisław Wigura.
