= Wacław Maciejowski =

Polish historian

Wacław Aleksander Maciejowski
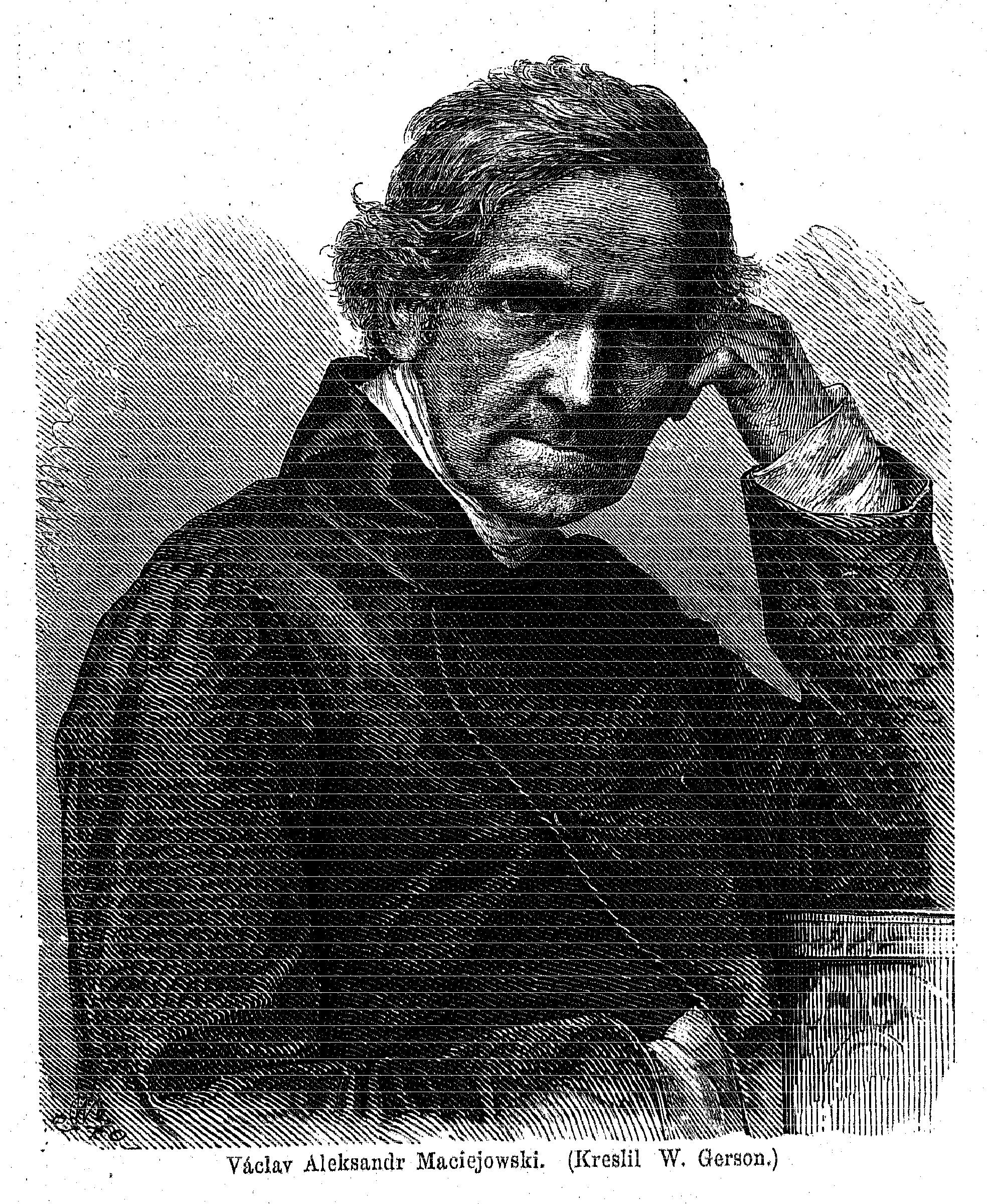
- Wacław Maciejowski in 1870
- Born: 10 September 1792; Cierlicko, Austrian Empire
- Died: 10 February 1883 (aged 90); Warsaw, Congress Poland
- Resting place: Warsaw
- Education: University of Warsaw, Humboldt University of Berlin, University of Göttingen
- Occupation: Historian

Wacław Aleksander Maciejowski (10 September 1792 – 10 February 1883) was a Polish historian.

Maciejowski was born in Cierlicko near Cieszyn. He studied in Warsaw, Berlin, and Göttingen, and became professor of law at the University of Warsaw in 1819.

He wrote three major works: a history of Slavic legislation (1832–38, 4 vols.; 2nd ed. 1856–65, 6 vols.), a history of Polish literature since the 16th century (1851–62, 3 vols.) and a history of the peasants of Poland (1874); the latter was the first monograph to be written on the Polish peasantry. He followed the historical Romanticism of Joachim Lelewel, and had a Pan-Slavic outlook.
