= Castle Hill Park, Cieszyn =

Park in Cieszyn, Poland

Coordinates: 49°45′05″N 18°37′30″E

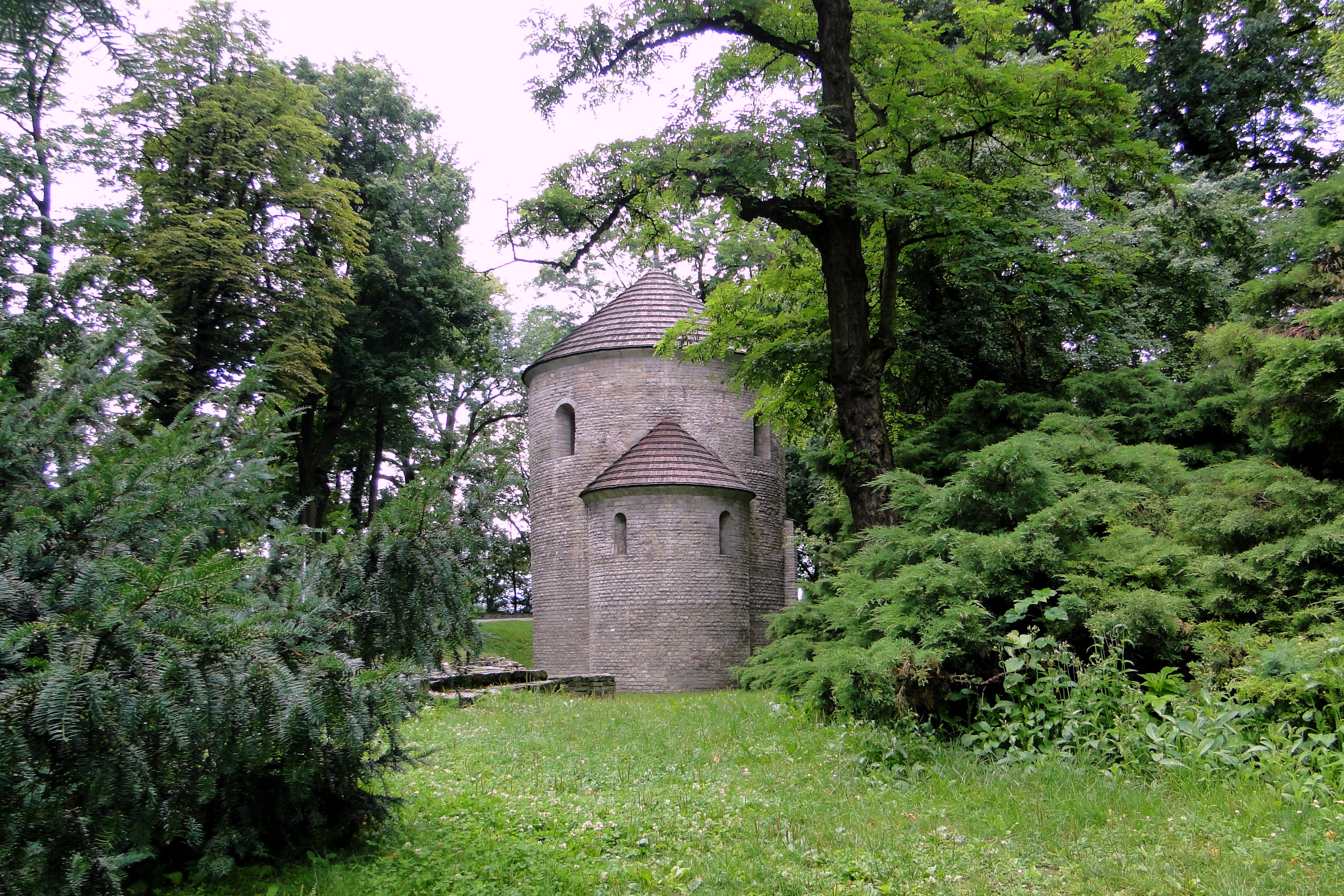
Saint Nicholas rotunda church in the Castle Hill Park

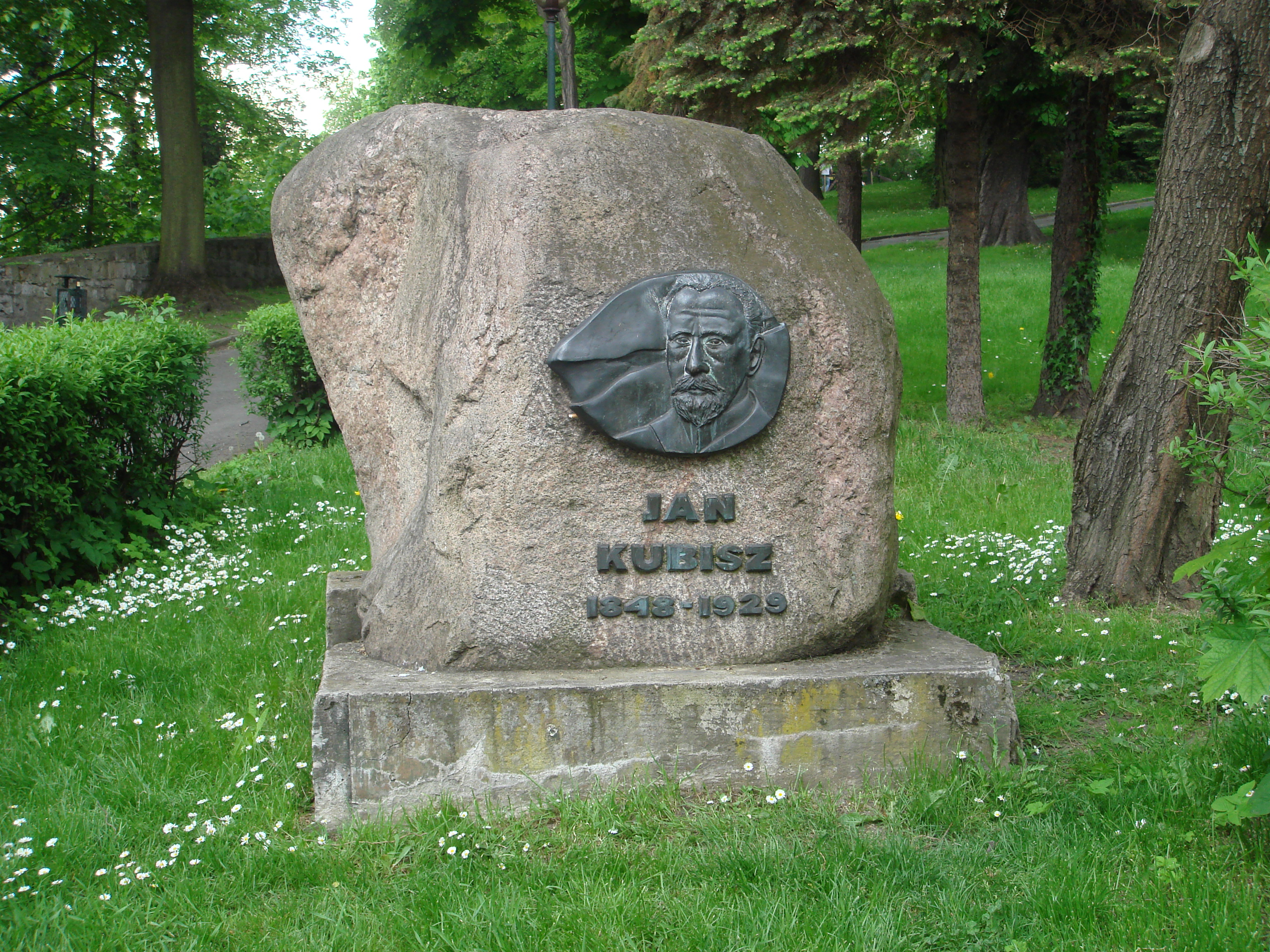
Monument to poet Jan Kubisz

The Castle Hill Park is a romantic park created on the initiative of Carl Habsburg in the 1840s on the Castle Hill in Cieszyn, Poland.

== History ==
A decision to rebuild Castle Hill was taken after the defensive stronghold constructed on it was destroyed during the Thirty Years' War. There are only a few historical sources that inform us about development of the grounds around the castle and allocating them for green areas. A development plan from 1836 indicates that at the upper castle there was a garden of irregular shape with a small square in the centre and four paths going outwards. Between the former upper and lower castle, there was a second garden shaped as an irregular polygon. In 1837 Carl Habsburg ordered the blowing up of the remains of the upper castle and the building of a castle in the Classicist style on the ruins of the lower castle. The new building was a summer residence of the Habsburg called the Hunting Palace of the Habsburg. The park at Castle Hill was designed by Joseph Kornhäusel, the court architect of the Viennese court. In 1914 in the north-west part of the hill artificial ruins were erected to emphasize the romantic nature of the park. Among the trees which grow on in the park on Castle Hill, eight are monuments of nature.

== List of trees and monuments of nature ==
The following trees growing in the part are worth mentioning:

- Pedunculate elms (263 cm/22 m and 223 cm/19 m), the first growing right at the entrance to the park on the left side of the aisle and the other slightly higher behind the wall from the side of Olza river
- Chestnuts (397 cm/23 m and 380 cm/23 m) grow next to each other in the lower part of the park on the right side of the path - monuments of nature
- European ash trees (407 cm/25 m and 440 cm/ 23 m), one is growing in the vicinity of the administration building of Cieszyn Castle - Zamkowa 3B Street, the second, double-trunked, dominates the panoramic terrace. The other ash trees grow on a scarp below the Piast Tower from the side of the castle brewery (273 cm/19 m) and over the location of the former carriage house where currently there are only fragments of walls (292 cm /21 m and 296 cm/21 m)
- Common hornbeams, the first one (191 cm/19 m) grows in the fork of a path leading from the entrance to the Rotunda and the Piast Tower, the remaining ones (201 cm/19 m and 189 cm/19) near the artificial ruins
- Tulip tree (Liriodendron tulipifera) (187 cm/20 m) is located halfway to the panoramic terrace, near the common hornbeams - monument of nature
- English yew variety: Dovastona, occupies an area of more than 100 m2 (12.5 m in diameter crown/ 2.5 m)
- Yellow chestnuts - two examples of that species grow in the centre of the park, one (198 cm/18 m) at the remains of the basement of the old fortifications near the Rotunda, the second (145+246 cm/20 m) on the lawn in front of the Piast Tower, next to the Rotunda - monuments of nature
- Field maple (194 cm/18 m) grows at the top of the scarp by the path leading from the panoramic terrace to the artificial ruins
- Cornelian cherry (59 cm/9 m) the bush grows at the top of the scarp by the path leading from the panoramic terrace to the artificial ruins
- Japanese cork tree (11 cm/2.5 m and 27 cm/4 m), the specimens growing on the edge of the lawn located on the top of Castle Hill
- Norway maple (291 cm/22 m) grows in front of the entrance to the Piast Tower
- Small-leaved lime tree (306 cm/20 m and 298 cm/19 m), standing near the Piast Tower from the side of the castle brewery sycomore maples (381 cm/24 m, 249 cm/19 m and 270 cm/20 m), the three largest specimens grow on the scarp from the side of the brewery
- Paper birch (82 cm/11 m), grows in the vicinity of stone stairs leading to the Piast Tower
- Chinese sephora (28 cm/ 4.5 m), grows at the edge of the park near the maple tree - a monument of nature
- Soulange's Magnolia variety Alexandra (58+44 cm/6 m), grows in the lower part of the park
- Japanese magnolia (52 to+68 cm/6 m), grows behind the chestnut trees - monuments of nature
- Salix babylonica (weeping willow) variety of a bent willow (20 cm/3.5 m), grows in front of the entrance to the park, near a monument commemorating Jan Kubisz
- Ginkgo of column variety - a monument of nature (165 cm/17 m), grows in the inner courtyard of the Castle
- English oaks of a conical form (170 cm/18 m and 117 cm/17 m), grow in the inner courtyard of the Castle
