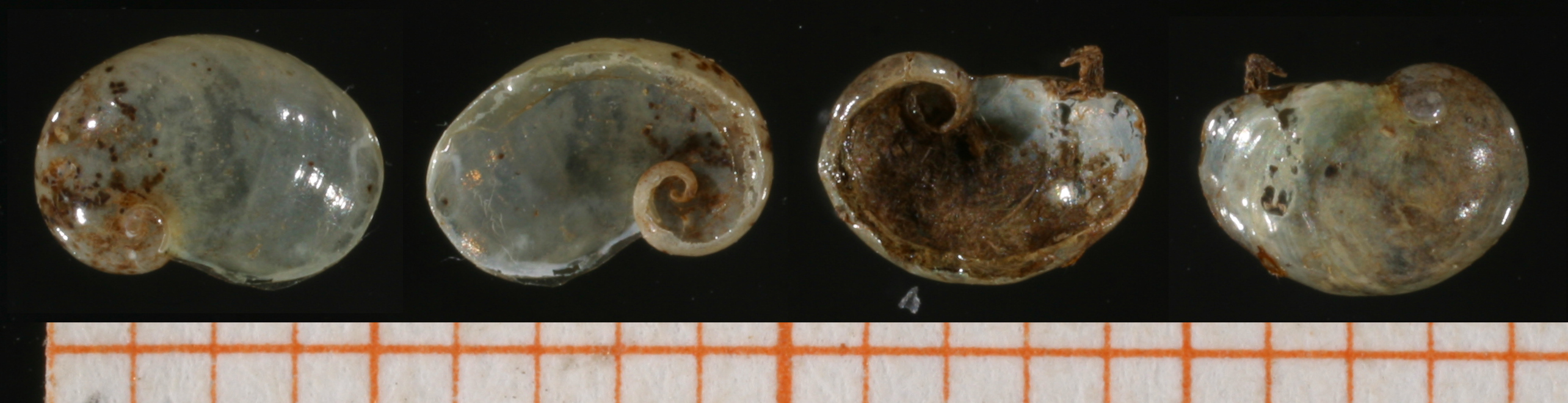

Scientific classification
- Kingdom: Animalia
- Phylum: Mollusca
- Class: Gastropoda
- Order: Stylommatophora
- Family: Vitrinidae
- Genus: Hessemilimax
- Species: H. kotulae

Binomial name
- Hessemilimax kotulae (Westerlund, 1883)

Synonyms
- Vitrina kotulai Westerlund, 1883; Semilimax kotulai (Westerlund, 1883)

= Hessemilimax =

Species of gastropod

Hessemilimax kotulae is a species of air-breathing land snail in the family Vitrinidae. The species name honours Bolesław Kotula.

== Distribution ==
This species occurs in:

- Czech Republic
- Ukraine
