= Stanisław Prauss =

Polish painter

- Born: 3 April 1902; Kielce, Poland
- Died: 23 April 1967 (aged 65); Kielce, Poland
- Occupation: Painter

Stanisław Prauss (3 April 1902 – 23 April 1967) was a Polish painter. His work was part of the painting event in the art competition at the 1928 Summer Olympics. Not to be confused with Polish aeronautical engineer Stanisław Prauss (1903-1997).
