= Hnojník =

Hnojník Gnojnik
- Municipality
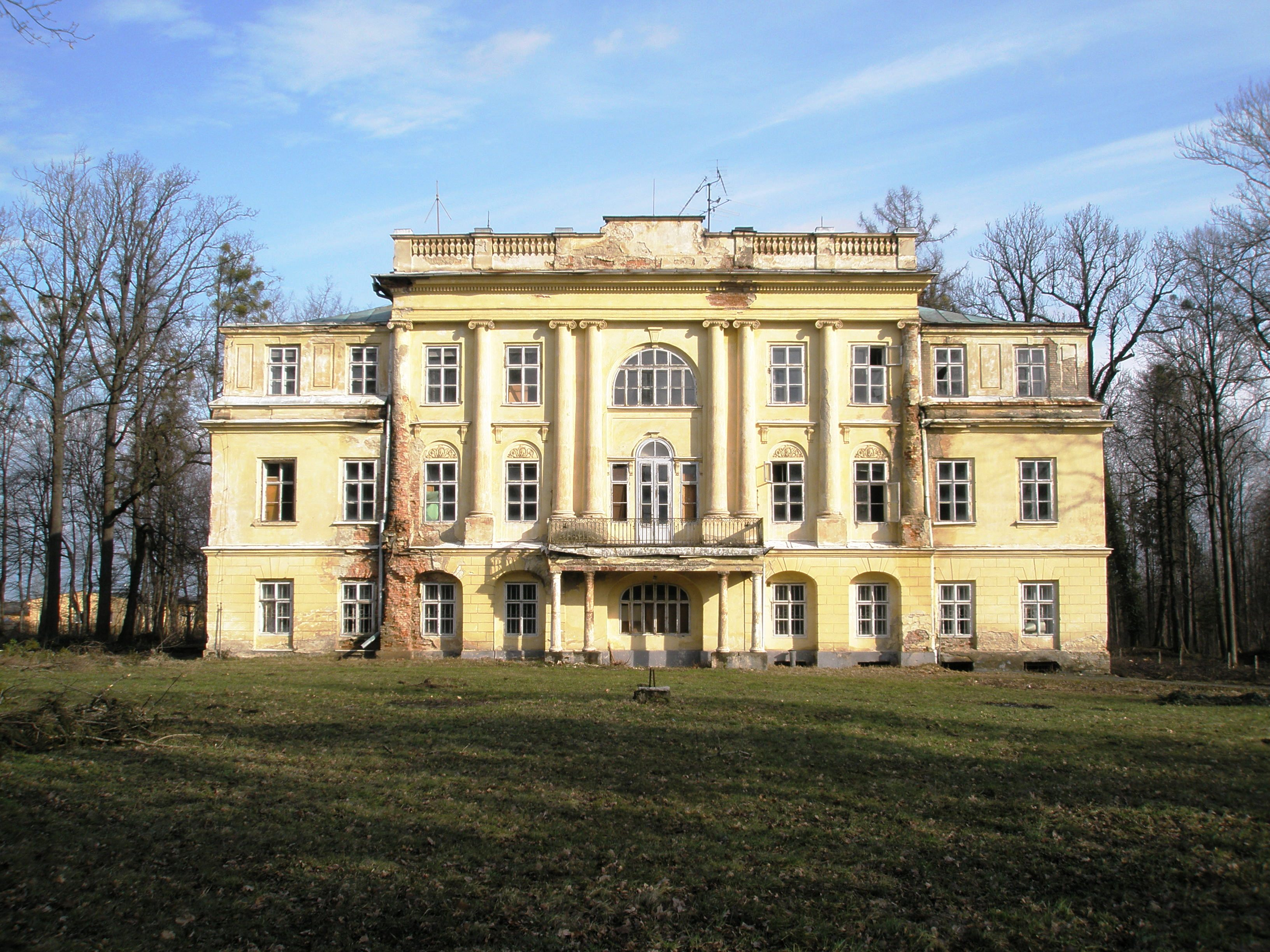
- Hnojník Castle

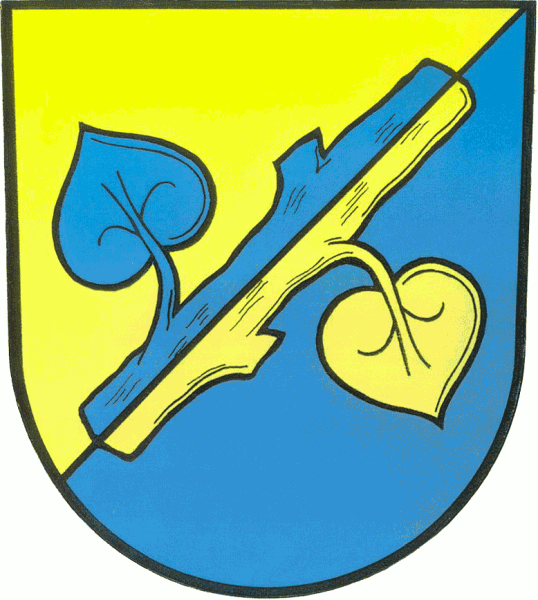
- Flag Coat of arms

- Location in the Czech Republic
- Coordinates: 49°40′56″N 18°32′29″E
- Country: Czech Republic
- Region: Moravian-Silesian
- District: Frýdek-Místek
- First mentioned: 1305

Area
  - Total: 6.42 km^{2} (2.48 sq mi)
- Elevation: 365 m (1,198 ft)

Population (2026-01-01)
  - Total: 1,477
  - Density: 230/km^{2} (596/sq mi)
- Time zone: UTC+1 (CET)
  - Summer (DST): UTC+2 (CEST)
- Postal code: 739 53
- Website: www.hnojnik.cz

Hnojník (Polish: Gnojnik, German: Hnoynik, Gnoynik) is a municipality and village in Frýdek-Místek District in the Moravian-Silesian Region of the Czech Republic. It has about 1,500 inhabitants. The municipality has a significant Polish minority.

== Etymology ==
The name is derived from the word hnůj (or obsolete hnoj), i.e. 'manure'. The origin of the name is uncertain. Either the village was named after a peat bog, which resembled manure in its consistency, or it was named after mushrooms from the genus Coprinus, which are also called hnojník in Czech.

== Geography ==
Hnojník is located about 12 kilometres (7 mi) east of Frýdek-Místek and 22 km (14 mi) southeast of Ostrava. It lies in the historical region of Cieszyn Silesia, in the Moravian-Silesian Foothills. The Stonávka River flows through the municipality.

== History ==
The village was probably founded by Slavs at the end of the 12th century. The first written mention of Hnojník is in a Latin document of Diocese of Wrocław called Liber fundationis episcopatus Vratislaviensis from around 1305 as Gnoynik. Politically Hnojník belonged initially to the Duchy of Teschen, from 1327 a fee of the Kingdom of Bohemia.

The village probably became a seat of a Catholic parish prior to the 16th century. After the 1540s, Protestant Reformation prevailed in the Duchy of Teschen and a local Catholic church was taken over by Lutherans. It was taken from them (as one from around fifty buildings) in the region by a special commission and given back to the Roman Catholic Church on 23 March 1654.

Until 1483, Hnojník was owned by the princes of Tetschen. After 1483, it was owned by several noble families. In 1736, the village was bought by Karl Beess. Shortly after, he had built a one-storey Baroque castle. The Beess family was the last feudal owner of the Hnojník estate.

After Revolutions of 1848 in the Austrian Empire a modern municipal division was introduced in the re-established Austrian Silesia. The village as a municipality was subscribed to the political and legal district of Cieszyn. According to the censuses conducted in 1880–1910, the population of the municipality dropped from 599 in 1880 to 569 in 1910 with a dwindling majority being native Polish-speakers (from 97% in 1880 to 90.5% in 1910) accompanied by a German-speaking people (between 3% and 3.5%) and Czech-speaking (growing from 8 or 1.4% in 1890 to 34 or 6% in 1910). In terms of religion in 1910 majority were Protestants (57%), followed by Roman Catholics (41.5%) and Jews (9 or 1.5%).

After World War I, Polish–Czechoslovak War and the division of Cieszyn Silesia in 1920, the municipality became a part of Czechoslovakia. Following the Munich Agreement, in October 1938 together with the Trans-Olza region it was annexed by Poland, administratively adjoined to Cieszyn County of Silesian Voivodeship. It was then annexed by Nazi Germany at the beginning of World War II. After the war it was restored to Czechoslovakia.

The Beess family property was confiscated in November 1945 according to the Beneš decrees. In 1946, the German-speaking population, including the Beess family, was expelled.

== Demographics ==
According to the 2021 Census, Polish minority makes up 12.4% of the population.

Historical population

Year	Pop.	±%
1869	607	—
1880	599	−1.3%
1890	559	−6.7%
1900	532	−4.8%
1910	569	+7.0%

Year	Pop.	±%
1921	612	+7.6%
1930	815	+33.2%
1950	914	+12.1%
1961	1,181	+29.2%
1970	1,276	+8.0%

Year	Pop.	±%
1980	1,427	+11.8%
1991	1,484	+4.0%
2001	1,446	−2.6%
2011	1,479	+2.3%
2021	1,439	−2.7%

Source: Censuses

== Transport ==
The I/68 road (part of the European route E75), which connects the D48 motorway with the Czech–Slovak border in Mosty u Jablunkova, runs through the northern part of the municipality.

== Education ==
In the municipality is a Czech-language primary school with a kindergarten named after Tomáš Garrigue Masaryk, and a Polish-language primary school named after Jan Kubisz, who is the most famous personality linked to Hnojník.

== Sights ==
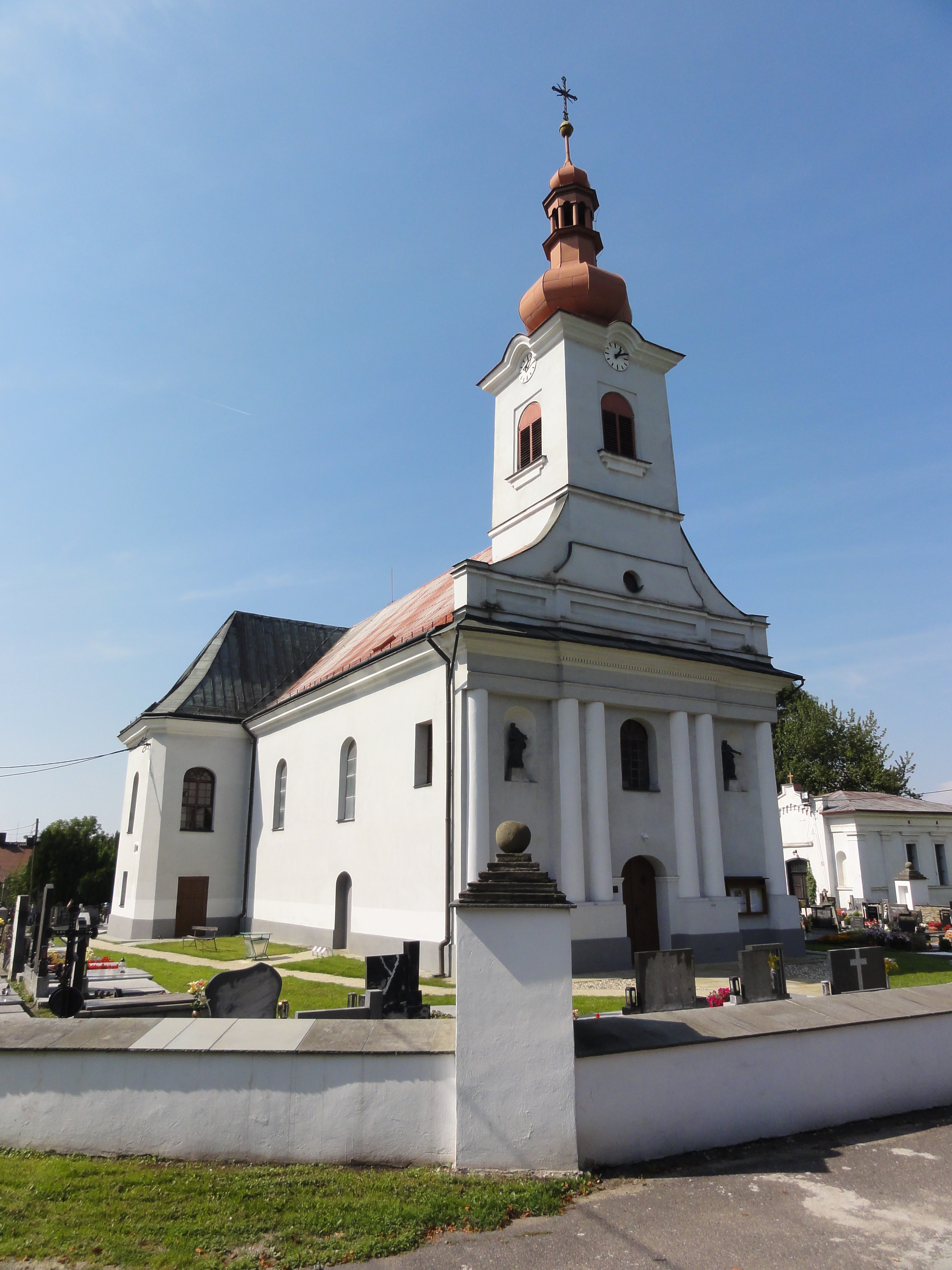
Church of the Assumption of the Virgin Mary

The main landmark in Hnojník is Hnojník Castle. The Baroque castle was rebuilt in the Empire style in the first half of the 19th century according to the plans of the architect Joseph Kornhäusel. After World War II, the castle was confiscated by the state. Part of the furniture and paintings and the library were relocated to Šternberk and Potštát. The castle became a property of the local administration, which converted the interior into offices and apartments. From 1966 to 1989, the castle was owned by a collective farm and slowly dilapidated. Since 1990, the castle was owned by various private individuals, but is unused and continues to dilapidate.

The second notable landmark is the Roman Catholic Church of the Assumption of the Virgin Mary. The initial wooden church was torn down and a new brick Empire one built in its place in 1808–1812.

The Beess family tomb is located on the Catholic cemetery next to the church. This rectangular building was built in the Empire style in the second half of the 19th century.

== Notable people ==
- Jan Kubisz (1848–1929), Polish educator and writer; taught and died here
- Adam Makowicz (born 1940), Polish jazz musician
