= Gwiazdka Cieszyńska =

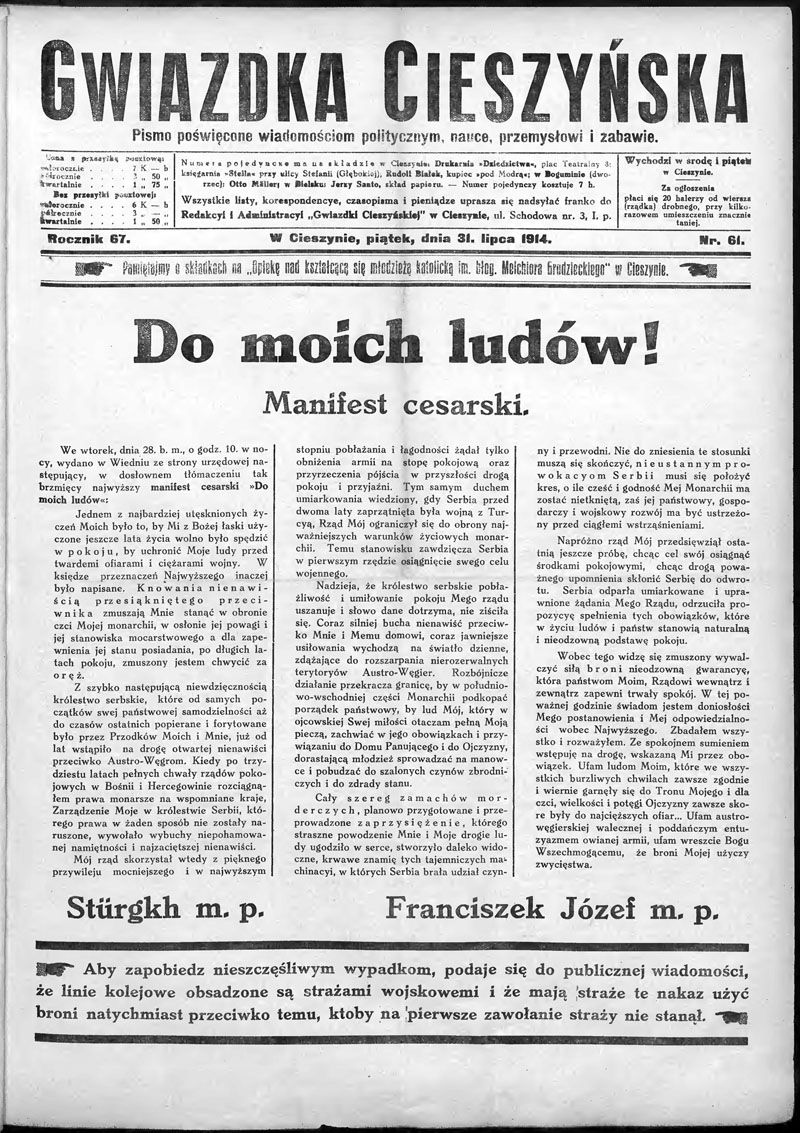
- Gwiazdka Cieszyńska from 31 July 1914, featuring the manifesto of Franz Joseph at the start of World War I
- Former editors: Paweł Stalmach (1851-1887); Józef Londzin (1890-1929)
- Categories: Magazine
- Frequency: Weekly; Biweekly (since 1906)
- First issue: 1 March 1851
- Final issue: 1939
- Country: Austrian Empire, Austria-Hungary, Poland
- Language: Polish

Gwiazdka Cieszyńska (Polish pronunciation: [ˈɡvjast.ka t͡ɕɛˈʂɘɲ.ska], Cieszyn Star) was a weekly Polish magazine published in Cieszyn (Teschen), Silesia in 1851-1939. After 1906 it appeared biweekly. It succeeded Tygodnik Cieszyński magazine which appeared in 1848-1851.

The magazine accented the Polishness of Silesia and aimed to enlighten and emancipate the people of Cieszyn Silesia, spread national consciousness among Poles and present Polish history and traditions. It however disavowed from the radical social slogans. During the absolutist Bach system of the 1850s-1860s of the Austrian Empire it was the only Polish magazine in Cieszyn Silesia. In the 1860s it had about 1,400 subscribers, 300 of whom lived in Silesia, 600 in Galicia.

From the 1880s Gwiazdka Cieszyńska presented almost exclusively Catholic views, that were related to the spiritual evolution of editor Paweł Stalmach, who on his deathbed converted to Catholicism. From 1888 it was financed by the Katolickie Towarzystwo Prasowe (Catholic Press Society).

Gwiazdka Cieszyńska later became the press expression of Związek Śląskich Katolików (ZŚlK, Association of Silesian Catholics), which in February 1923 merged with the Polish Christian Democratic Party. Before his death, editor Józef Londzin bequeathed the magazine together with all of its property to the Dziedzictwo Błogosławionego Jana Sarkandra (Heritage of Blessed Jan Sarkander). In 1927 the reactivated Związek Śląskich Katolików quarrelled with Dziedzictwo Błogosławionego Jana Sarkandra before the elections to the Silesian Sejm. In consequence the former (ZŚlK) lost its press association with Gwiazdka Cieszyńska. In 1930 the magazine adopted the Polish Christian Democratic stance.

Gwiazdka Cieszyńska also stood also against the influence of the socialist movement. Regional writers who contributed to the magazine included Andrzej Cinciała, Andrzej Kotula, Ernest Farnik, Emanuel Grim, Jan Kubisz and Oskar Zawisza.

== Editors ==
- 1851-1887: Paweł Stalmach
- 1889-1890: Andrzej Kusionowicz (afterwards Grodyński)
- 1890: Józef Londzin
- 1901-1902: Kazimierz Wróblewski
- 1902-1929: Józef Londzin
