= Tygodnik Cieszyński =

Polish magazine

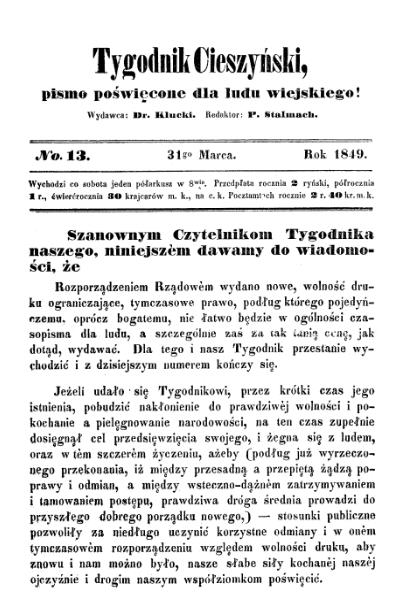
- Front page of Tygodnik Cieszyński, 31 March 1849
- Former editors: Andrzej Cinciała (1848); Paweł Stalmach (1848-1851)
- Categories: Magazine
- Frequency: Weekly
- Circulation: 500
- First issue: 6 May 1848
- Final issue: 15 February 1851
- Country: Austrian Empire
- Language: Polish

Tygodnik Cieszyński ("Cieszyn Weekly") was a weekly Polish magazine published in Cieszyn (Teschen) in 1848–1851. It was the first local magazine in Cieszyn Silesia, and the oldest Polish magazine in Cieszyn Silesia.

The first issue appeared on 6 May 1848. The publisher was Ludwik Klucki, first editor was Andrzej Cinciała, who was in August replaced by Paweł Stalmach. The first article of the first issue of Tygodnik Cieszyński began with words:

The black cloud, which through the centuries overshadowed the light sky, cracked. The sun of freedom sparkled and horrible darkness disappears.

— Tygodnik Cieszyński, 6 May 1848,

Stalmach aimed to enlighten and emancipate the people of Cieszyn Silesia and to spread national consciousness among Poles. He however adopted the austroslavist stances to avoid the conflict with the Habsburg monarchy.

In 1849 Baron Alexander von Bach became the Minister of the Interior of the Austrian Empire and began to implement absolutist policies, including reducing the freedom of the press. Tygodnik Cieszyński suffered from new Austrian policies and the last issue appeared on 15 February 1851. The magazine was transformed into Gwiazdka Cieszyńska which appeared from 1851 to 1939.
