= Bolesław Kotula =

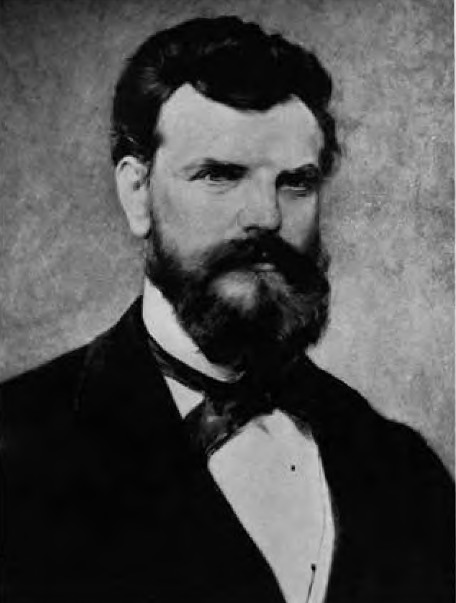

Bolesław Kotula (27 October 1849 – 19 August 1898) was a Polish naturalist and teacher. He made extensive studies of the flora and fauna of the Przemyśl area and contributed especially to knowledge of the plant and mollusc distributions in the Carpathians.

== Life and work ==
Kotula was born in Cieszyn, the son of Andrzej Kotula and Anna née Tetla. He had siblings: Jerzy, Ludmiła Anna, Ludomir, and Rudolf. He also had a half-sister, Emilia, from his mother's first marriage. After graduating from secondary school in Cieszyn in 1868 he went to the University of Vienna and studied medicine before transferring to physics. In 1871 he was a student at the Jagiellonian University where he graduated the next year. He worked as an assistant to Maksymilian Nowicki. He moved to Przemyśl in 1875 as a teacher of mathematics and natural history at the junior high school. Here he worked until 1888, inculcating an interest in the natural sciences among his students. He collected plant specimens in the region and donated 4002 herbarium sheets in 1878 collected mainly from the Przemyśl area. He collaborated with Professor Nowicki who had worked on beetles in the museum of the Dzieduszycki family. In 1888 he donated another collection with material from the upper San and Striąź region. He suffered from neurasthenia and went to European sanatoriums including to Baltimore in the US and England from where he returned in 1891. He died during a botanical expedition to the Geisterspitze in the Alps along with his brother Andrzej. Unable to afford a guide they travelled carelessly and he slipped through thin ice and fell into a crevasse in the Ebenferner glacier.

Kotula made studies on the altitudinal distributions of plants and snails in the Tatra mountains. A species of snail is named after him as Hessemilimax kotulae (Westerlund, 1883) which was originally described with the wrong Latin gender ending as Semilimax kotulai.
