= Jan Kubisz =

Polish educator and poet (1848-1929)

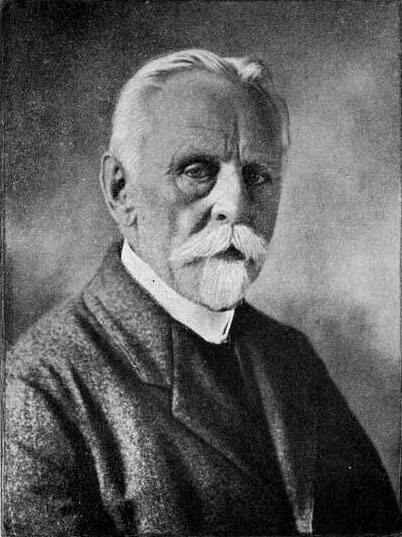
- Jan Kubisz
- Born: 24 January 1848; Końska, Austrian Empire
- Died: 25 March 1929 (aged 81); Hnojník, Czechoslovakia
- Citizenship: Austrian, Czechoslovak
- Occupations: Educator and writer
- Children: Tadeusz, photographer Jan, surgeon Karol, pastor Andrzej, co-founder of Głos Ludu
- Writing career
- Notable works: Płyniesz Olzo po dolinie, Pamiętnik starego nauczyciela

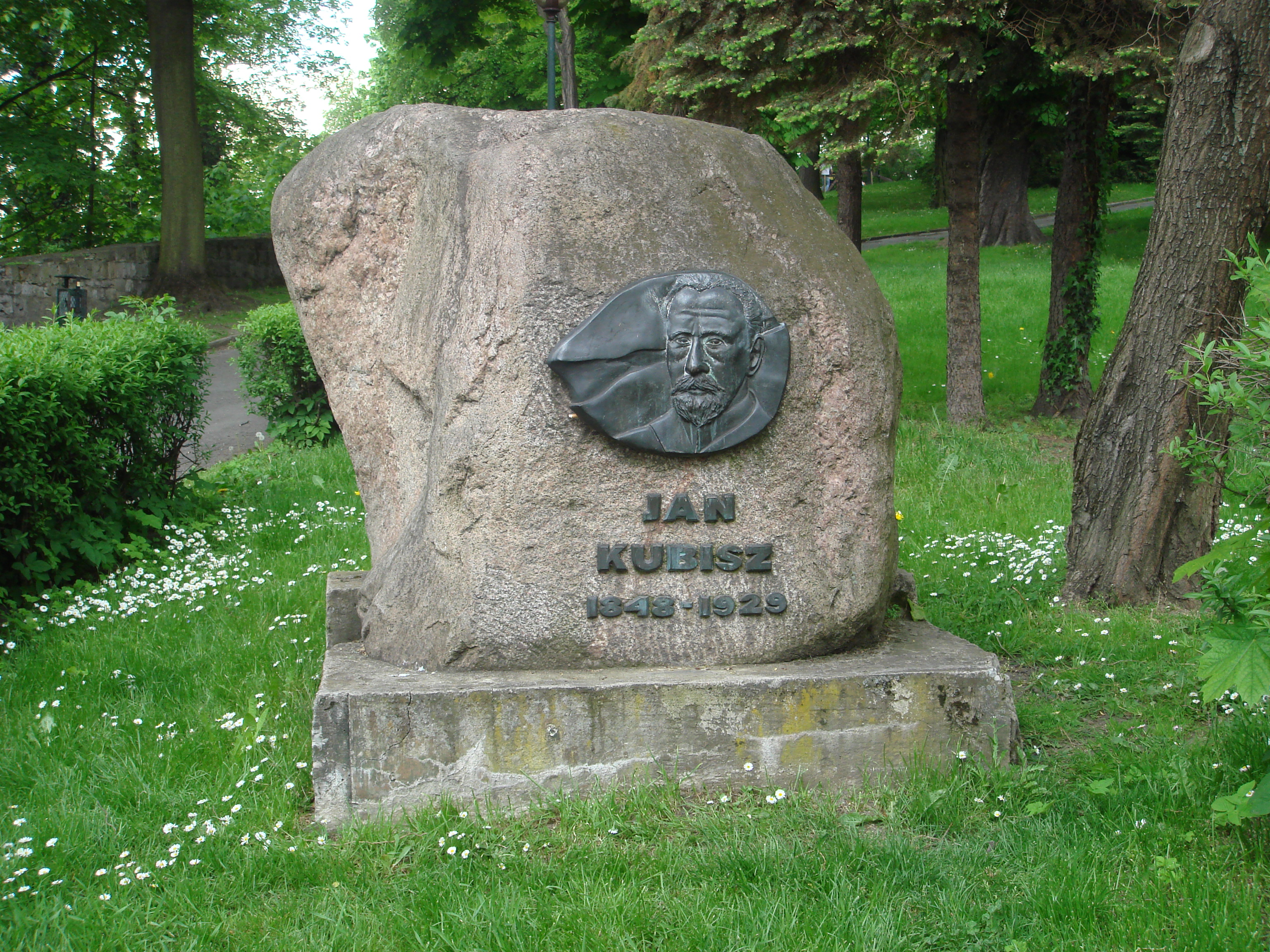
Jan Kubisz memorial at Castle Hill Park in Cieszyn

Jan Kubisz (24 January 1848 – 25 March 1929) was a Polish educator and poet from the region of Cieszyn Silesia. His poem Płyniesz Olzo po dolinie (You Flow, Olza, Down the Valley), centered on the Olza River, became unofficial anthem of Cieszyn Silesia, especially Poles in Trans-Olza.

== Biography ==
Jan Kubisz was born 24 January 1848 in Końska, Austrian Empire. Kubisz attended primaryschool in Końska and Protestant gymnasium in Cieszyn in 1860–1865 where he was taught in German since were no Polish-language high schools in the region at time of his youth. Kubisz later graduated from a teachers' seminary in Cieszyn and in 1869 began teaching at Polish school in Gnojnik at the age of 21. Kubisz lived at the school for the next 41 years. In 1910, Kubisz built his own house in the village, which remains an important landmark. During his work as a teacher, Kubisz remained active in several Polish organizations.

At the age of 20 in 1868, Kubisz published his first poem, which appeared in the Gwiazdka Cieszyńska weekly magazine. In 1882, Kubisz published Niezapominajka under pen name Szlązak. The Niezapominajka poetry collection focused mainly on national issues and glorified Cieszyn Silesia and customs of local people. In 1889 another poetry collection, Śpiewy starego Jakuba appeared. This collection focused on the social and national issues of his region. Poem Nad Olzą (On the Olza), later known as Płyniesz Olzo po dolinie (You Flow, Olza, Down the Valley) which is a part of this collection later became unofficial anthem of Cieszyn Silesia.

Kubisz also published his works in the Cieszyn press. In 1902 a large poetry book Z niwy śląskiej was published in Lwów thanks to Kubisz's friends. Kubisz's most acclaimed work, Pamiętnik starego nauczyciela (Diary of Old Teacher), was published in 1928 on the eve of Kubisz's life. The work describes the life and customs of the Cieszyn Silesia people at the end of 19th century and Kubisz's experiences as a teacher. Pamiętnik starego nauczyciela continues to be an important work used by historians, ethnographers and linguists.

Two years before Kubisz's death on 25 March 1929 in Hnojník, Czechoslovakia, Pastor Andrzej Buzek said of Kubisz:

He belongs to people who lived public life, to the generation who most ardently felt all jolts of the Polish national life in the former Duchy of Cieszyn. In the church affairs he is one of those who lied down his heart on the altar of Polish-Evangelic idea, in the footsteps of the resurrector of Polish Protestantism, Rev. Dr. Leopold Otto.

— Pastor Andrzej Buzek, December 1927

Kubisz is remembered on both sides of Cieszyn Silesia. In Końska, there is a monument erected in 1968 in his birthplace. Another memorial, built in 1988, is located at Castle Hill Park in Cieszyn. There is also a street and a gymnasium named after him in Cieszyn and Polish primary school in Hnojník is also named after Kubisz.

== Works ==
- Niezapominajka (1882) – poetry collection
- Śpiewy starego Jakuba (1889) – poetry collection
- Z niwy śląskiej (1902) – poetry collection
- Pamiętnik starego nauczyciela (1928) – diary
