= Hradiště (Těrlicko) =

Coordinates: 49°44′14″N 18°31′25″E

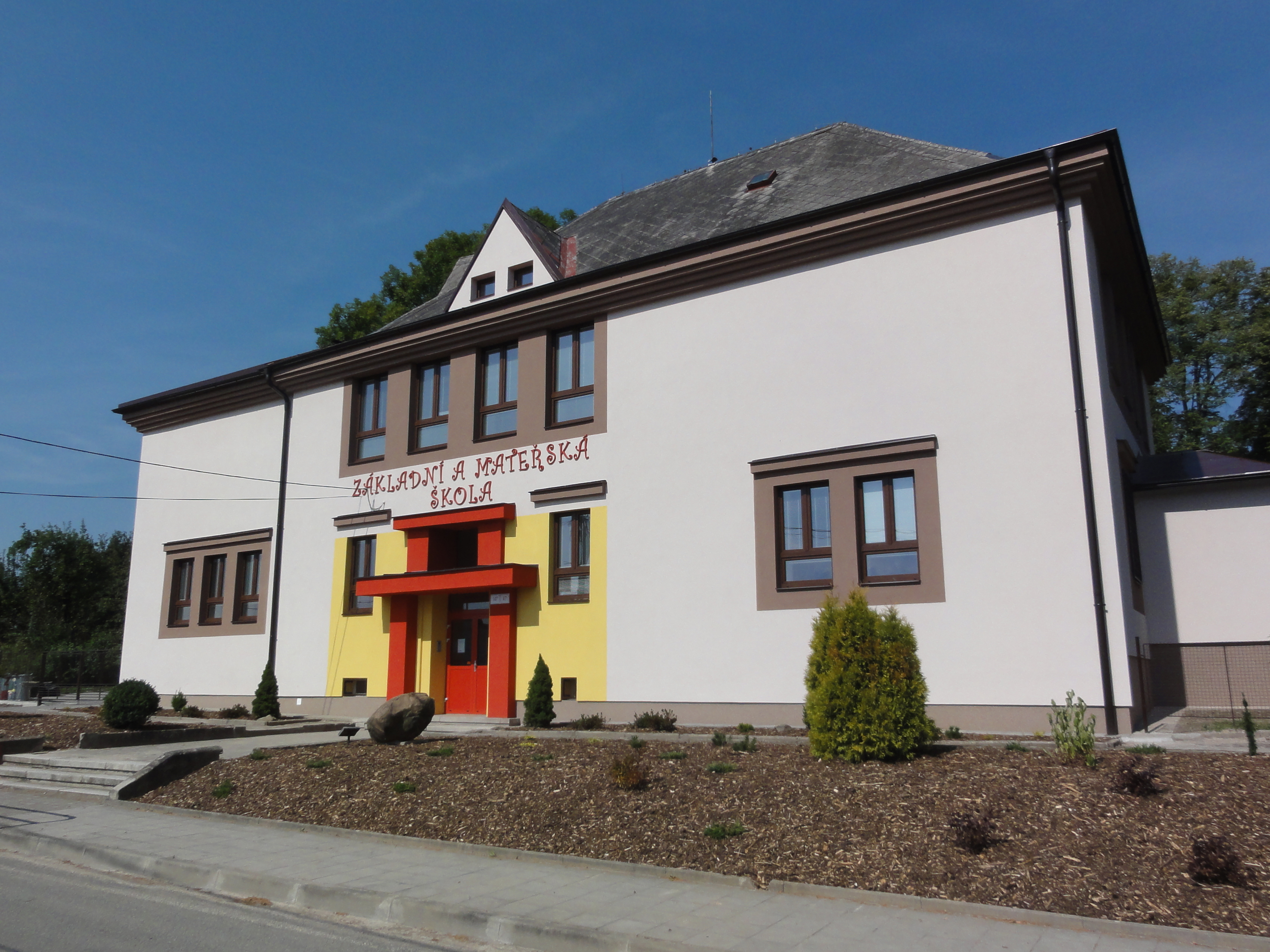
Kindergarten and elementary school

Hradiště (Polish: Grodziszcz or Grodziszcze, German: Grodischt), also known as Hradiště pod Babí horou, is a village in Karviná District, Moravian-Silesian Region, Czech Republic. It was a separate municipality but became administratively a part of Těrlicko in 1975. It has a population of around 830 and a territory of 781,1 ha. It lies in the historical region of Cieszyn Silesia.

== History ==
The village was indirectly attested in a Latin document of Diocese of Wrocław called Liber fundationis episcopatus Vratislaviensis from around 1305 which mentioned Grodische villa Snessonis. However it was written in an atypical form and suggests that a village was older. There should be another village named similarly, and even older from Snesson's village. Because Grodische villa Snessonis was listed among villages located between Skoczów and Czechowice it is undoubtedly linked to nowadays Grodziec, whereas the other Grodische, not mentioned in Liber fundationis... is associated with Grodziszcz, in Czech Hradiště, now part of Těrlicko in the Czech Republic. As in the case of the other Grodische the name suggests that there existed a fortificated wooden gord. Thus it could have existed earlier in 13th century within Duchy of Opole and Racibórz and Castellany of Cieszyn, which was in 1290 in the process of feudal fragmentation of Poland transformed into the Duchy of Teschen, ruled by a local branch of Piast dynasty. In 1327 the duchy became a fee of Kingdom of Bohemia, which after 1526 became part of the Habsburg monarchy. Later it was mentioned as Hradysscze (1447, 1450), Hradisstie (1520), Hradisscze (1523), Grodisscze (1607) and similarly but losing the ending -e (e.g. Grodischtz, 1736, 1804).

After Revolutions of 1848 in the Austrian Empire a modern municipal division was introduced in the re-established Austrian Silesia. The village as a municipality was subscribed to the political and legal district of Cieszyn. According to the censuses conducted in 1880, 1890, 1900 and 1910 the population of the municipality dropped from 843 in 1880 to 785 in 1910 with a majority being native Polish-speakers (between 97.2% and 99.9%) accompanied by a German-speaking people (at most 13 or 1.7% in 1910) and Czech-speaking (at most 8 or 1.1% in 1910). In terms of religion in 1910 the majority were Protestants (50.7%), followed by Roman Catholics (47.1%), Jews (8 or 1%) and 9 people adhering to another faiths.

After World War I, fall of Austria-Hungary, Polish–Czechoslovak War and the division of Cieszyn Silesia in 1920, it became a part of Czechoslovakia. Following the Munich Agreement, in October 1938 together with the Zaolzie region it was annexed by Poland, administratively adjoined to Cieszyn County of Silesian Voivodeship. It was then annexed by Nazi Germany at the beginning of World War II. After the war it was restored to Czechoslovakia.
