= Osmo Kontula =

Finnish sociologist and sexologist (born 1951)

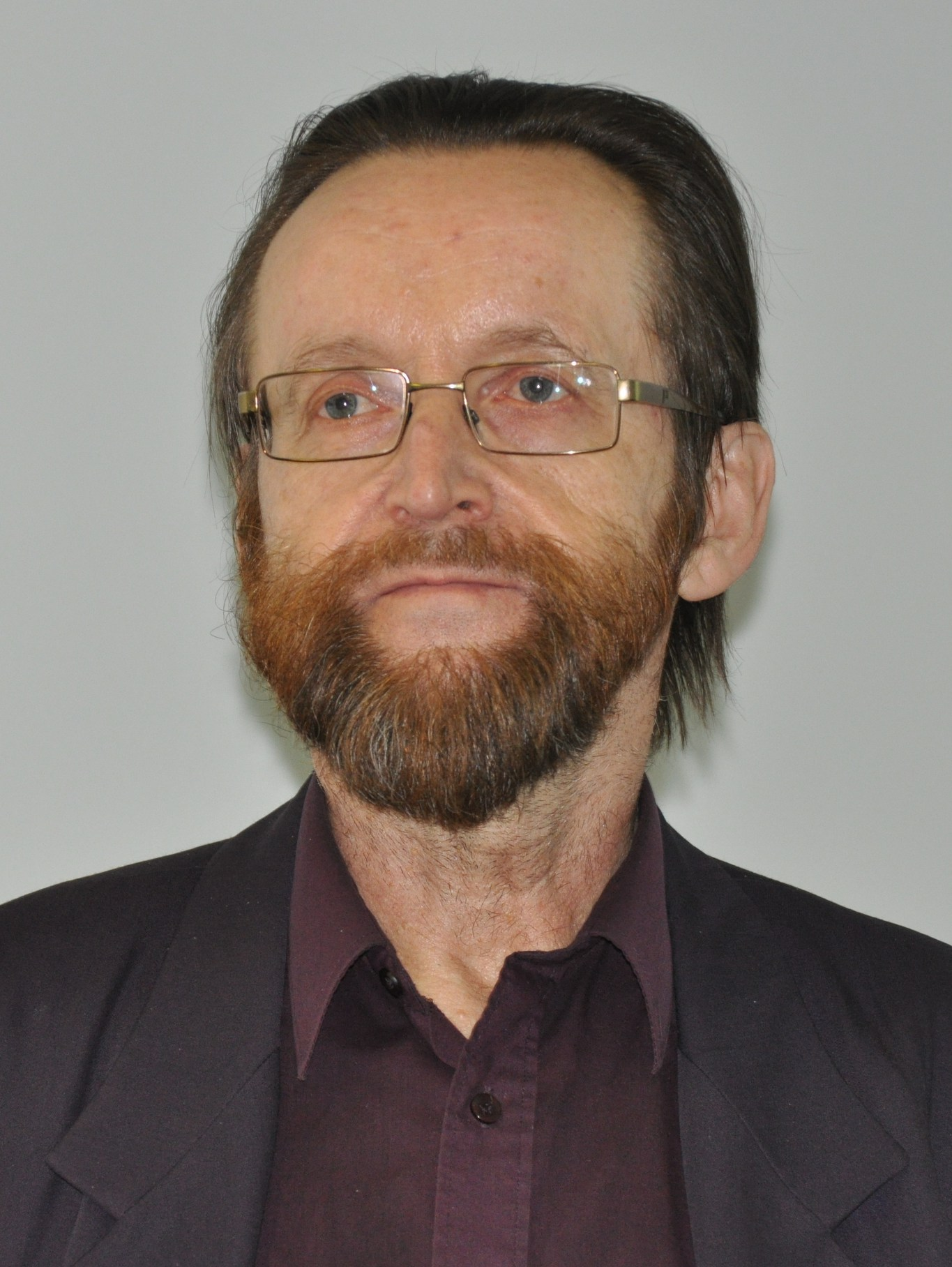
Osmo Kontula in 2012.

Osmo Johannes Kontula (born 27 June 1951) is a Finnish sociologist and sexologist currently employed as a research professor at the Population Research Institute of the Family Federation of Finland (Väestöliitto). He is also honorary associate professor at the Faculty of Health Science, University of Sydney, Australia.

Kontula is specialised in sex research and sexual science and has authored some 300 publications, of which more than 50 are books authored or edited by him. His research topics have included national and international trends in sexual values and patterns and sexual life styles, sexual relationships, sexual initiation, teenage sexual health, and sex education.
