= RWD 5 =

Polish touring and sports plane of 1931

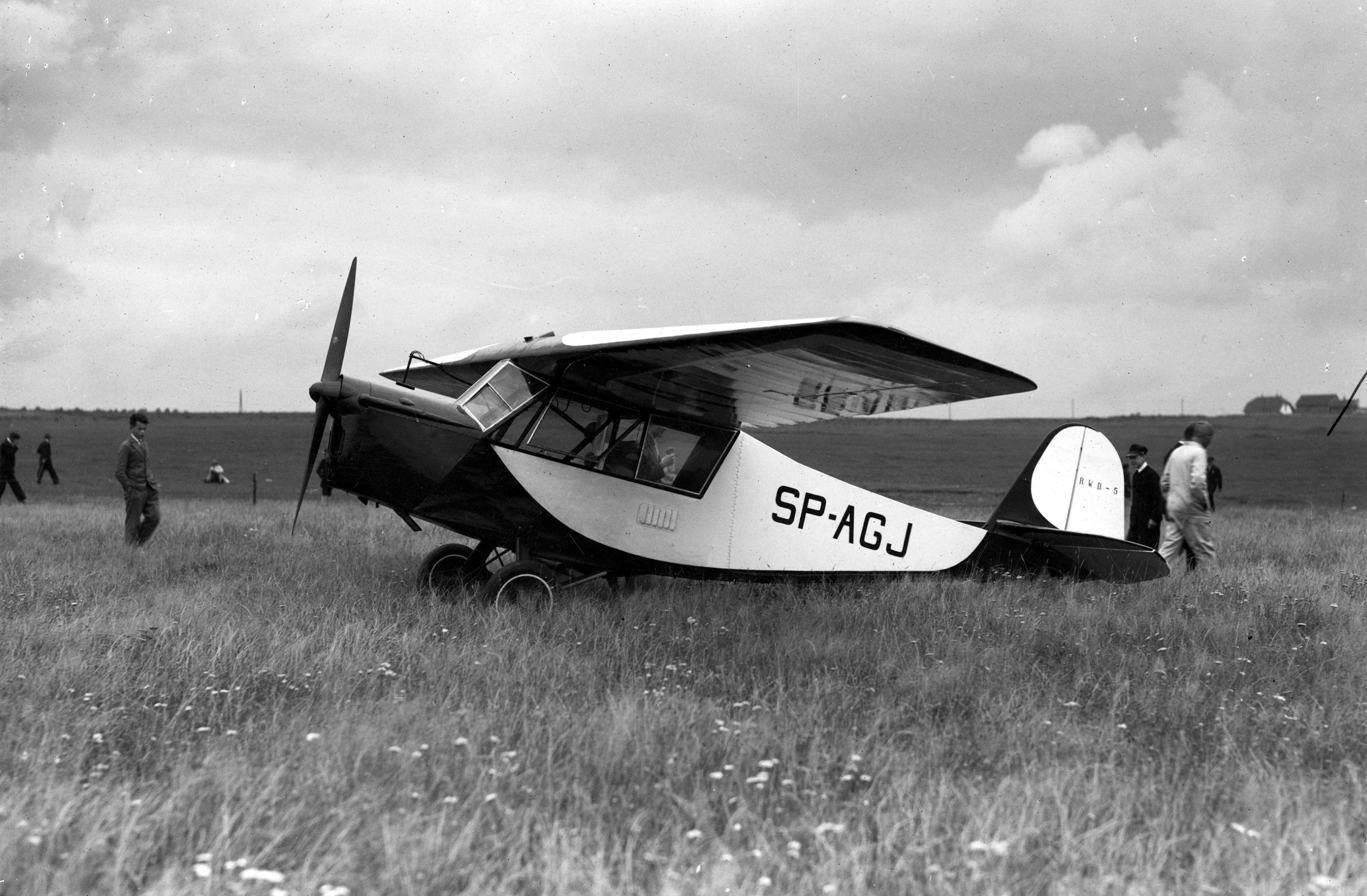
- RWD 5 SP-AGJ

General information
- Type: Sports plane
- Manufacturer: DWL
- Designer: RWD team
- Primary user: Poland
- Number built: 20

History
- Manufactured: 1931–1937
- Introduction date: 1931
- First flight: 7 August 1931
- Retired: 1939

The RWD 5 was a Polish touring and sports plane of 1931, a two-seat high-wing monoplane, constructed by the RWD team. It was made famous by its transatlantic flight, being the smallest aircraft to cross the Atlantic.

== Development ==
The RWD 5 was constructed by the RWD team of Stanisław Rogalski, Stanisław Wigura and Jerzy Drzewiecki (their designs were named RWD after their initial letters). It was a further development of earlier RWD aircraft series (RWD 1, RWD 2, RWD 3 and RWD 7), especially of its direct predecessor, the RWD 4. It shared the same wing shape and construction, while the fuselage was totally new, constructed of steel frame, unlike its wooden predecessors. The fuselage had a modern shape and a closed canopy with panoramic windows (earlier models had atypical fish-shaped fuselages with no direct forward view from the pilot's seat).

The first prototype (registration SP-AGJ) was flown on 7 August 1931 by its designer Jerzy Drzewiecki. It was built in new workshops of Warsaw University of Technology near Okęcie airport, from 1933 converted to Doświadczalne Warsztaty Lotnicze (DWL) company.

After successes of the prototype in air competitions, a small-scale series production was set up, mostly for the Polish Aero Club. Series aircraft had improved landing gear. Two were built in 1932 (registration SP-AJA and AJB), five in 1933 (including the single-seater RWD 5bis), eleven in 1934 (including one in Aero Club workshops in Lublin) and one more in 1937 (SP-BGX), for a total of 20 aircraft. In 1932, the RWD 5 was shown at the International Air Show in Paris.

== Service ==
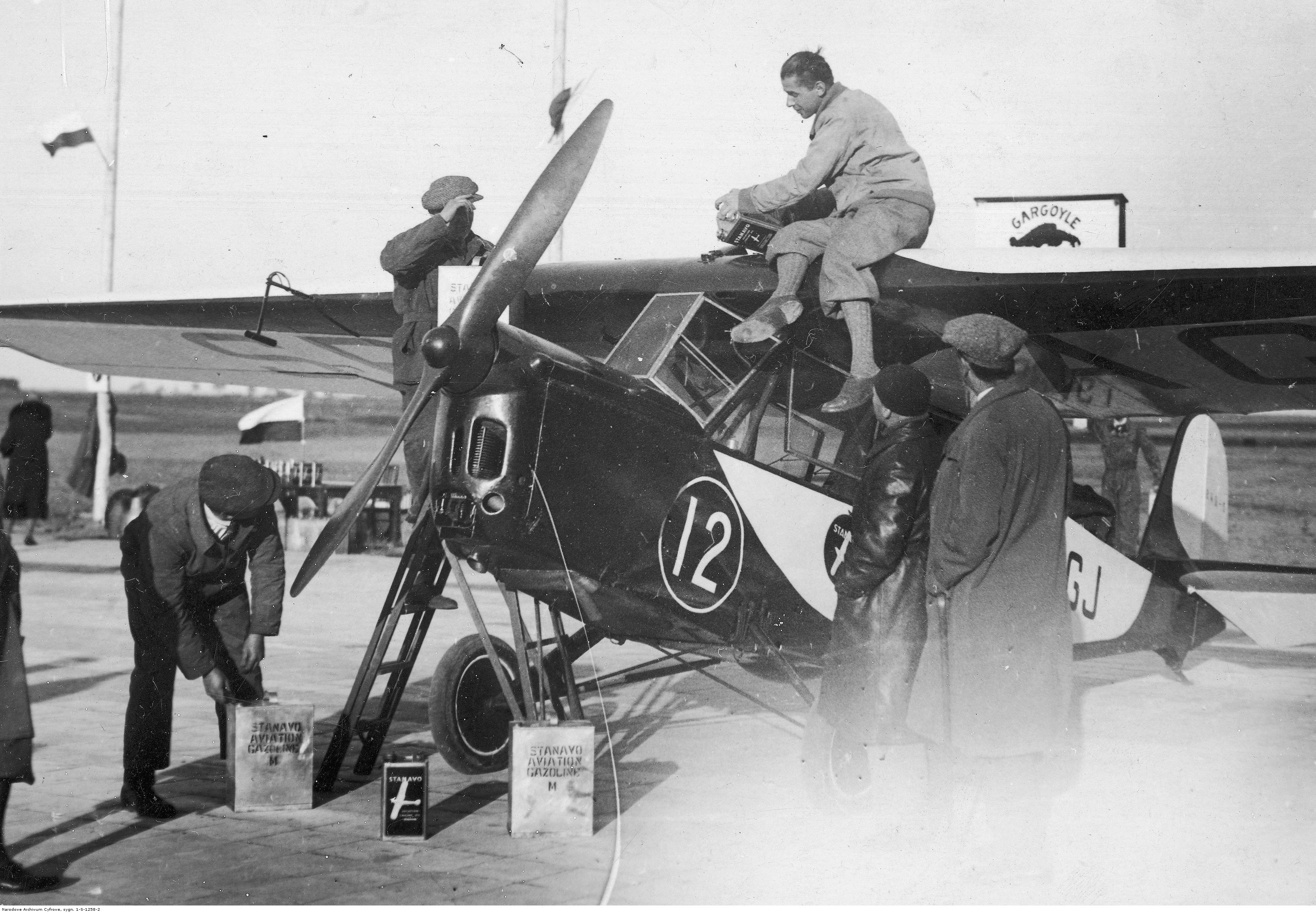
Refuelling during 4th Domestic Touring Aircraft Contest

RWD 5s were mostly used as trainers and sport planes by Polish regional aero clubs. They scored good results in local competitions, starting from 1931, when the prototype won the 3rd South-Western Poland Flight (pilot M. Pronaszko) and the 4th Domestic Touring Aircraft Contest (pilot Franciszek Żwirko). As sport and touring planes, they were later superseded by the RWD 13, and were relegated mostly for training. Three were written off before 1939.

One aircraft was used by LOT Polish Airlines in 1933–1936 for taxi flights (registration SP-LOT), one by LOPP organization (SP-LOP). After the outbreak of World War II, during the Polish September Campaign, at least three RWD 5 were utilized as liaison aircraft by the Polish Air Force (SP-ALR, ALX, ALZ). Also, Maj. E. Wyrwicki flew RWD 5 from Romania to besieged Warsaw (according to other sources, he flew RWD-5 SP-AJB from Warsaw). None of the RWD 5s survived the war.

One RWD 5 was sold to Brazil in 1938 (former SP-LO, removed from the Polish registry on 4 December 1936) and registered there as PP-TDX in 1939. Its airworthiness expired in 1943.

In late 1990s, a flying replica of the RWD 5, named RWD 5R, was built in Poland by EEA991 association. It flew first on 26 August 2000, and is powered with 140 hp LOM Praha Avia M-332 engine (registration SP-LOT).

== The flight across the Atlantic ==
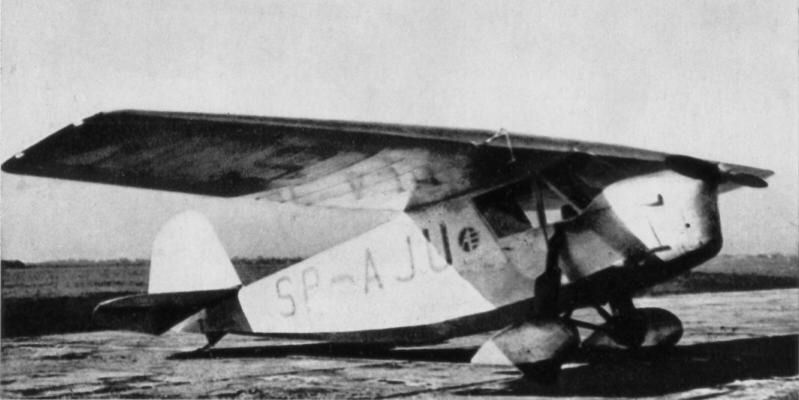
Single-seater record version RWD 5bis SP-AJU

In March 1933 a special single-seater variant was built, called RWD 5bis (registration SP-AJU), powered with a 130 hp Gipsy Major engine. The rear cabin was replaced with an additional 300 L (79 US gal) fuel tank, and the windows were removed. Additional fuel tanks were added in wings, the fuel capacity reached 752 L (199 US gal) in total and the range increased to 5,000 km (3,100 mi). Stanisław Skarżyński flew this plane from Warsaw to Rio de Janeiro from 27 April to 24 June 1933, on a path of 17,885 km (11,113 mi).

During his travel, on 7 May/8 May, Skarżynski flew the RWD 5bis across the southern Atlantic, from Saint-Louis, Senegal to Maceio in Brazil. The flight took 20 hours 30 minutes (17 hours above the ocean). He crossed 3,582 km (2,226 mi), establishing a distance record in the FAI light tourist plane class. The RWD 5bis was at that time the smallest plane that had ever flown across the Atlantic — its empty weight was below 450 kg (1000 lb), loaded 1100 kg (2425 lb). The plane had no radio nor safety equipment, due to weight considerations. It returned to Europe on a ship. After its record-breaking flight, the RWD 5bis was converted to a two-seater variant without additional tanks, and used by Skarżyński. The SP-AJU was seized by the Soviets in Lwów in September 1939, after their invasion of Poland.

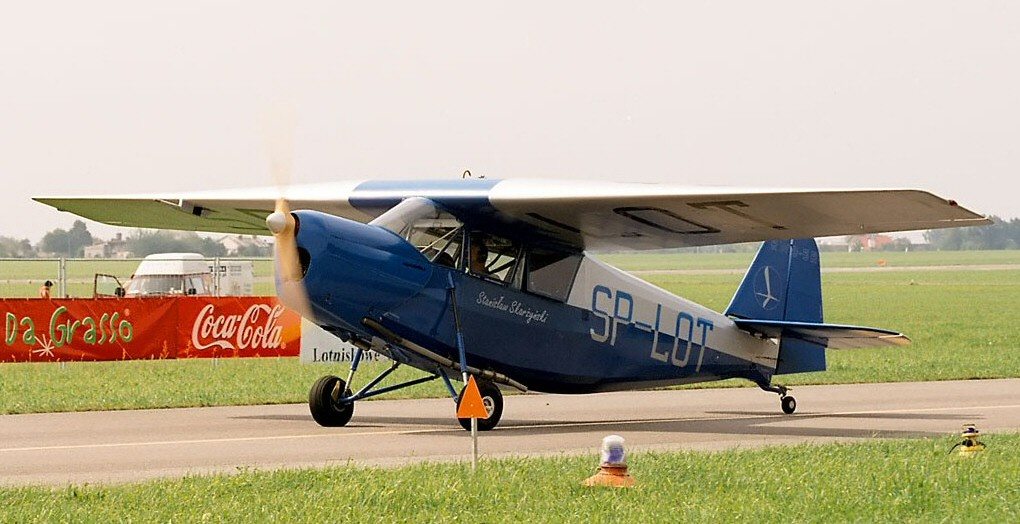
Modern replica

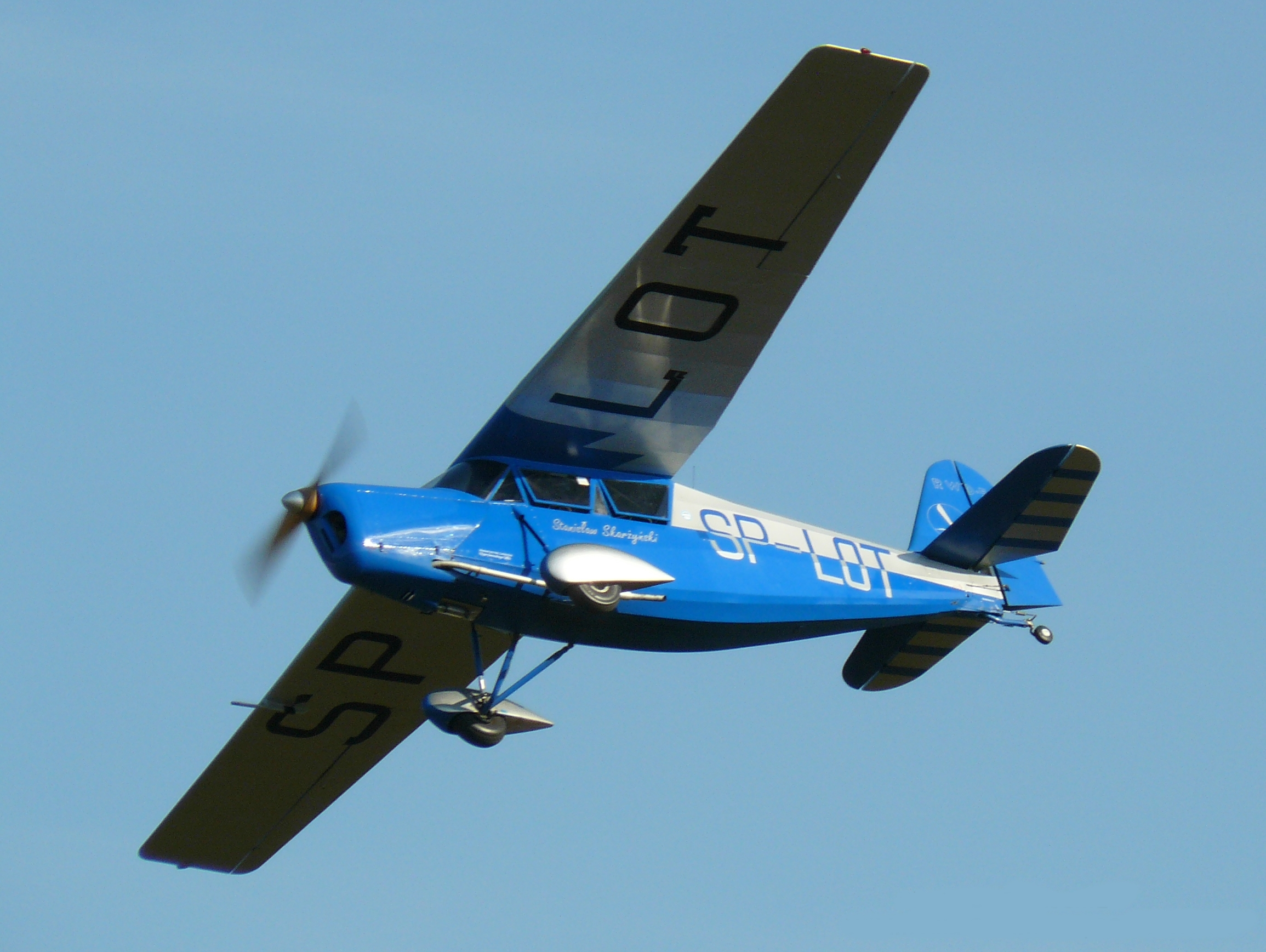
Replica in flight

== Description ==
Mixed construction (steel and wood) high-wing cantilever monoplane, conventional in layout. The fuselage of a steel frame, covered with canvas on a wooden frame (with duralumin in engine section). Trapezoid one-part wing, canvas covered (plywood in front), two-spar, with no mechanization. A crew of two, sitting in tandem in a glazed cockpit, with dual controls and individual doors on the right. Conventional fixed landing gear, with a rear skid, wheels in teardrop covers on serial aircraft.

Engine in front, with tractor two-blade wooden propeller of a fixed pitch. A variety of 4-cylinder air-cooled inverted straight engines were used, most typically Cirrus Hermes IIB (105 hp (78 kW) nominal power and 115 hp (86 kW) take-off power). Used also were 130 hp Hermes IV or de Havilland Gipsy III, or 120 hp Walter Junior 4. The RWD 5bis and RWD 5 SP-LOT had a 130 hp (97 kW) de Havilland Gipsy Major.

== Specifications (RWD 5) ==
Data from , Polskie konstrukcje lotnicze 1893–1939

General characteristics

- Crew: 1
- Capacity: 1 passenger / trainee or second pilot
- Length: 7.2 m (23 ft 7 in)
- Wingspan: 10.5 m (34 ft 5 in)
- Height: 2.7 m (8 ft 10 in)
- Wing area: 15.5 m^{2} (167 sq ft)
- Empty weight: 445 kg (981 lb)
- Gross weight: 760 kg (1,676 lb)
- Fuel capacity: 22 L (5.8 US gal; 4.8 imp gal) in two wing tanks
- Powerplant: 1 × Cirrus Hermes IIB 4-cylinder air-cooled in-line piston engines, 78–86 kW (105–115 hp)
- Propellers: 2-bladed fixed-pitch propeller

Performance

- Maximum speed: 200–210 km/h (120–130 mph, 110–110 kn) at sea level
- Cruise speed: 175–185 km/h (109–115 mph, 94–100 kn)
- Landing speed: 75 km/h (47 mph; 40 kn)
- Range: 1,080–1,200 km (670–750 mi, 580–650 nmi)
- Service ceiling: 4,700–5,000 m (15,400–16,400 ft)
- Rate of climb: 4.6 m/s (910 ft/min)
- Time to altitude: 1,000 m (3,300 ft) in 4 minutes 20 seconds
- Wing loading: 50.7 kg/m^{2} (10.4 lb/sq ft)
- Power/mass: 0.1126 kW/kg (0.0685 hp/lb)

== See also ==
Related development

- RWD 4

Aircraft of comparable role, configuration, and era

- de Havilland Puss Moth
