= Rogalski and Wigura R.W.1 =

R.W.1
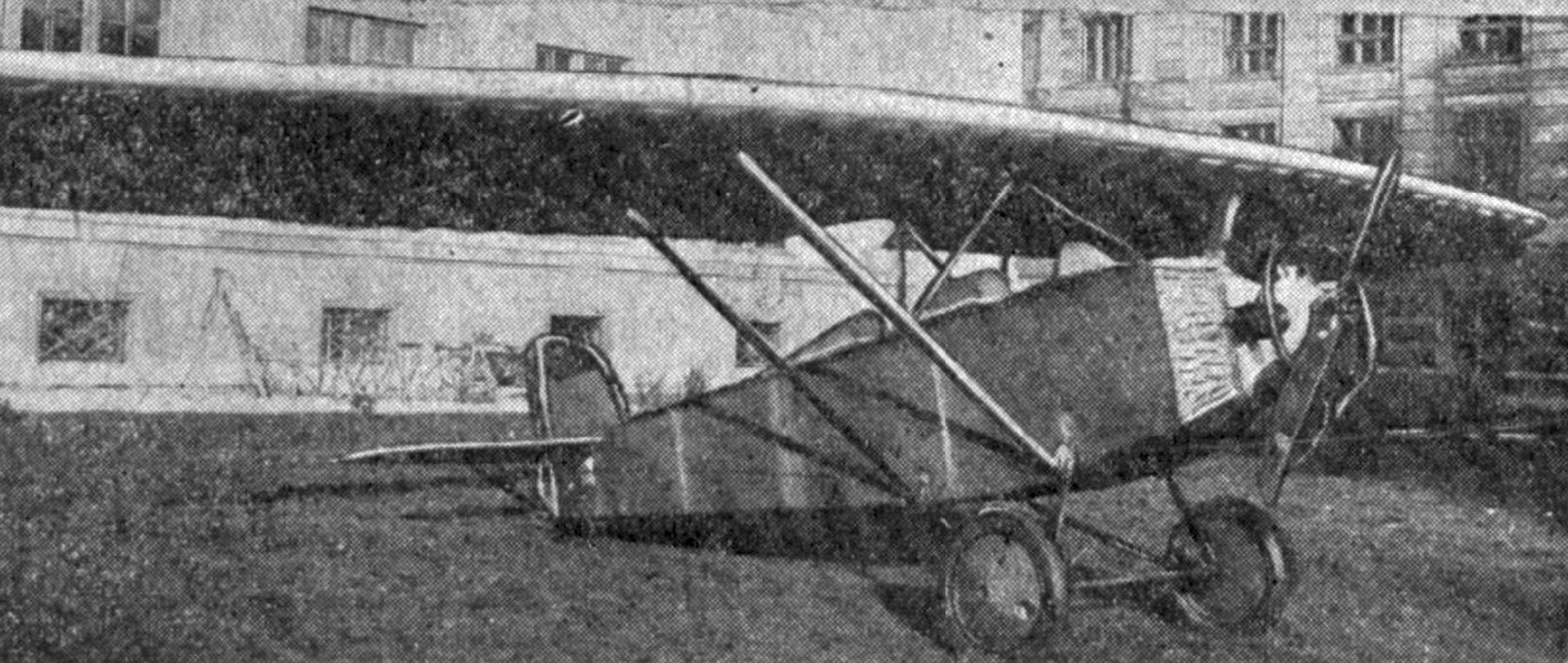

General information
- Type: Light aircraft
- National origin: Poland
- Designer: Stanislaw Rogalski and Stanislaw Wigura
- Number built: 1

History
- First flight: September 1927
- Retired: 1928

The Rogalski and Wigura R.W.1 was designed and built by a pair of students at Warsaw Technical University in 1927. The single example was a two-seat parasol-wing monoplane which entered two national competitions, served the Warsaw Academic Aeroclub and also towed an advertising banner.

== Design and development ==
The Seckja Lotnicza (SL) or Aeronautical Section of Warsaw Technical University, set up in 1916 by Ryszard Bartel and revived in 1921, played a significant part in the growth of Polish club flying. The 1925 Drzewiecki JD-2 was the first of their powered aircraft designs to be built and the second, designed by SL members Stanislaw Rogalski and Stanislaw Wigura, was the R.W.1. Its construction in the SL workshop was funded by LOPP and they were helped by staff from the factory of E. Plage and T. Laśkiewicz.

Its parasol wing was trapezoidal in plan and had an aerodynamically semi-thick section. It was built in two parts, each based on two spars. In front of the forward spar the wing was plywood-covered, with fabric aft. The two halves were joined centrally and held over the fuselage on a pair of transverse inverted-V cabane struts. On each side a pair of parallel struts from the spars to the lower fuselage longeron provided the primary wing bracing.

The R.W.1 was powered by a 45 hp (34 kW) Anzani 6 six-cylinder radial engine. Fuel tanks, together holding 70 L (15 imp gal; 18 US gal), were in the wing roots. Behind the engine fire wall the simple fuselage had a tapered, rectangular section, built around four longerons and frames and ply covered. It contained two open cockpits in tandem under the wing, fitted with dual control. The empennage was conventional with its tailplane mounted on top of the fuselage and with a rounded vertical tail. The tail surfaces were built in a similar way to the wings and the rear control surfaces, like the ailerons, were unbalanced.

The mainwheels of its fixed landing gear were on a single axle with rubber shock absorbers at each end and supported by steel V-struts from the lower longerons. There was a tailskid under the fin.

It flew for the first time in about September 1927.

== Operational history ==
Very soon after its first flight the R.W.1 competed in the First National Lightplane Contest, held in Warsaw in early October 1927. During this event the Anzani engine, which had a history of unreliability, failed, and the airframe was damaged in the subsequent emergency landing. After repair it was used by the Warsaw Academic Aeroclub.

In 1928 it generated some revenue for the club by acting as an air-advertisement tug for a coffee firm. In late October it took part in the Second National Lightplane Contest, again held at Warsaw. It qualified in twelfth place, but a take-off accident broke off the rear fuselage, after which the R.W.1 did not fly again.

Its designers teamed up with Jerzy Drzewiecki, another Warsaw student, and some twenty-two designs were built under the joint RWD acronym.

== Specifications ==
Data from Cynk (1971)

General characteristics

- Crew: One pilot
- Capacity: One passenger
- Length: 5.9 m (19 ft 4 in)
- Wingspan: 10.1 m (33 ft 2 in)
- Height: 2.6 m (8 ft 6 in)
- Wing area: 15.3 m^{2} (165 sq ft)
- Empty weight: 300 kg (661 lb)
- Gross weight: 465 kg (1,025 lb)
- Fuel capacity: 70 L (15 imp gal; 18 US gal)
- Powerplant: 1 × Anzani 6 6-cylinder radial, 34 kW (45 hp)
- Propellers: 2-bladed

Performance

- Maximum speed: 120 km/h (75 mph, 65 kn)
- Landing speed: 65 km/h (40 mph; 35 kn)
