= RWD 15 =

Polish touring aircraft of 1937

RWD-15
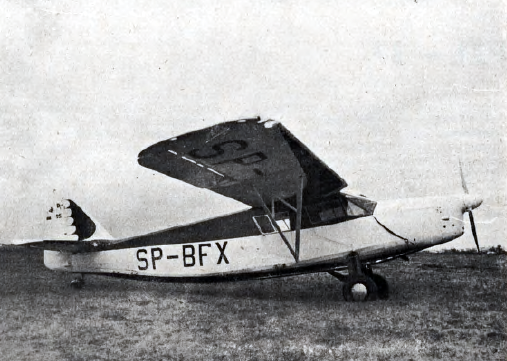

General information
- Type: Touring aircraft
- Manufacturer: DWL
- Designer: RWD team
- Primary users: Poland Romania; British Mandate of Palestine
- Number built: 5+1 prototype

History
- Manufactured: 1939
- First flight: 1937
- Developed from: RWD-13

The RWD-15 was a Polish touring aircraft of 1937, designed by the RWD team and built by the Doświadczalne Warsztaty Lotnicze (DWL).

== Design and development ==
The RWD-15 was an enlarged development of the RWD-13 three-seat touring aircraft, designed by Stanisław Rogalski of the RWD team, in the DWL workshops in Warsaw. The prototype first flew in spring 1937 (registration SP-BFX). It inherited RWD-13's advantages, like ease of flying, with good stability. In 1939, five aircraft were produced by the outbreak of World War II. A series of 10 RWD-15 was ordered by the Polish Air Force as liaison aircraft in 1939, but they were not completed before the war. Only one of five ordered air ambulances RWD-15S, with two stretchers, were built. There was proposed an aerial photography variant, but it was not built.

== Description ==
Five-seater touring strutted high-wing monoplane of mixed construction. Fuselage frame was metal, covered with canvas, the engine section covered with aluminium sheets. A two-spar rectangular wing was of wooden construction, covered with canvas and plywood leading edges, supported by V-struts. Wings were rearwards folding, and were equipped with automatic slats. Cantilever wooden tail unit, covered with plywood (stabilizers) and canvas (rudder and elevators). The cabin was enclosed, with two front seats fitted with dual controls, and behind them a bench with three seats. The cabin had a single door on the left and a pair of doors on the right side, with two luggage compartments at the rear. Engine at the front - 205 hp de Havilland Gipsy Six II, with a two-blade metal tractor propeller (DH Hamilton 1000) of variable pitch, 2.28 m diameter. Conventional fixed landing gear, with a tail-wheel.

== Operational history ==
All RWD-15 were initially used in Poland. Two aircraft were formally subordinated to the Polish Air Force (the 1st Aviation Regiment in Warsaw) - one bought by the Presidential Chancellory and belonging to the Staff Escadrille, and the other in air ambulance variants RWD-15S. One aircraft (registration SP-KAT) was completed as a long-range variant, with fuel tanks in place of rear seats, owned by the LOPP paramilitary organization. It was planned to fly it to Australia in marketing goals, with Maj. Stanisław Karpiński, but the plans were suspended after the German invasion of Czechoslovakia in March 1939. In some publications it is designated RWD-15bis. Last RWD-15 was made in August 1939, with civil registration SP-ALA.

In 1939, the prototype RWD-15 (registration SP-BFX) was sold to Palestine, and used there by the Aviron Aviation Company (registration: VQ-PAE). From 1945, it was used as a passenger aircraft on routes from Lod to Tel Aviv and to Egypt. In December 1947, it had to be abandoned in Lod while undergoing repairs, and was burned on 6 April 1948 by Arabs.

After the outbreak of World War II, in September 1939 two civilian RWD-14 (SP-ALA, SP-KAT) were evacuated to Romania. After the fall of Poland, they were sold by the manufacturer for a fraction of value to Romanian government, and used by Romanian civil aviation (registration YR-FAN and YR-TIT respectively). After Romania joined the war on Axis side and took part in attack on the USSR, RWD-15s were used as liaison aircraft on the eastern front by the Romanian Air Force.

One RWD-15 was reportedly sent to the 1939 New York World's Fair, along with a RWD-13, and then sold there, but there is no evidence of such aircraft in the US register.

== Operators ==
British Mandate for Palestine

- Aviron

Israel

- Sherut Avir

Poland
Romania

- Royal Romanian Air Force

== Specifications ==
Data from Jane's all the World's Aircraft 1937, Polish Aircraft 1893–1939, Polskie konstrukcje lotnicze 1893-1939

General characteristics

- Crew: 1
- Capacity: 4
- Length: 9 m (29 ft 6 in)
- Wingspan: 12.4 m (40 ft 8 in)
- Height: 2.5 m (8 ft 2 in)
- Wing area: 20 m^{2} (220 sq ft)
- Empty weight: 875 kg (1,929 lb)
- Gross weight: 1,360 kg (2,998 lb)
- Fuel capacity: 240 L (63 US gal; 53 imp gal)
- Powerplant: 1 × de Havilland Gipsy Six II 6-cyl inverted air-cooled in-line piston engine, 153 kW (205 hp)
- Propellers: 2-bladed de Havilland 1000 (Hamilton) constant-speed metal propeller, 2.28 m (7 ft 6 in) diameter

Performance

- Maximum speed: 240 km/h (150 mph, 130 kn) at sea level
- Cruise speed: 210 km/h (130 mph, 110 kn) at 1,000 m (3,300 ft)

220 km/h (140 mph; 120 kn) at 3,000 m (9,800 ft)

- Landing speed: 75 km/h (47 mph; 40 kn)
- Range: 1,000 km (620 mi, 540 nmi) with two passengers

465 km (289 mi; 251 nmi) with four passengers

- Service ceiling: 5,000 m (16,000 ft) service ceiling
- Rate of climb: 4.8 m/s (940 ft/min)
- Time to altitude: 1,000 m (3,300 ft) in 5 minutes
- Wing loading: 68 kg/m^{2} (14 lb/sq ft)
- Power/mass: 0.1126 kW/kg (0.0685 hp/lb)
- Take-off distance to 8 m (26 ft): 200 m (660 ft)

== See also ==
Related development

- RWD-6 - RWD-9 – RWD-13 - RWD-20

Aircraft of comparable role, configuration, and era

- Stinson Reliant
- Heston Phoenix
