= RWD 1 =

Polish sports plane of 1928

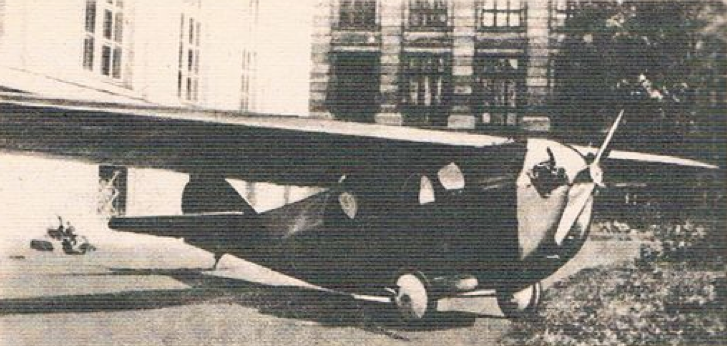

General information
- Type: Sports plane
- National origin: Poland
- Manufacturer: Warsaw University of Technology workshops
- Designer: RWD team
- Primary user: Poland
- Number built: 1

History
- Introduction date: 1928
- First flight: September 1928
- Retired: 1930

The RWD 1 was a Polish sports plane of 1928, a single-engine high-wing monoplane constructed by the RWD design team.

== Development ==
The RWD 1 was the first aircraft constructed by the RWD team of Stanisław Rogalski, Stanisław Wigura and Jerzy Drzewiecki in the Aviation Section of Mechanic Students' Club of Warsaw University of Technology. It was designed in late 1927. The plane was built with a financial help of the LOPP organization. One prototype was built for static trials, and one flying prototype (registration SP-ACC), completed and flown by the designer Jerzy Drzewiecki in September 1928.

Its unusual feature was a unique, fish-shaped fuselage, similar to early Messerschmitt's designs (M17). Two crewmen sat in tandem inside the fuselage and had only side openings in its upper part. In front of the pilot's head there was an upper part of the fuselage, supporting wings, limiting his view forward, though its profile was thin. This shape was repeated in following RWD designs. The aircraft was evaluated as a quite good design, with an original construction. It had high glide ratio of 12, and its payload was bigger than its empty weight. It was not built in any quantities, but gave a basis to further more successful RWD designs: RWD 2, RWD 3, RWD 4, RWD 7, and, partly RWD 5.

The prototype took part in the 2nd Polish Light Aircraft Contest in 1928, but did not complete it due to engine breakdown. In 1929 it took part in an air rally around Poland. It was scrapped in winter of 1929/1930.

== Description ==
Wooden construction single-engine high-wing cantilever monoplane, conventional in layout. The fuselage rectangular in cross-section, narrowing in upper part, plywood covered. Single-spar one-part trapezoid wings, covered with canvas and plywood in front. Cantilever empennage, covered with plywood (stabilizers) and canvas (rudder and elevators). The crew of two sat in tandem. The crew cockpits were open on the sides in upper part, and had individual doors (first cockpit on the right, second one on the left). A 2-cylinder air-cooled 40 hp ABC Scorpion II boxer engine (34 hp nominal power) was in front, driving two-blade wooden propeller Szomański (1.5 m diameter). Conventional fixed landing gear, sprung with a rubber rope, with a rear skid. Fuel tank in fuselage front (fuel consumption 9 L/h).

== Specifications (RWD 1) ==

Data from samoloty.ow : RWD 1, Polish aircraft 1893-1939

General characteristics

- Crew: 1
- Capacity: 1 passenger / second pilot 211 kg (465 lb)
- Length: 6 m (19 ft 8 in)
- Wingspan: 9.8 m (32 ft 2 in)
- Height: 1.7 m (5 ft 7 in)
- Wing area: 13.6 m^{2} (146 sq ft)
- Empty weight: 206 kg (454 lb)
- Gross weight: 417 kg (919 lb)
- Powerplant: 1 × ABC Scorpion II 2-cylinder air-cooled horizontally-opposed piston engine, 25 kW (34 hp) nominal

30 kW (40 hp) for take-off

- Propellers: 2-bladed Szomański fixed-pitch wooden propeller, 1.5 m (4 ft 11 in) diameter

Performance

- Maximum speed: 135 km/h (84 mph, 73 kn)
- Cruise speed: 115 km/h (71 mph, 62 kn)
- Stall speed: 65 km/h (40 mph, 35 kn)
- Range: 500 km (310 mi, 270 nmi)
- Service ceiling: 1,950 m (6,400 ft)
- Rate of climb: 1.8 m/s (350 ft/min)
- Wing loading: 30.66 kg/m^{2} (6.28 lb/sq ft)
- Power/mass: 0.0705 kW/kg (0.0429 hp/lb)
- Take-off run: 100 m (328 ft)
- Landing run: 130 m (427 ft)

== See also ==
Related development

- RWD 2, RWD 3, RWD 4, RWD 7

Aircraft of comparable role, configuration, and era

- Messerschmitt M17
