= RWD 4 =

Polish sports plane of 1930

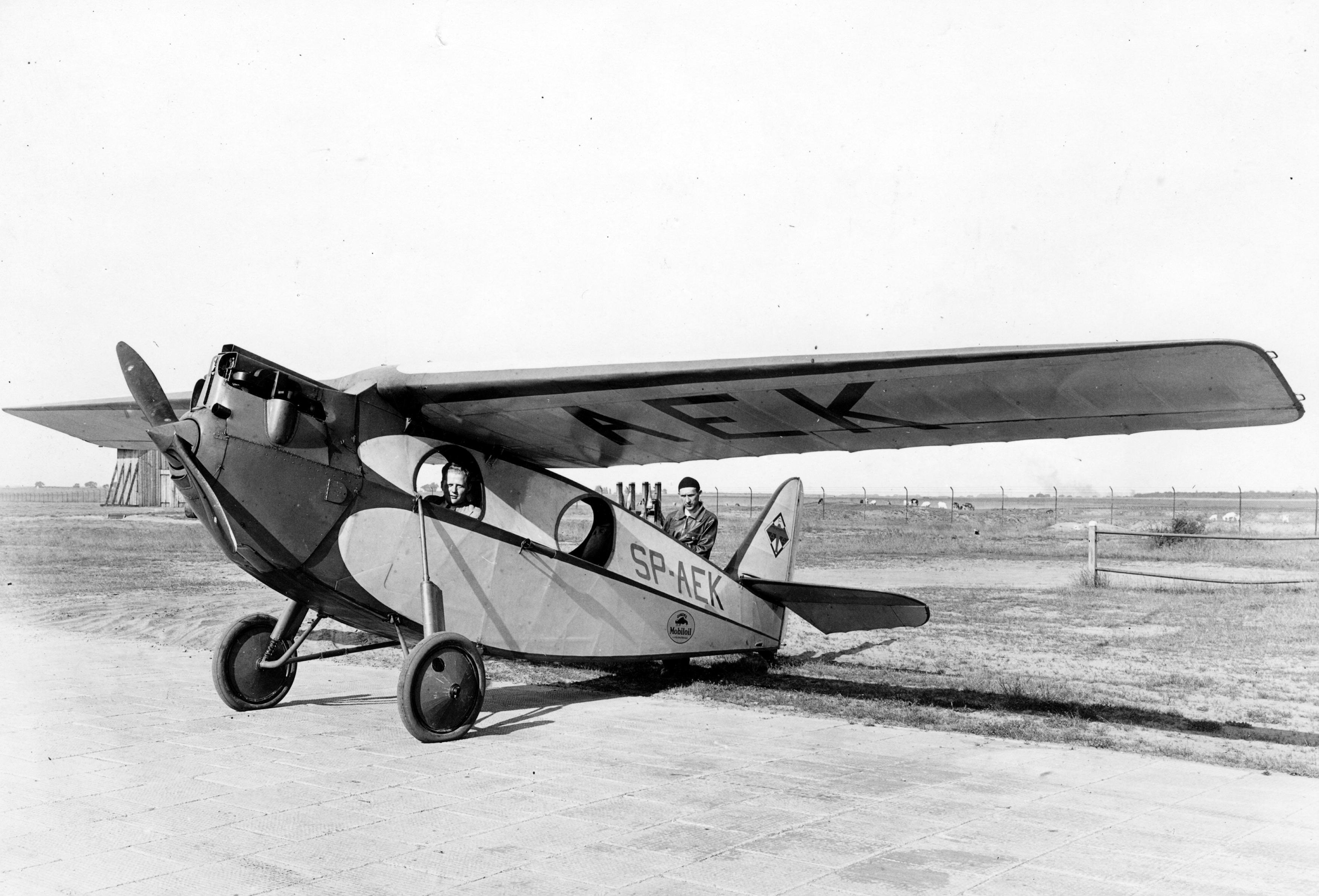

General information
- Type: Sports plane
- Manufacturer: Warsaw University of Technology workshops
- Designer: RWD team
- Primary user: Poland
- Number built: 9

History
- Manufactured: 1930
- Introduction date: 1930
- First flight: Spring 1930
- Retired: 1936

The RWD 4 was a Polish sports plane of 1930, constructed by the RWD team.

== Development ==
The RWD 4 was constructed by the RWD team of Stanisław Rogalski, Stanisław Wigura and Jerzy Drzewiecki in Warsaw. It was based upon their earlier RWD 2 design, but enlarged and fitted with more powerful inline engine. It retained the same fish-shaped fuselage without a direct view forward from the pilot's seat, though the view improved due to thin fuselage profile before the pilot. Also a silhouette became slimmer. The aircraft development was ordered by the Ministry of Communication especially for participation in the Challenge 1930 international air competition. At the same time, the RWD developed similar liaison aircraft project, the RWD 3, which shared many features with the RWD 4.

The first three aircraft (registration SP-ADK, -ADL and -ADM) were completed and flown by the designer Jerzy Drzewiecki in early 1930. In late 1930, a further six aircraft were built for the Polish Aero Club (registration SP-AEK, -AEL, AEY, -AEZ, -AFC, -AGP).

== Service ==
The first three aircraft took part in the Challenge 1930 competition in July. Only Jerzy Bajan completed the race on SP-ADM on the 32nd place (of 35 classified and 60 starting crews). Franciszek Żwirko (flying with Stanisław Wigura) withdrew due to engine failure, while the third pilot Tadeusz Karpiński withdrew due to illness.

RWD 4s were later used in Polish local air competitions, with some success (for example, F. Żwirko won the 3rd Polish Light Aircraft Contest in 1930, and other RWD 4s took the 2nd, 5th and 6th place). In 1931, in an international air meeting in Zagreb, Jerzy Bajan won 2nd place overall and the 1st place in aerobatics. RWD 4s were also used for training and glider towing in regional aero clubs. The first two were withdrawn in 1931, the last were scrapped in 1936, after quite short, but meritorious service in Polish sporting aviation.

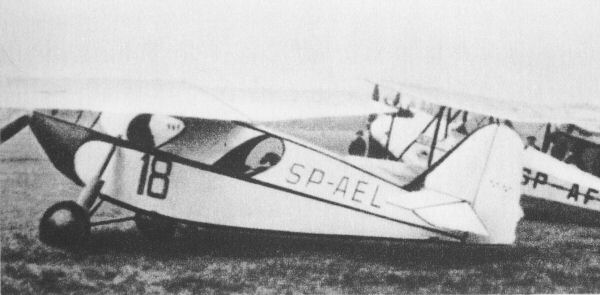
One of the first three RWD-4s

== Description ==
Wooden construction sports plane, conventional in layout, high-wing cantilever monoplane. The fuselage rectangular in cross-section (narrower in upper part), plywood-covered. Trapezoid one-part wing, canvas and plywood covered. A crew of two, sitting in tandem in the fuselage, with dual controls. The cockpits were open to the sides, with individual doors on the right. Principally powered by a 4-cylinder air-cooled 115 hp Cirrus Hermes straight engine (105 hp nominal power, 115 hp take-off power), driving a two-blade wooden propeller, the aircraft was also known to be fitted with 85 hp Cirrus III and 105 hp de Havilland Gipsy II engines. Landing gear was conventional, fixed, with a rear skid. The fuel tank capacity was 110 litres held in-wing giving fuel consumption of 21 litres per hour.

== Specifications (RWD 4) ==
Data from Polish aircraft, 1893-1939

General characteristics

- Crew: 1
- Capacity: 1 (passenger, student or second pilot) / 280–382 kg (617–842 lb)
- Length: 7 m (23 ft 0 in)
- Wingspan: 10.5 m (34 ft 5 in)
- Height: 2.26 m (7 ft 5 in)
- Wing area: 15 m^{2} (160 sq ft)
- Empty weight: 398 kg (877 lb)
- Gross weight: 780 kg (1,720 lb)
- Powerplant: 1 × Cirrus Hermes II 4-cylinder air-cooled in-line piston engine, 78–86 kW (105–115 hp)
- Propellers: 2-bladed fixed-pitch propeller

Performance

- Maximum speed: 205 km/h (127 mph, 111 kn) at sea level
- Cruise speed: 170 km/h (110 mph, 92 kn)
- Landing speed: 65 km/h (40 mph; 35 kn)
- Range: 800 km (500 mi, 430 nmi)
- Service ceiling: 5,000 m (16,000 ft)
- Rate of climb: 4.6 m/s (910 ft/min)
- Time to altitude: 1,000 m (3,300 ft) in 6 minutes
- Wing loading: 52 kg/m^{2} (11 lb/sq ft)
- Power/mass: 1.095 kW/kg (0.666 hp/lb)
- Take-off run: 110 m (360 ft)

== See also ==
Related development

- RWD 1
- RWD 2
- RWD 3
- RWD 5
- RWD 7
