= RWD 10 =

Polish aerobatics sports plane

RWD-10
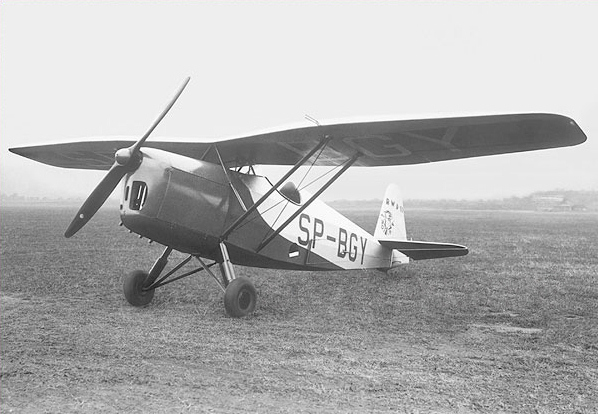

General information
- Type: Aerobatics plane
- Manufacturer: DWL
- Designer: RWD team
- Primary user: Poland
- Number built: ~22+1

History
- Manufactured: 1937-1938
- Introduction date: 1935
- First flight: July 1933
- Retired: 1939

The RWD-10 was a Polish aerobatics sports plane, single-seat parasol wing monoplane, used from 1933 to 1939 and constructed by the RWD team.

== Development ==
The aircraft was designed as a single-seater aerobatic sports plane that could also be used as a trainer for fighter pilots. Its chief designer was Jerzy Drzewiecki of the RWD design team at the DWL (Doświadczalne Warsztaty Lotnicze) aircraft factory. Its silhouette was similar to the RWD-8. The first prototype (registration SP-ALC), was flown in July 1933 by Drzewiecki. Its stability was not satisfactory, but after modifications, including lengthening of the fuselage, it turned out to be a successful design, completing state trials in 1935. In a mock dogfight with the PZL P.11c fighter, the RWD-10 kept on the P.11's tail. The first public aerobatics show of the RWD-10 took place during the Gordon Bennett Cup in ballooning on September 14–15, 1935 in Warsaw.

In 1936, the LOPP paramilitary organization ordered 20 aircraft, the purchase funded by a public collection for aviation development. They were built in 1937 and then distributed among the Polish regional aero clubs – the largest number going to the Warsaw Aero Club. In 1938, another two were built. In total, approximately 22 serial RWD-10s were produced.

Three aircraft crashed before the war, the rest were probably destroyed during the Invasion of Poland in 1939.

== Description ==
Mixed construction single-engine single-seat braced high-wing (parasol wing) monoplane, conventional in layout. Fuselage of a steel frame, covered with canvas on a wooden frame, in aluminum in engine section. Straight double-trapezoid two-part wing, of wooden construction, covered with canvas and plywood in front, two-spar. The wing was supported by a central pyramid and twin struts. Wooden construction cantilever empennage, covered with plywood (stabilizers) and canvas (rudder and elevators). A pilot in an open cockpit, had a windshield. Conventional fixed landing gear, with a rear skid. Four-cylinder air-cooled inverted straight engine PZInż. Junior (licence built Walter Junior) with 82 kW (110 hp) nominal power and 90 kW (120 hp) take-off power. Two-blade wooden propeller Szomański, of a fixed pitch. Fuel tank in the fuselage: 54 L (fuel consumption 25 L/h).

== Specifications (RWD-10) ==
Data from Polish aircraft 1893-1939

General characteristics

- Crew: 1
- Length: 6.2 m (20 ft 4 in)
- Wingspan: 7.5 m (24 ft 7 in)
- Height: 1.9 m (6 ft 3 in)
- Wing area: 9 m^{2} (97 sq ft)
- Empty weight: 350 kg (772 lb)
- Gross weight: 476 kg (1,049 lb)
- Fuel capacity: 54 L (14 US gal; 12 imp gal)
- Powerplant: 1 × PZ Inż. Junior 4-cylinder air-cooled inverted in-line piston engine, 90 kW (120 hp)
- Propellers: 2-bladed Szomański fixed pitch propeller

Performance

- Maximum speed: 230 km/h (140 mph, 120 kn) at sea level
- Cruise speed: 180 km/h (110 mph, 97 kn)
- Landing speed: 95 km/h (59 mph; 51 kn)
- Range: 400 km (250 mi, 220 nmi)
- Service ceiling: 6,000 m (20,000 ft)
- Rate of climb: 6.2 m/s (1,220 ft/min)
- Time to altitude: 1,000 m (3,300 ft) in 2 minutes 55 seconds
- Wing loading: 52.8 kg/m^{2} (10.8 lb/sq ft)
- Power/mass: 0.173 kW/kg (0.105 hp/lb)
- Take-off run: 67 m (220 ft)
- Landing run: 100 m (330 ft)

== See also ==
Aircraft of comparable role, configuration, and era

- Bücker Bü 131
- Focke-Wulf Fw 56
