= RWD-19 =

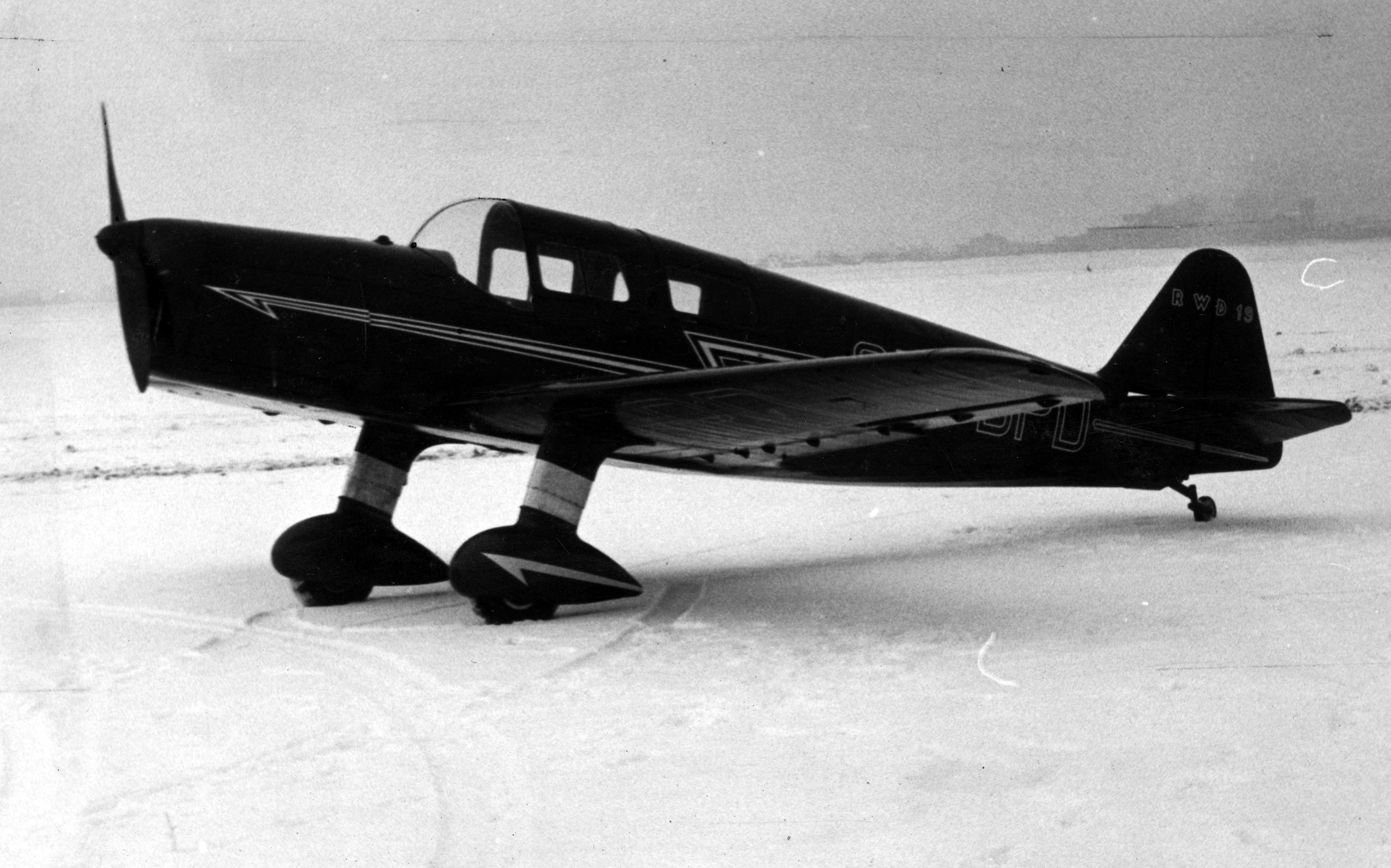
- RWD-19 (1938)

General information
- Type: Sports aircraft
- National origin: Poland
- Manufacturer: DWL
- Designer: Tadeusz Chyliński
- Status: prototype
- Number built: 1

History
- First flight: October 1938

The RWD-19 was a Polish two-seat low-wing sports aircraft of 1938, constructed by the RWD bureau.

== Development ==
The RWD-19 was designed in 1937-1938 in the RWD bureau. The chief designer was Jerzy Drzewiecki. Designer Tadeusz Chyliński designed the wing. The aircraft was designed specially in order to beat world records of distance in light aircraft category, under influence of French Caudron sports aircraft.

== Description ==
Mixed construction low-wing cantilever monoplane, conventional in layout, with a fixed landing gear and a closed cockpit. Steel framed fuselage, covered with canvas on a wooden frame, aluminum in front engine section. Three-part trapezoid wings with rounded tips, of wooden construction, two-spar, plywood (in front) and canvas covered, fitted with split flaps and slats. Conventional cantilever empennage, plywood (fins) and canvas (elevators and rudder) covered. Two seats in tandem, under a canopy, with a fixed panoramic windshield and small side windows. Behind the cockpit was a place for a baggage. Conventional fixed landing gear with a rear wheel, the main gear was in covers. 4-cylinder straight engine de Havilland Gipsy Major in front, driving a two-blade tractor wooden propeller Szomański of a fixed pitch. Fuel tanks 180 L in mid-wing section. Cruise fuel consumption 28 L/h.

== Operational history ==
The prototype was built and first flown in October 1938 (registration SP-BPD). In winter it was evaluated by the Aviation Technical Institute in Poland. It was rather difficult to fly. There were no plans of serial production. The plan of beating a record was abandoned, because the German Arado Ar 79 had made it in the meantime. The sole aircraft was probably destroyed during air raids on the DWL factory after the outbreak of World War II.

== Specifications (RWD 19) ==
Data from Polish aircraft 1893-1939, Polskie konstrukcje lotnicze 1893–1939

General characteristics

- Length: 7.4 m (24 ft 3 in)
- Wingspan: 9.7 m (31 ft 10 in)
- Wing area: 12 m^{2} (130 sq ft)
- Empty weight: 580 kg (1,279 lb)
- Gross weight: 900 kg (1,984 lb)
- Fuel capacity: 180 L (48 US gal; 40 imp gal)
- Fuel consumption: 28 L/h (7.4 gal/h; 6.2 imp gal/h)
- Powerplant: 1 × de Havilland Gipsy Major I 4-cylinder inverted air-cooled in-line piston engine, 97 kW (130 hp)

or P.Z.Inż Major

- Propellers: 2-bladed Szomański fixed-pitch propeller

Performance

- Maximum speed: 258 km/h (160 mph, 139 kn) at sea level
- Cruise speed: 217 km/h (135 mph, 117 kn)
- Landing speed: 72 km/h (45 mph; 39 kn)
- Range: 1,300 km (810 mi, 700 nmi)
- Service ceiling: 5,000 m (16,000 ft)
- Rate of climb: 4.6 m/s (910 ft/min)

== See also ==
Aircraft of comparable role, configuration, and era

- Arado Ar 79
