= RWD 2 =

1929 Polish sports plane

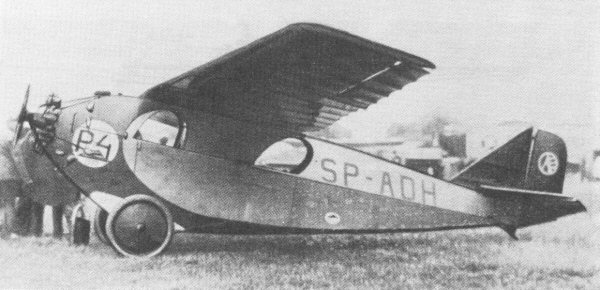
- RWD-2 during the Challenge 1930

General information
- Type: Sports plane
- National origin: Poland
- Manufacturer: Warsaw University of Technology workshops
- Designer: RWD team
- Primary user: Polish civilian aviation
- Number built: 4

History
- Manufactured: 1929-1930
- Introduction date: 1929
- First flight: July 1929
- Retired: 1935

The RWD 2 was a 1929 Polish single-engine high-wing monoplane sports plane constructed by the RWD team.

== Development ==
The RWD 2 was constructed by the RWD team of Stanisław Rogalski, Stanisław Wigura and Jerzy Drzewiecki in the Aviation Section of Mechanic Students' Club of Warsaw University of Technology. It was a development of their first design RWD-1. Its feature was a unique, fish-shaped fuselage, with good aerodynamics, but without a direct view forward from the pilot's seat. For this reason, they were later nicknamed: blind mice.

The first prototype (registration SP-ACE) was completed and flown by the designer Jerzy Drzewiecki in July 1929. Since it appeared successful in sports flying, three more RWD-2s were built in 1930 (registration SP-ADJ, -ADG, -ADH).

== Use ==
In August–September 1929, Franciszek Żwirko and Stanisław Wigura flew the prototype across Europe, on the 5000 km Warsaw-Paris-Barcelona-Warsaw route (it was the first long foreign journey of the Polish-designed aircraft). On 16 October 1929, Żwirko and Antoni Kocjan set an international FAI altitude record of 4,004 m (13,133 ft) in the light tourist plane class (below 280 kg / 616 lb empty weight).

Three serial aircraft took part in the Challenge 1930 international touring planes competition in July 1930. Stanisław Płonczyński took the 19th place, as the best Pole (for 35 qualified and 60 starting crews), and Edward Więckowski took the 21st place (the third Józef Muślewski was disqualified due to time exceeding, but he completed the rally off the contest). In the Challenge, RWD-2s won the trial of lowest fuel consumption (5.2 kg / 100 km). According to Flight, they "appear to possess particularly good air-sailing qualities".

RWD 2s were also used in several Polish air competitions and other minor international ones, with some success. They were also used for training in the Polish Aero Club in Warsaw, Poznań and Vilnius. They were withdrawn in 1935 (one was bought by a private owner and flew for some time longer).

== Description ==
Wooden construction high-wing cantilever monoplane, conventional in layout. Fuselage rectangular in cross-section, plywood covered. Single-spar one-part wing of a trapezoid shape, covered with canvas and plywood in front. Cantilever empennage, covered with plywood (stabilizers) and canvas (rudder and elevators). Crew of two, sitting in tandem, with dual controls. The crew cabs were open on the sides in upper part, they had individual doors on the right side. Salmson 9Ad, 46 hp (40 hp nominal power), 9-cylinder air-cooled radial engine in front, driving a two-bladed metal propeller (wooden in the prototype). Conventional fixed landing gear, sprung by rubber rope, with a rear skid. Fuel tank 75 L in fuselage front (fuel consumption - 9.5 L/ flight hour).

== Specifications (RWD 2) ==
Data from Polish aircraft, 1893-1939

General characteristics

- Crew: 1
- Capacity: 1
- Length: 6.15 m (20 ft 2 in)
- Wingspan: 9.8 m (32 ft 2 in)
- Height: 1.9 m (6 ft 3 in)
- Wing area: 13.6 m^{2} (146 sq ft)
- Empty weight: 260 kg (573 lb)
- Gross weight: 500 kg (1,102 lb)
- Max takeoff weight: 500 kg (1,102 lb)
- Fuel capacity: 75 L (20 US gal; 16 imp gal)
- Powerplant: × Salmson 9Ad 9-cylinder air-cooled radial piston engine, 30 kW (40 hp) (nominal)
- Propellers: 2-bladed fixed-pitch propeller

Performance

- Maximum speed: 155 km/h (96 mph, 84 kn) at sea level
- Cruise speed: 130 km/h (81 mph, 70 kn)
- Landing speed: 65 km/h (40 mph; 35 kn)
- Range: 550 km (340 mi, 300 nmi)
- Service ceiling: 4,000 m (13,000 ft)
- Rate of climb: 3 m/s (590 ft/min)
- Wing loading: 36.8 kg/m^{2} (7.5 lb/sq ft)
- Power/mass: 0.059 kW/kg (0.036 hp/lb)
- Take-off run: 120 m (394 ft)
- Take-off run to 8.5 m (28 ft): 260.5 m (855 ft)
- Landing run from 8.5 m (28 ft): 219 m (719 ft)

== See also ==
Related development

- RWD-1
- RWD-3
- RWD-4
- RWD-7

Aircraft of comparable role, configuration, and era

- Peyret-Mauboussin PM XI
- Messerschmitt M17
