= Drzewiecki JD-2 =

JD-2
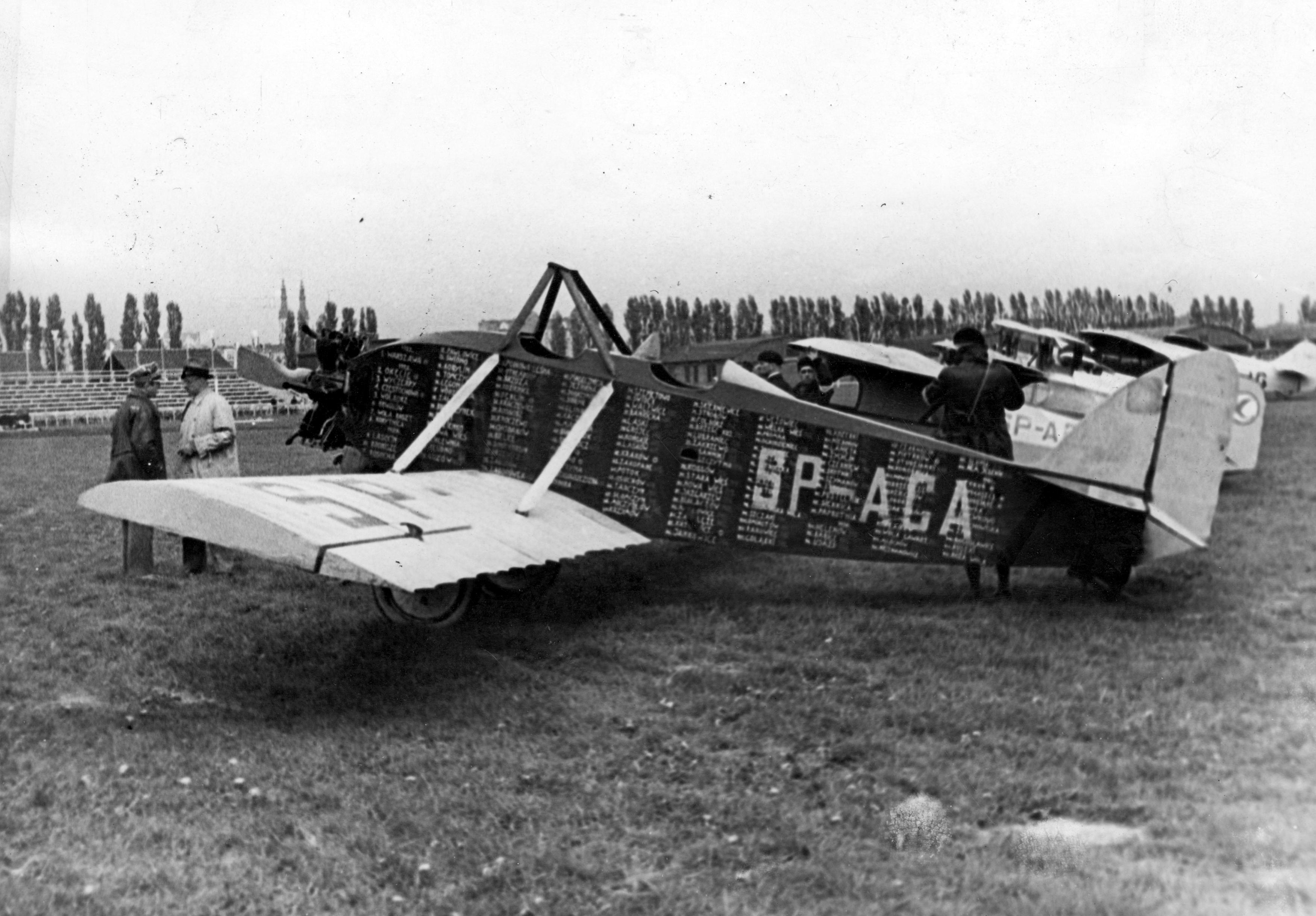

General information
- Type: Sports plane
- Manufacturer: Warsaw University of Technology workshops
- Designer: Jerzy Drzewiecki
- Primary user: Poland
- Number built: 5

History
- Introduction date: 1927
- First flight: October 5, 1926
- Retired: 1936

The JD-2 was a Polish sports plane of 1926. It was the first sports plane designed in Poland, that was built in a small series.

== Design and development ==
The JD-2 was the first aircraft constructed by the Aviation Section of the Mechanic Students' Club of the Warsaw University of Technology (later a home of the RWD design team). The main designer was Jerzy Drzewiecki, hence a designation JD. The aircraft was designed in late 1925, around an available Anzani engine. It was the only plane of Drzewiecki's individual design and to carry JD designation, as he later worked as a member of the RWD team.

The prototype, with a workshop number SL-4, was built in 1926 and first flown on October 5, 1926 in Warsaw. During landing, a fuel pipe broke and the aircraft burned, injuring the military pilot Kazimierz Kalina. The pilot, however, expressed a good opinion on its handling, so the second modified aircraft (SL-6) was built, and one more airframe for static trials (SL-5).

The second prototype SL-6 was flown on June 26, 1927. Its handling was however not too good, it was also 90 kg heavier, than estimated. It was given a registration P-PSLA, from 1929: SP-ACA.

In 1929 two more aircraft of an improved variant, the JD-2bis were built for aero clubs, with a financial help of LOPP paramilitary organization. It had changed fuselage front, wing tips and a tail fin (SL-14 and 15, registration numbers: SP-ACD and ACF). In 1930 there was built one more JD-2bis (SL-20, SP-ADP). It was later fitted with a stronger radial engine 80 hp Armstrong Siddeley Genet.

== Operational history ==
The second JD-2 (SP-ACA) was used by the Warsaw Aero Club. Flown by Kazimierz Kalina, it won in the 1st Polish Light Aircraft Contest in October 1929, and flown by Worledge it took the 7th place in the 2nd Contest the following year. In 1929 it was bought by a private owner Pawłowski, who crashed it that year. Next it was repaired and bought by Captain Zbigniew Babiński, who used it for touring flying - by 1931 the plane visited 225 airfields, evident from inscriptions on its fuselage. The plane was written off in August 1935.

The JD-2bis SP-ACD was built for Lwów Academic Aero Club and it crashed on 18 August 1930 in Lwów, injuring a pilot M. Pakuła. The other one, SP-ACF, built for Warsaw Academic Aero Club, crashed on 16 March 1930, killing pilot K. Trzetrzewiński.

The last JD-2bis, SP-ADP, nicknamed "Adepcia" (a female name created from its registration letters), was built for the aviator Witold Rychter. In September–October 1930 Ignacy Giedgowd flying it, took the 3rd place in the 3rd Polish Light Aircraft Contest. It was written off in August 1936.

The Ministry of Communication planned to build 10 aircraft for regional aero clubs, also Poznań and Cracov Aero Clubs planned to order JD-2bis, but these planes were not realized. JD-2bis was a difficult to fly machine, with low stability, it was however liked by some pilots.

== Description ==
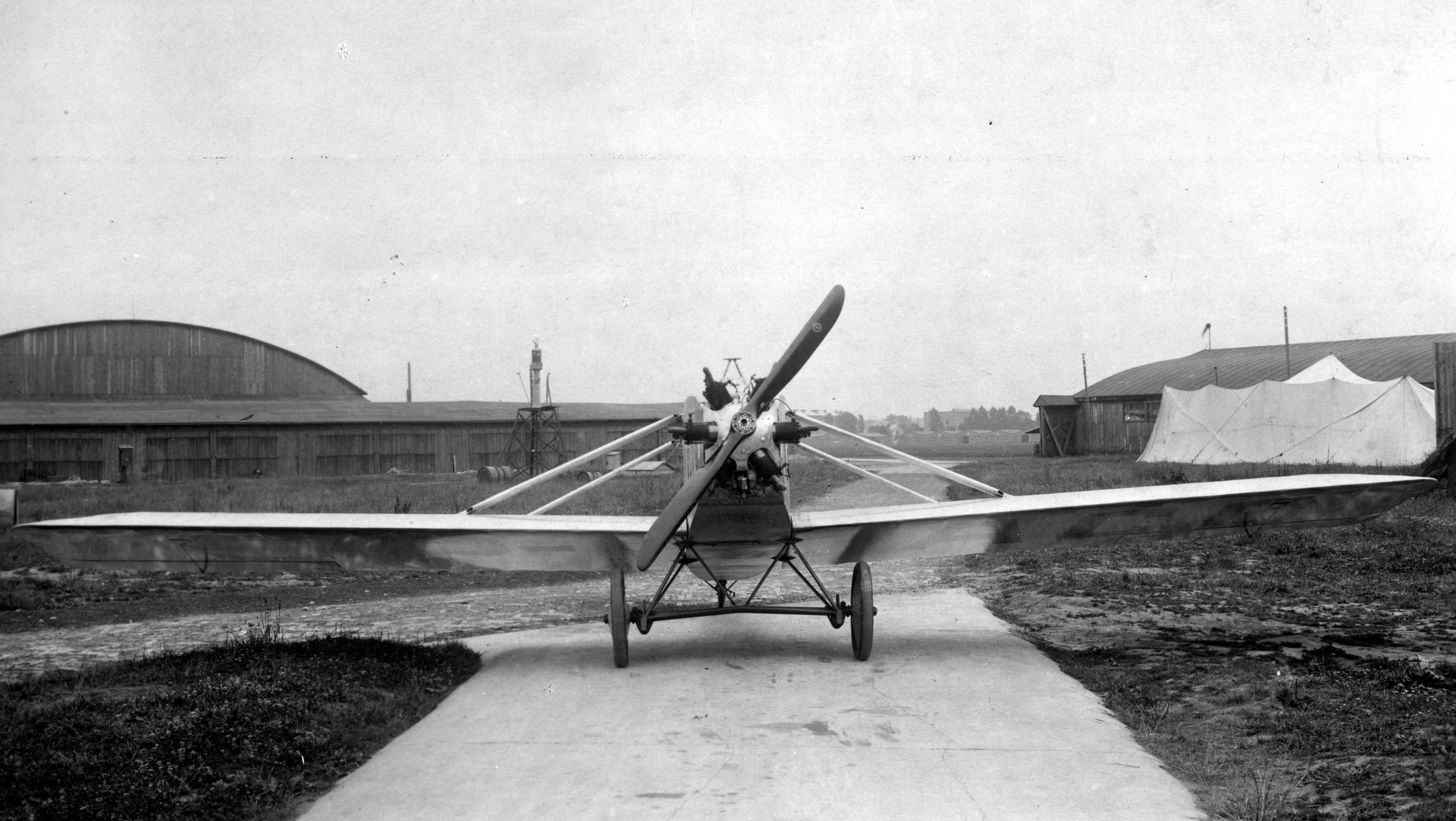

The JD-2 was a wooden construction low-wing braced monoplane, conventional in layout, with open cockpits. A fuselage was rectangular in cross-section, plywood-covered. In the JD-2bis, the fuselage was aluminium covered in an engine section. Wings were two-piece, rectangular with straight tips, two-spar, covered with canvas and plywood (in front section), supported with twin struts. Conventional empennage, covered with plywood (fins) and canvas (elevators and rudder). Two open cockpits in tandem, with individual windshields and twin controls. A safety cage of steel pipes was above the front cockpit (JD-2) or before the front cockpit (JD-2bis). It had a fixed conventional landing gear, sprung with a rubber rope, with a common axle and a rear skid.

45 hp (34 kW) 6-cylinder Anzani radial engine in front, air-cooled. Two-blade fixed wooden propeller Szomański. A fuel tank was in a fuselage front. Cruise fuel consumption 17 L/h.

== Specifications (JD-2) ==
Data from Polskie konstrukcje lotnicze 1893-1939

General characteristics

- Crew: 1
- Capacity: 1 / 211 kg (465 lb)
- Length: 5.95 m (19 ft 6 in)
- Wingspan: 9.7 m (31 ft 10 in)
- Height: 2.8 m (9 ft 2 in)
- Wing area: 13.5 m^{2} (145 sq ft)
- Empty weight: 335 kg (739 lb)
- Gross weight: 546 kg (1,204 lb)
- Powerplant: 1 × Anzani 6-cylinder radial piston engine, 34 kW (45 hp)
- Propellers: 2-bladed fixed-pitch propeller

Performance

- Maximum speed: 130 km/h (81 mph, 70 kn)
- Cruise speed: 116 km/h (72 mph, 63 kn)
- Stall speed: 68 km/h (42 mph, 37 kn)
- Range: 450 km (280 mi, 240 nmi)
- Service ceiling: 2,200 m (7,200 ft)
- Wing loading: 40.5 kg/m^{2} (8.3 lb/sq ft)
- Take-off run: 80 m (262 ft)
- Landing run: 130 m (427 ft)

== See also ==
Aircraft of comparable role, configuration, and era

- PWS-51
