= RWD 6 =

Polish sports plane of 1932

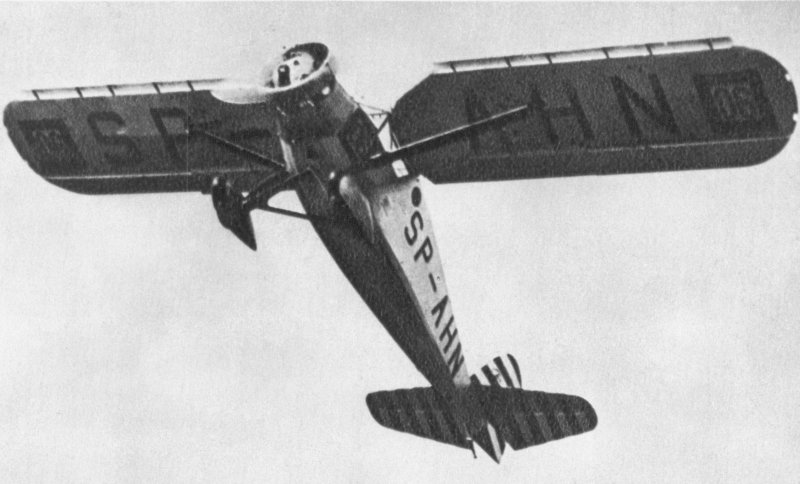
- RWD 6 of Franciszek Zwirko during a short take-off trial at the Challenge 1932

General information
- Type: Sports plane
- Manufacturer: Warsaw University of Technology workshops
- Designer: RWD team
- Primary user: Polish civilian aviation
- Number built: 3

History
- Introduction date: 1932
- First flight: 3 June 1932
- Retired: 1935

The RWD 6 was a Polish sports plane of 1932, constructed by the RWD team. It was a winner of the Challenge 1932 international tourist aircraft contest.

== Development ==
The aircraft was designed specially for the purpose of competing in the international tourist aircraft contest Challenge, which RWD attended in 1930, without major success. It was constructed by the RWD team of Stanislaw Rogalski, Stanislaw Wigura and Jerzy Drzewiecki in the workshops of Students' Mechanical Club of Warsaw University of Technology (their designs were named RWD after their initial letters). The new plane differed from previous RWD designs, having a cab with two seats next to each other, folding wings and good wing mechanization (slats and flaps).

Only three aircraft were built, the first one was flown on June 3, 1932, by its designer Jerzy Drzewiecki. The aircraft were given civilian registrations SP-AHL, SP-AHM and SP-AHN. During trials, SP-AHM crashed and Drzewiecki was hurt. After some modification of the tail, the two remaining RWD 6s were sent to the Challenge contest.

Challenge 1932, held between August 11–28, 1932, was eventually won by Franciszek Żwirko (pilot) and Stanisław Wigura (mechanic) in their RWD 6 SP-AHN, with a start number O6. The other RWD 6, flown by Tadeusz Karpiński, took ninth place out of 43 competitors (SP-AHL, nr. O4). During contest, the RWD 6 was given the highest scores for technical evaluation of all participating aircraft.

On September 11, 1932, the RWD 6 SP-AHN with Franciszek Żwirko and Stanisław Wigura aboard, crashed during a storm while flying to an air meeting in Czechoslovakia. Both died. The cause was found to be weak wing mountings, that caused wing warping at higher speeds. The last remaining RWD 6 (SP-AHL) was modified after this accident, receiving a strengthened wing with V-shaped struts and the new designation RWD 6bis. The RWD 6bis was completed and flown in September 1933. In 1935 it was broken up, and its fuselage was used to create the RWD 13 touring plane prototype. A direct development of the RWD 6 as a sport plane was a four-seater RWD 9, a winner of the Challenge 1934.

== Description ==
The RWD 6 was a two-seater sports and touring strutted high-wing monoplane of a mixed construction. A metal frame fuselage covered with canvas, with the engine clad in aluminium sheets. It had rectangular single-spar wing of wooden construction, canvas and plywood covered. Its wings folded rearwards, and were equipped with automatic slats and flaps. Closed cabin with two seats side-by-side, with dual controls. The cabin had a pair of doors. 7-cylinder Armstrong Siddeley Genet Major radial engine of 104 kW (140 hp) (119 kW, 160 hp start power). Two-blade metal propeller. Conventional landing gear, with a rear skid. Fuel tanks in wings (140 L, 34 US gal). Take-off: 111 m (to altitude 8 m), landing: 106 m (from altitude 8 m – best results from the Challenge contest).

== Specifications ==
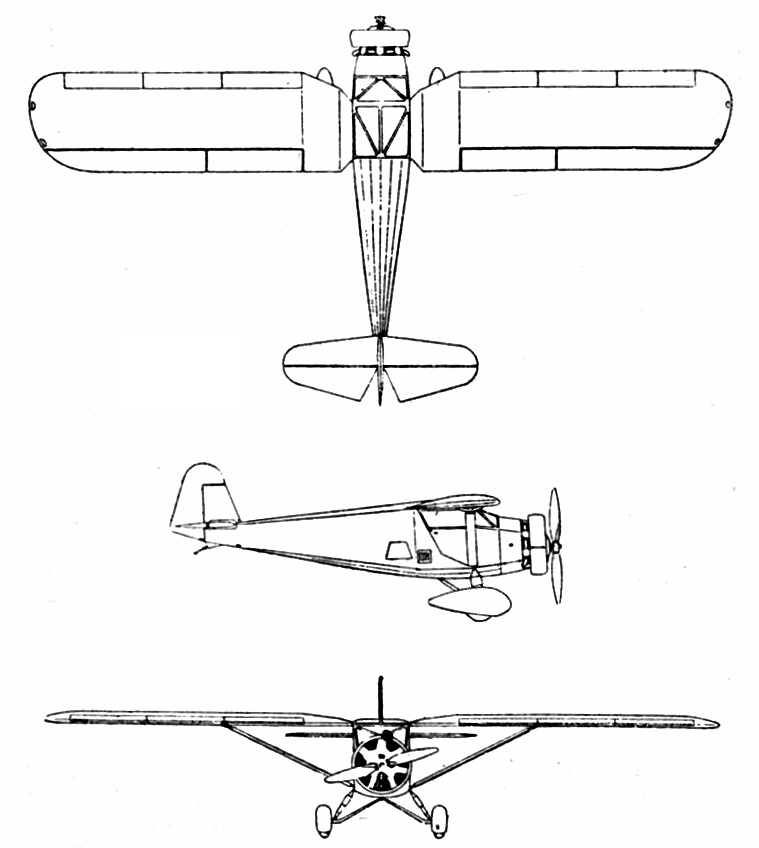
RWD 6 3 view from l'Aerophile magazine, January 1933

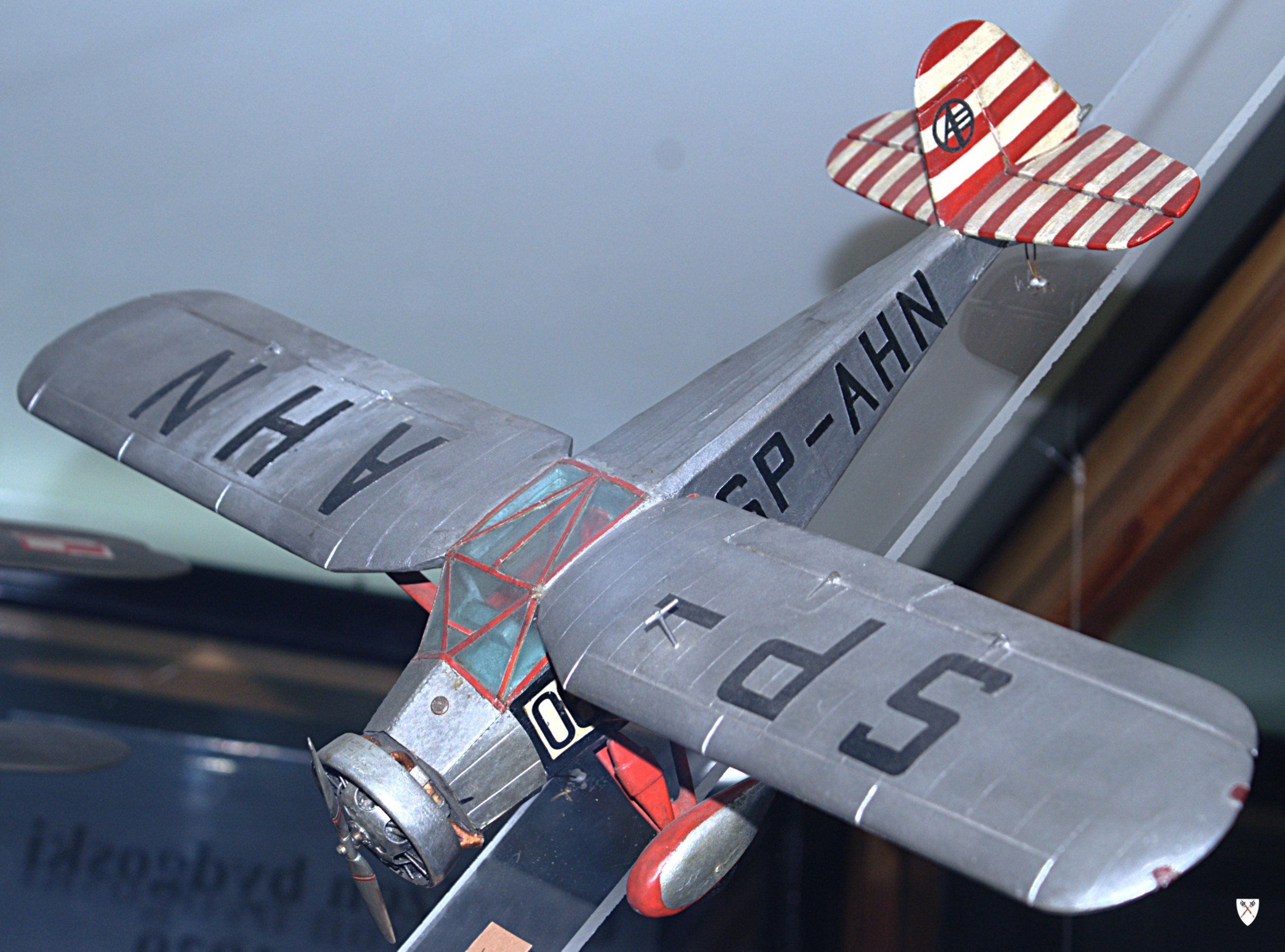

Data from Polish aircraft 1893-1939

General characteristics

- Crew: 2
- Capacity: 2
- Length: 6.6 m (21 ft 8 in)
- Wingspan: 11 m (36 ft 1 in)
- Height: 2.07 m (6 ft 9 in)
- Wing area: 16 m^{2} (170 sq ft)
- Empty weight: 475 kg (1,047 lb)
- Gross weight: 750 kg (1,653 lb)
- Fuel capacity: 140 L (37 US gal; 31 imp gal) in two wing tanks
- Powerplant: 1 × Armstrong Siddeley Genet Major 7-cylinder air-cooled radial piston engine, 120 kW (160 hp)
- Propellers: 2-bladed adjustable-pitch metal propeller

Performance

- Maximum speed: 225 km/h (140 mph, 121 kn) at sea level
- Cruise speed: 190 km/h (120 mph, 100 kn)
- Stall speed: 57.6 km/h (35.8 mph, 31.1 kn)
- Landing speed: 60 km/h (37 mph; 32 kn)
- Range: 650 km (400 mi, 350 nmi)
- Service ceiling: 6,000 m (20,000 ft)
- Rate of climb: 5.5 m/s (1,080 ft/min)
- Time to altitude: 1,000 m (3,300 ft) in 3 minutes 20 seconds
- Wing loading: 46.9 kg/m^{2} (9.6 lb/sq ft)
- Power/mass: 0.1522 kW/kg (.0926 hp/lb)

== See also ==
Related development

- RWD 9
- RWD 13
