= Doświadczalne Warsztaty Lotnicze =

Polish aircraft manufacturer

- Industry: Aerospace
- Founded: 1933
- Headquarters: Okęcie, Poland

Doświadczalne Warsztaty Lotnicze (DWL) ('Experimental Aeronautical Workshops') was a Polish aircraft manufacturer, active from 1933 to 1939. It was the home of the RWD construction team and manufactured aircraft under the brand RWD.

== History ==
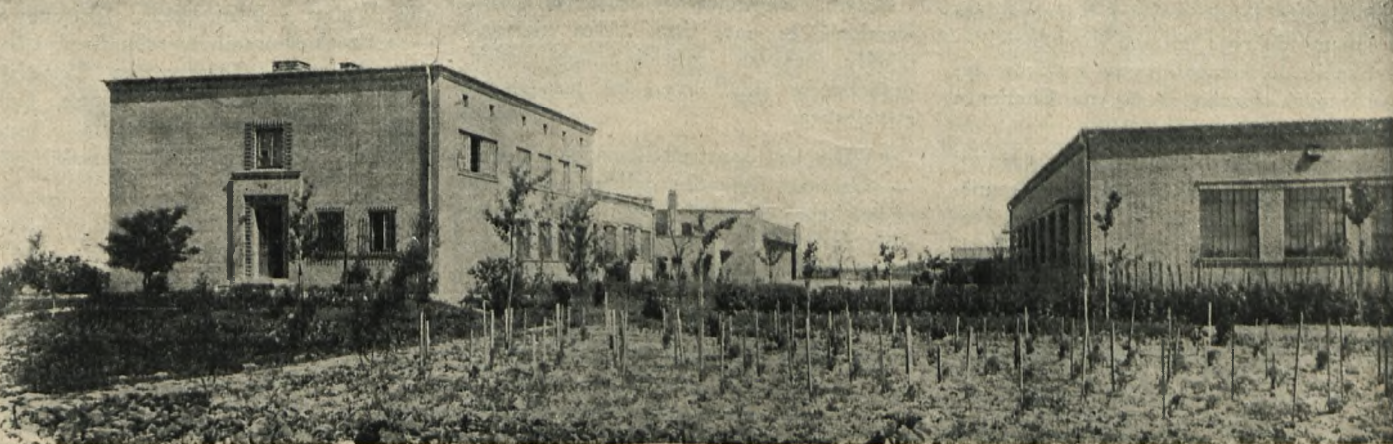
The factory in Okęcie

The RWD construction team was organized of students of Warsaw University of Technology around 1928. They built their first designs in workshops of the Aviation Section of Students' Mechanical Club, in University buildings. In 1930 the workshops moved to new buildings near Okęcie airport in Warsaw, founded by the LOPP organization. In March 1933 the workshops separated from the Aviation Section and the University, and there was created a company Doświadczalne Warsztaty Lotnicze to manufacture RWD aircraft.

Main designers were Stanisław Rogalski and Jerzy Drzewiecki of the RWD team, other designers were Bronisław Żurakowski, Tadeusz Chylinski, Leszek Dulęba and Andrzej Anczutin and several engineers, including Henry Millicer. A company director was Jerzy Wędrychowski.

First RWD designs manufactured in the DWL were the Polish basic trainer RWD-8 and the sports plane RWD-9 (the winner of Challenge 1934 international contest). Due to limited capabilities of DWL, only some 80 RWD-8s were made in the DWL, and about 470 licence-built in Podlaska Wytwórnia Samolotów (PWS). Also, a reconnaissance plane RWD-14 Czapla was licence-built in Lubelska Wytwórnia Samolotów (LWS) only.

The plane manufactured in biggest number in DWL was a touring plane RWD-13 (about 100). Other important designs were the RWD-10 aerobatic plane (1933), RWD-17 aerobatic-trainer plane (1937) and RWD-21 light sports plane (1939). World War II prevented further development and serial production of later RWD designs, and put an end to the DWL workshops.

== Aircraft ==
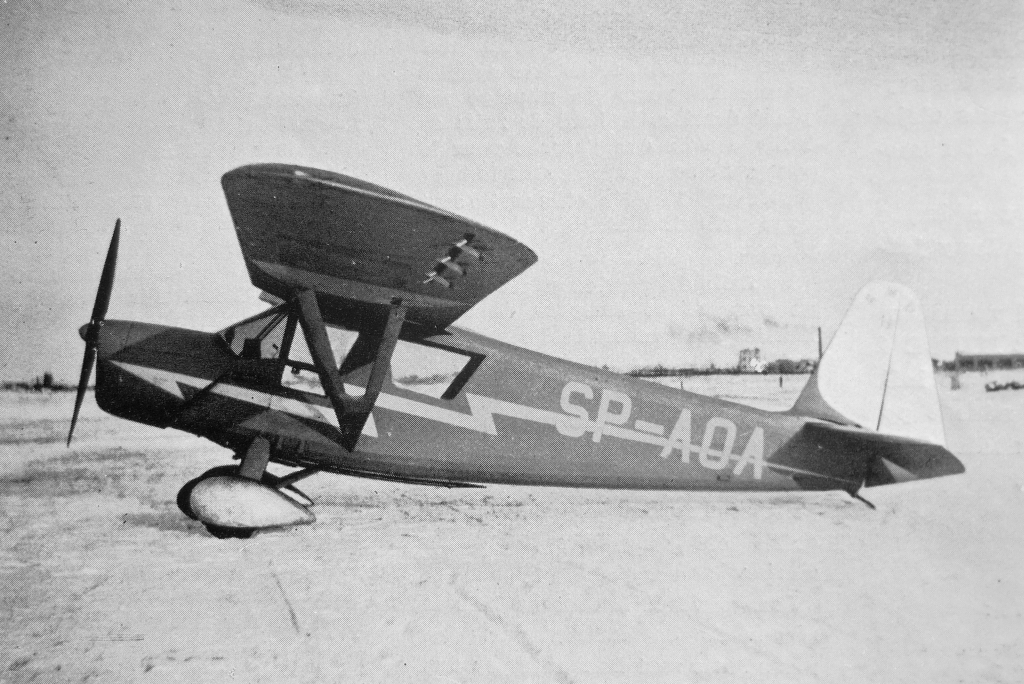
RWD-13

DWL operated as the factory of RWD. As such, once testing was completed and design was finalized by the latter, it would be passed to the former for mass production.

Model name	First flight	Number built	Type
RWD-5	1931	20	Single engine monoplane sport airplane
RWD-8	1933	~80 (Note: Although an RWD/DWL design, only about 80 aircraft were built by DWL.)	Single engine monoplane trainer
RWD-9	1933	10	Single engine monoplane sport airplane
RWD 10	1933	~23	Single engine monoplane aerobatic airplane
RWD 13	1935	~100	Single engine monoplane touring airplane
RWD 17	1937	~30	Single engine monoplane trainer
RWD 21	1939	6+	Single engine monoplane sport airplane
