= RW1 =

RW1 may refer to:

- Rogalski and Wigura R.W.1, a Polish light plane from 1927.
- RagWing RW1 Ultra-Piet, an ultralight aircraft design
- (8258) 1982 RW1, a minor planet
