= RWD (aircraft manufacturer) =

Polish aircraft manufacturer 1928–1939

- Industry: Aerospace
- Founded: 1928
- Founders: Jerzy Drzewiecki; Stanisław Rogalski; Stanisław Wigura
- Headquarters: Okęcie, Warsaw, Poland

RWD was a Polish aircraft construction bureau active between 1928 and 1939. It started as a team of three young designers, Stanisław Rogalski, Stanisław Wigura and Jerzy Drzewiecki, whose names formed the RWD acronym.

== History ==
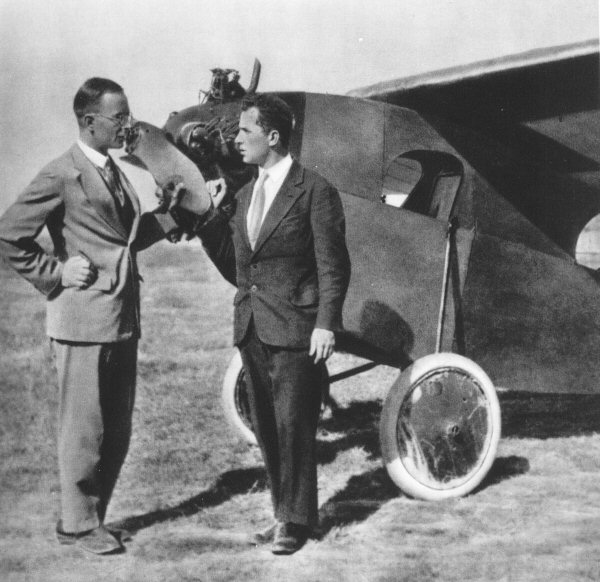
Jerzy Drzewiecki and Jerzy Wedrychowski by the RWD-7

The three eventual founders of RWD started work while studying at Warsaw University of Technology. In December 1925, with some other student constructors, they set up workshops at the Aviation Section of Mechanics Students' Club (Sekcja Lotnicza Koła Mechaników Studentów), where they manufactured their first designs. From 1926 they designed several aircraft alone (Drzewiecki JD-2 and WR-1), in 1928 they joined forces as one team, starting with RWD-1 sportsplane. Apart from building planes, J. Drzewiecki was a test pilot of their designs, while S. Wigura flew as a mechanic in competitions. In 1930 the team was moved to new workshops at Okęcie district in Warsaw, near the Okęcie aerodrome, today's Warsaw International Airport, founded by the LOPP paramilitary organization. On 11 September 1932, Stanisław Wigura died in an air crash in the RWD-6 during a storm, but the RWD name continued to be used for new designs (according to a popular story, the letter W now de facto stood for engineer Jerzy Wędrychowski, but he was not a designer). In 1933, Rogalski, Drzewiecki and Wędrychowski founded the company Doświadczalne Warsztaty Lotnicze (DWL, Experimental Aeronautical Works) in Warsaw, which became a manufacturer of further RWD aircraft. Apart from Rogalski and Drzewiecki, the construction bureau employed designers Tadeusz Chyliński, Bronisław Żurakowski, Leszek Dulęba and Andrzej Anczutin and several engineers, including Henryk Millicer.

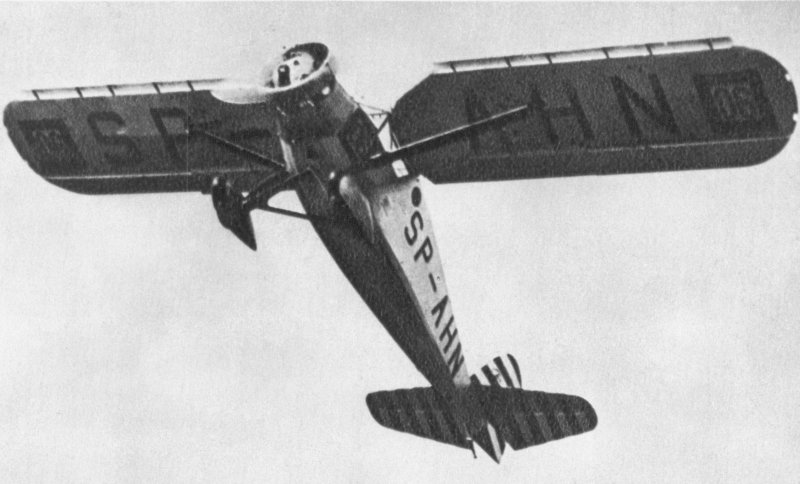
RWD-6 in the Challenge 1932.

At first, the RWD team designed and built light sport planes. Early designs RWD-2 and RWD-4 were built in small series and used in Polish sports aviation, including their debut at the Challenge 1930 international contest. Their next designs performed particularly well in competitions - the RWD-6 won the Challenge 1932 and RWD-9s won the Challenge 1934 international contest. The RWD-5 sport plane was the lightest plane to fly across the Atlantic in 1933. Three types saw mass production: the RWD-8, which became the Polish Air Force's basic trainer, the RWD-13 touring plane and the RWD-14 Czapla reconnaissance plane (1938).

Other important designs were the RWD-10 aerobatic plane (1933), RWD-17 aerobatic-trainer plane (1937) and RWD-21 light sport plane (1939). World War II prevented further development and serial production of later RWD designs, and put an end to the RWD construction bureau and the DWL production plant.

== Aircraft ==
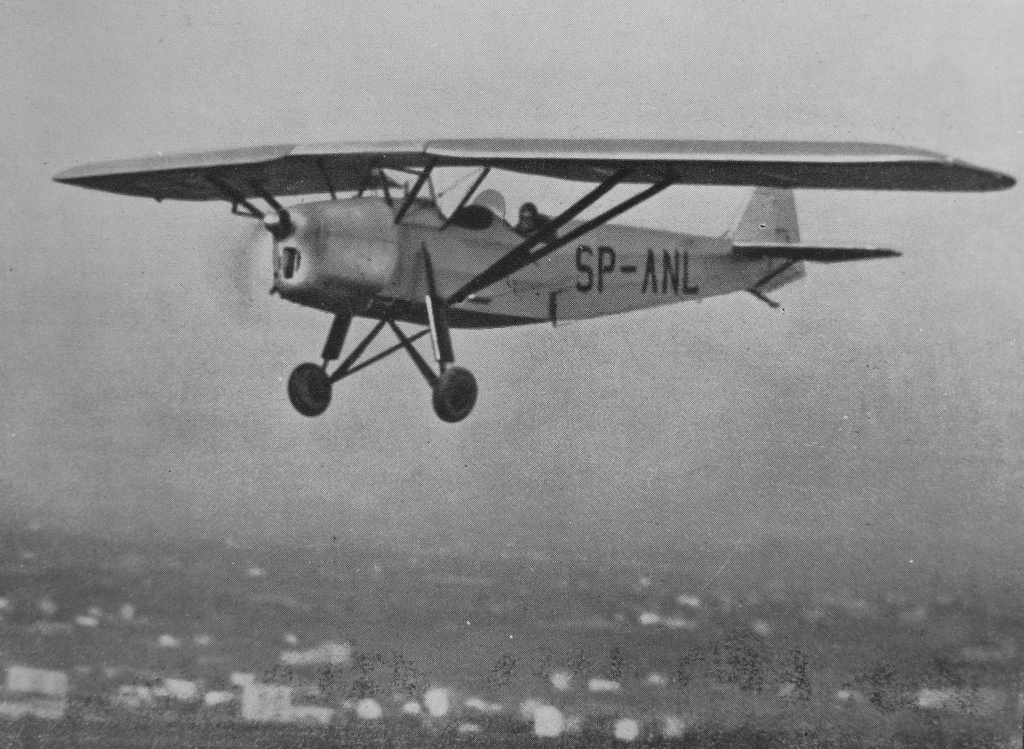
RWD-8

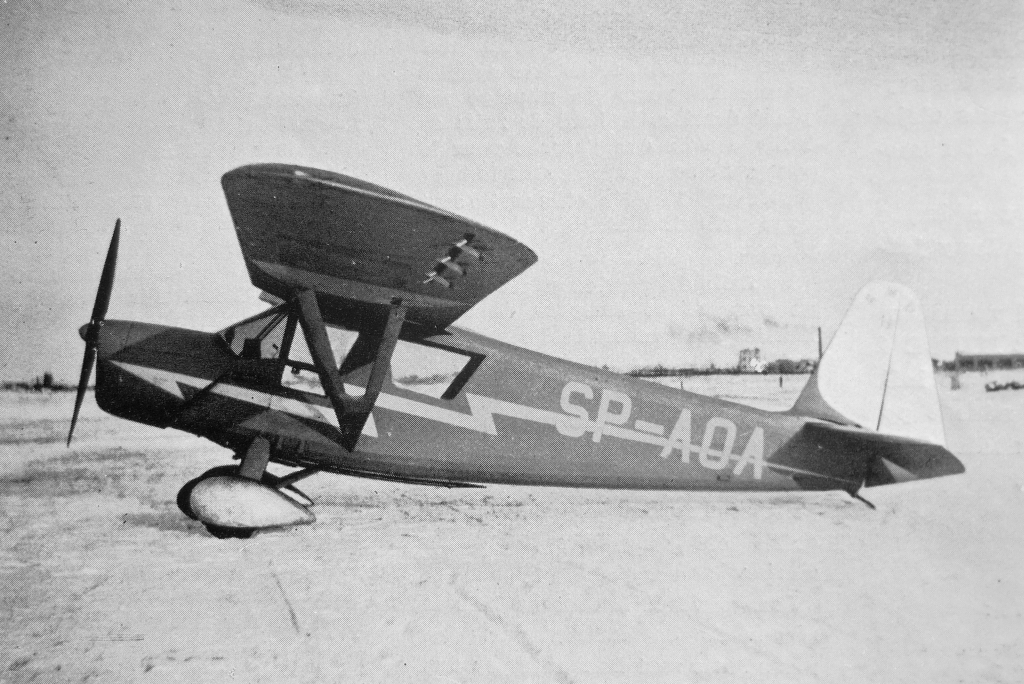
RWD-13

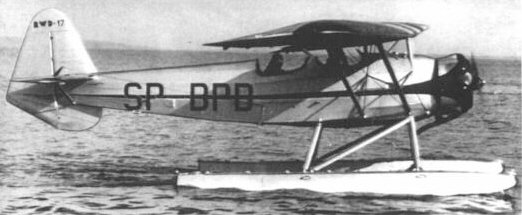
RWD-17W

| Model name | First flight | Number built | Type |
|---|---|---|---|
| RWD 1 | 1928 | 1 | Single engine monoplane sport airplane |
| RWD 2 | 1929 | 4 | Single engine monoplane sport airplane |
| RWD 3 | 1930 | 1 | Single engine monoplane sport airplane |
| RWD 4 | 1930 | 9 | Single engine monoplane sport airplane |
| RWD 5 | 1931 | 20 | Single engine monoplane sport airplane |
| RWD 6 | 1932 | 3 | Single engine monoplane sport airplane |
| RWD 7 | 1931 | 1 | Single engine monoplane sport airplane |
| RWD 8 | 1933 | 550+ | Single engine monoplane trainer |
| RWD 9 | 1933 | 10 | Single engine monoplane sport airplane |
| RWD 10 | 1933 | ~23 | Single engine monoplane aerobatic airplane |
| RWD 11 | 1936 | 1 | Two engine monoplane feederliner |
| RWD-12 | N/A | 0 | Single engine monoplane trainer |
| RWD 13 | 1935 | ~100 | Single engine monoplane touring airplane |
| RWD-14 Czapla | 1936 | 4 (Note: An additional 65 production airframes were built by LWS.) | Single engine monoplane liaison airplane |
| RWD 15 | 1937 | 6 | Single engine monoplane touring airplane |
| RWD 16 | 1936 | 3+ | Single engine monoplane sport airplane |
| RWD 17 | 1937 | ~30 | Single engine monoplane trainer |
| RWD 18 | N/A | 1 | Two engine monoplane utility airplane |
| RWD-19 | 1938 | 1 | Single engine monoplane sport airplane |
| RWD 20 | 1937 | 1 | Single engine monoplane sport airplane |
| RWD 21 | 1939 | 6+ | Single engine monoplane sport airplane |
| RWD 22 | N/A | 0 | Two engine monoplane torpedo bomber floatplane |
| RWD 23 | 1939 | 1 | Single engine monoplane trainer |
| RWD 24 | N/A | 0 | Two engine monoplane torpedo bomber |
| RWD-25 | N/A | 0 | Single engine monoplane fighter |
| RWD-26 | N/A | 0 | Single engine monoplane trainer |
