= Messerschmitt M 17 =

German single-engine sports monoplane

M 17
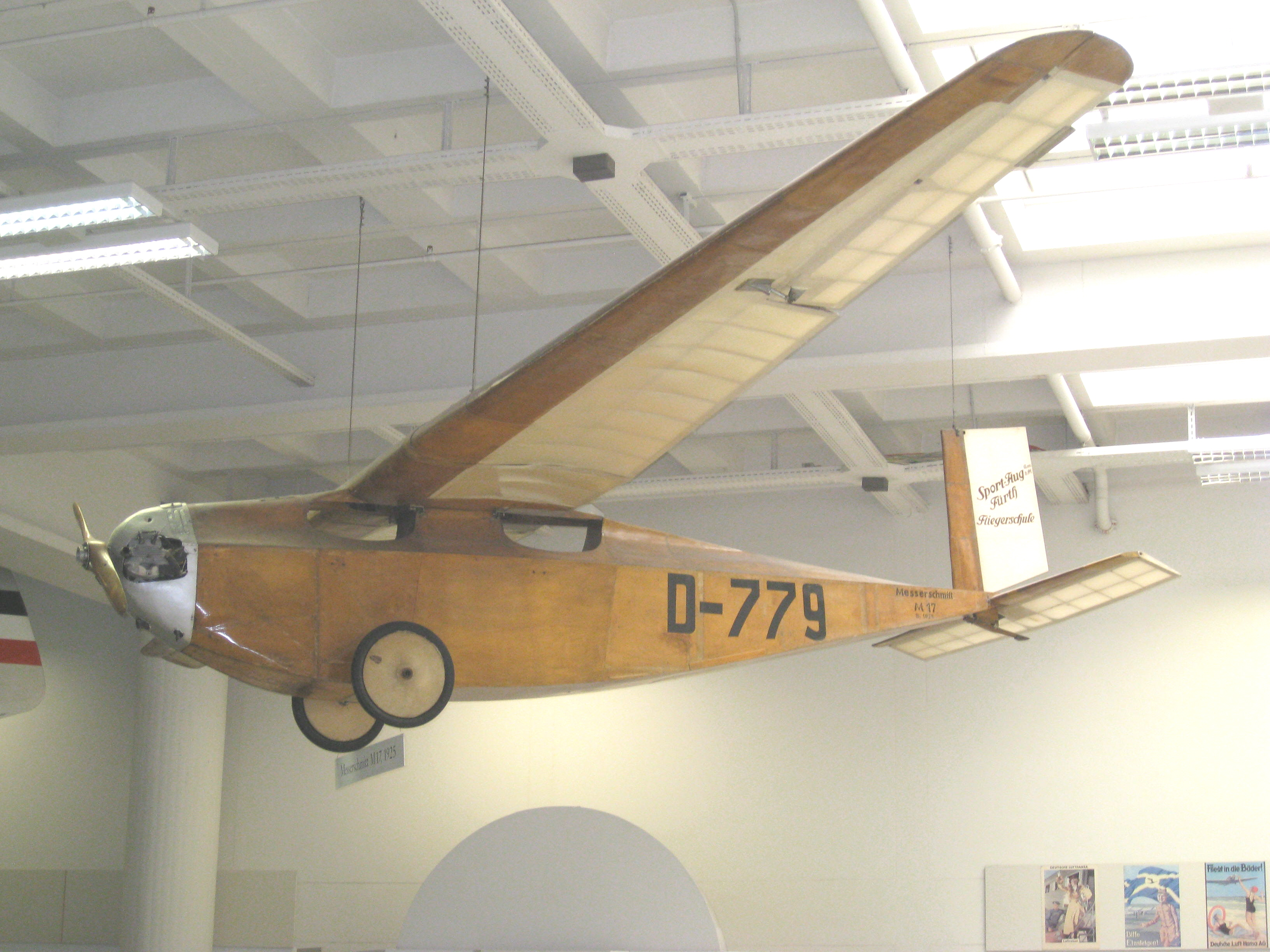
- Messerschmitt M17 in the Deutsches Museum, Munich

General information
- Type: Sports plane
- National origin: Germany
- Manufacturer: Flugzeugbau Messerschmitt Bamberg
- Designer: Willy Messerschmitt
- Primary user: Germany
- Number built: 8

History
- Introduction date: 1925
- First flight: January 1925

The M 17 was a German single-engine high-wing sports monoplane. It was designed by Willy Messerschmitt in 1925 in Bamberg. This aircraft won many competitions and allowed Willy Messerschmitt to build his first factory.

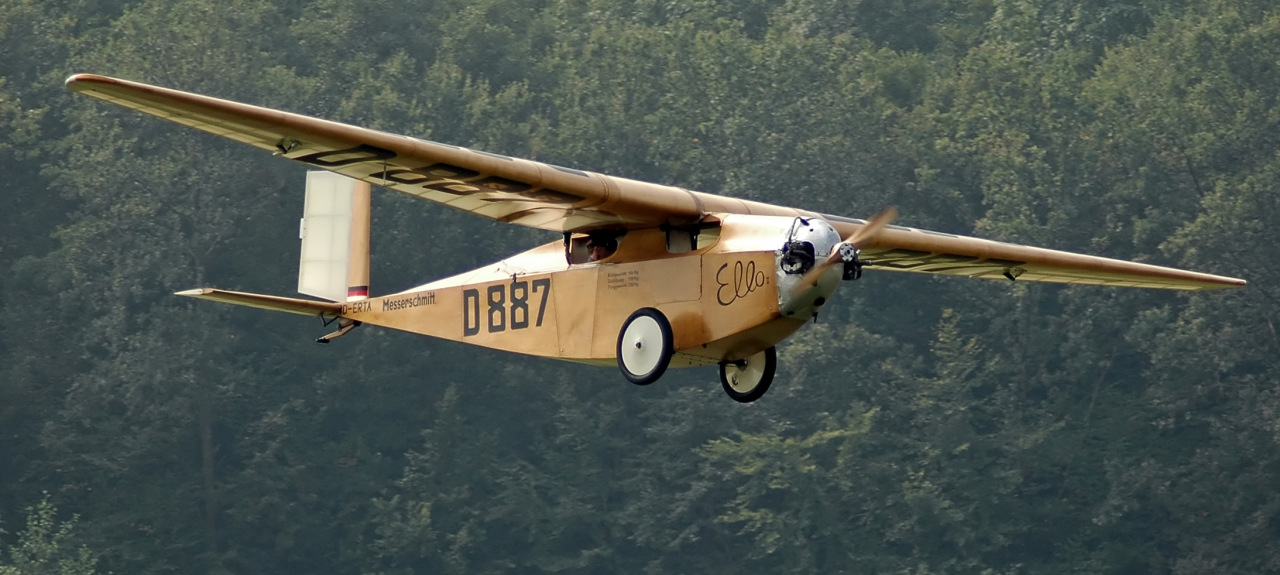
Messerschmitt M 17 Messerschmitt Foundation replica

Messerschmitt M 17 replica in flight

== Development ==
The design of the M 17 could be traced back via the powered S 16 and S 15 aircraft to the Messerschmitt-Hirth S 14 glider. The aircraft was a two-seater almost completely made of wood and weighed only 198 kg (437 lb). The engine was a 22 kW (29 hp) Bristol Cherub II. The pilot had no forward visibility.

In September 1926, pilot Eberhard von Conta, and the writer Werner von Langsdorff flew in an M 17 from Bamberg to Rome. This marked the first time the central Alps were crossed with a light aircraft. The flight lasted more than 14 hours and they had to refuel every three hours, since the tank could hold only 28 L (7 US gal). They reached an altitude of 4,500 m (14,760 ft).

== Survivors/Replicas ==
Only one of the six-eight machines built survived and is today in the Deutsches Museum in Munich.

A replica was built by the Messerschmitt Foundation (first flight April 14, 2004) and makes regular appearances at the International Aerospace Exhibition in Berlin. It weighs 40 kg (90 lb) more than the original due to additional equipment (radio and rescue system) and is now at the Manching Aviation Museum in Ingolstadt, Bavaria.

== Specifications ==
Data from

General characteristics

- Crew: 2
- Length: 5.85 m (19 ft 2 in)
- Wingspan: 11.6 m (38 ft 1 in)
- Height: 1.5 m (4 ft 11 in)
- Wing area: 10.4 m^{2} (112 sq ft)
- Airfoil: Göttingen 535
- Empty weight: 186 kg (410 lb)
- Max takeoff weight: 370 kg (816 lb)
- Fuel capacity: 28 L (7.4 US gal; 6.2 imp gal)
- Powerplant: 1 × Bristol Cherub II 2-cylinder air-cooled horizontally-opposed piston engine, 22 kW (29 hp)
- Propellers: 2-bladed fixed-pitch propeller

Performance

- Maximum speed: 140 km/h (87 mph, 76 kn)
- Cruise speed: 125 km/h (78 mph, 67 kn)
- Stall speed: 65 km/h (40 mph, 35 kn)
- Range: 600 km (370 mi, 320 nmi)
- Service ceiling: 4,000 m (13,000 ft)

== See also ==
Related development

- Volksflugzeug

Aircraft of comparable role, configuration, and era

- RWD 1
- RWD 2
