= RWD 7 =

Polish sports plane of 1931

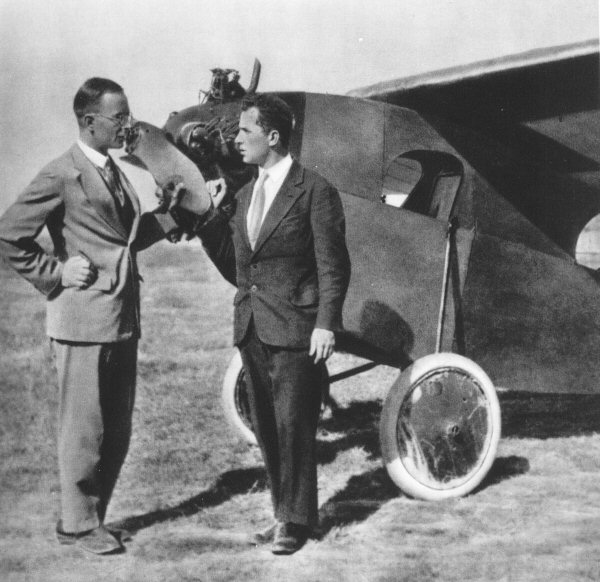
- Jerzy Drzewiecki and Jerzy Wędrychowski by the RWD 7

General information
- Type: Sports plane
- Manufacturer: Warsaw University of Technology workshops
- Designer: RWD team
- Primary user: Polish civilian aviation
- Number built: 1

History
- Introduction date: 1931
- First flight: July 1931
- Retired: 1938

The RWD 7 was a Polish sports plane of 1931, constructed by the RWD team.

== Development ==
The RWD 7 was constructed by the RWD team of Stanisław Rogalski, Stanisław Wigura and Jerzy Drzewiecki in Warsaw. It was based upon their earlier designs, especially the RWD 2 and RWD 4. The RWD 7 was meant to be a record-beating plane, so it had a more powerful engine, while its mass was reduced. From its predecessors, it took the same fish-shaped fuselage without a direct view towards forward from the pilot's seat.

The only RWD 7 built (registration SP-AGH) was flown in July 1931 by its designer Jerzy Drzewiecki. On August 12, 1931, Drzewiecki and Jerzy Wędrychowski established an international FAI speed record of 178 km/h (111 mph) in the light touring plane class, (below 280 kg / 616 lb empty weight). On September 30, 1932, Drzewiecki and Antoni Kocjan set a height record of 6,023 m (19,755 ft). The RWD 7 was used in Warsaw Aero Club, among others, for aerobatics, then in 1936 it was bought by a known aviator Zbigniew Babiński for touring flights and used until 1938.

The RWD 7 was known for its extremely short take-off run: with a single crew member only 18 m (59 ft), with two crew members, 30 m (98 ft).

== Description ==
The RWD 7 was a wooden construction, conventional in layout, high-wing cantilever monoplane. The fuselage was rectangular in cross-section (narrowing in upper part), plywood-covered, apart from the engine section, which was aluminium sheet-covered. The wings were trapezoid, single-spar, single part, canvas and plywood covered. A crew of two sat in tandem, with a pilot in the rear cab. The crew cabs were open on upper sides, and had doors on the right side. The engine was 5-cylinder Armstrong Siddeley Genet II radial engine, 56 kW (75 hp) nominal power. Two-blade wooden propeller of a fixed pitch. The plane had a conventional landing gear, with a rear skid. A 30 L fuel tank was in central part of wing. A cruise fuel consumption was 18 L/hour.

== Specifications ==
Data from Polskie konstrukcje lotnicze 1893–1939

General characteristics

- Crew: 1
- Capacity: 1 / 194 kg (428 lb)
- Length: 9.8 m (32 ft 2 in)
- Wingspan: 6.3 m (20 ft 8 in)
- Height: 2 m (6 ft 7 in)
- Wing area: 13.6 m^{2} (146 sq ft)
- Empty weight: 246 kg (542 lb)
- Gross weight: 440 kg (970 lb)
- Powerplant: 1 × Armstrong Siddeley Genet II 5-cylinder air-cooled radial piston engine, 56 kW (75 hp)
- Propellers: 2-bladed fixed-pitch propeller

Performance

- Maximum speed: 186 km/h (116 mph, 100 kn)
- Stall speed: 65 km/h (40 mph, 35 kn)
- Range: 260 km (160 mi, 140 nmi)
- Service ceiling: 6,000 m (20,000 ft)
- Wing loading: 32 kg/m^{2} (6.6 lb/sq ft)
- Power/mass: 0.23 kW/kg (0.14 hp/lb)
- Take-off run: 18–30 m (59–98 ft)

== See also ==
Related development

- RWD 1
- RWD 2
- RWD 3
- RWD 4
