= Zbigniew Babiński =

Zbigniew Juliusz Babiński
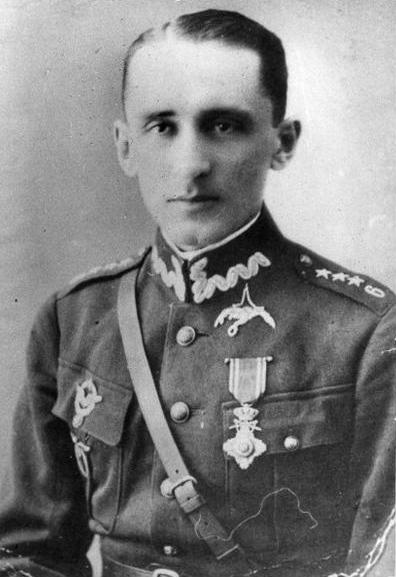
- Born: 13 May 1896; Sosnowiec, Poland
- Died: April 1940 (age 43); Katyn, USSR
- Occupation: Aviator

Zbigniew Juliusz Babiński (13 May 1896 – April 1940) was a Polish military and sports aviator.

He was born in Sosnowiec. While in school he constructed two simple biplane gliders in 1912 and 1913 in Milanówek. The first one crashed during pilotless tests, while the second one was used for short flights by Babiński and his friends (including later aircraft designer Władysław Zalewski). There is no information available on his service during World War I, but he probably received a pilot's training and served in the air force of one of the occupants of Poland.

In November 1918, as Poland regained its independence, Babiński took part in disarmament of German soldiers. He then joined the Polish Air Force with the rank of Flying 2nd Lieutenant (podporucznik pilot). He served in the 1st Scout Escadre (1 Eskadra Wywiadowcza) during the Polish-Soviet war, as a pilot of Bristol F.2 Fighter. Before and during the Battle of Warsaw he flew sorties strafing Soviet cavalry, particularly on 14 August 1920 near Pułtusk.

After the war, Babiński remained in service, in air units in Lwów, Bydgoszcz, Dęblin and Warsaw, and was promoted to the rank of Flying Captain. He participated in the first Polish air contest - the 1st Polish Circuit of 1922, taking third place.

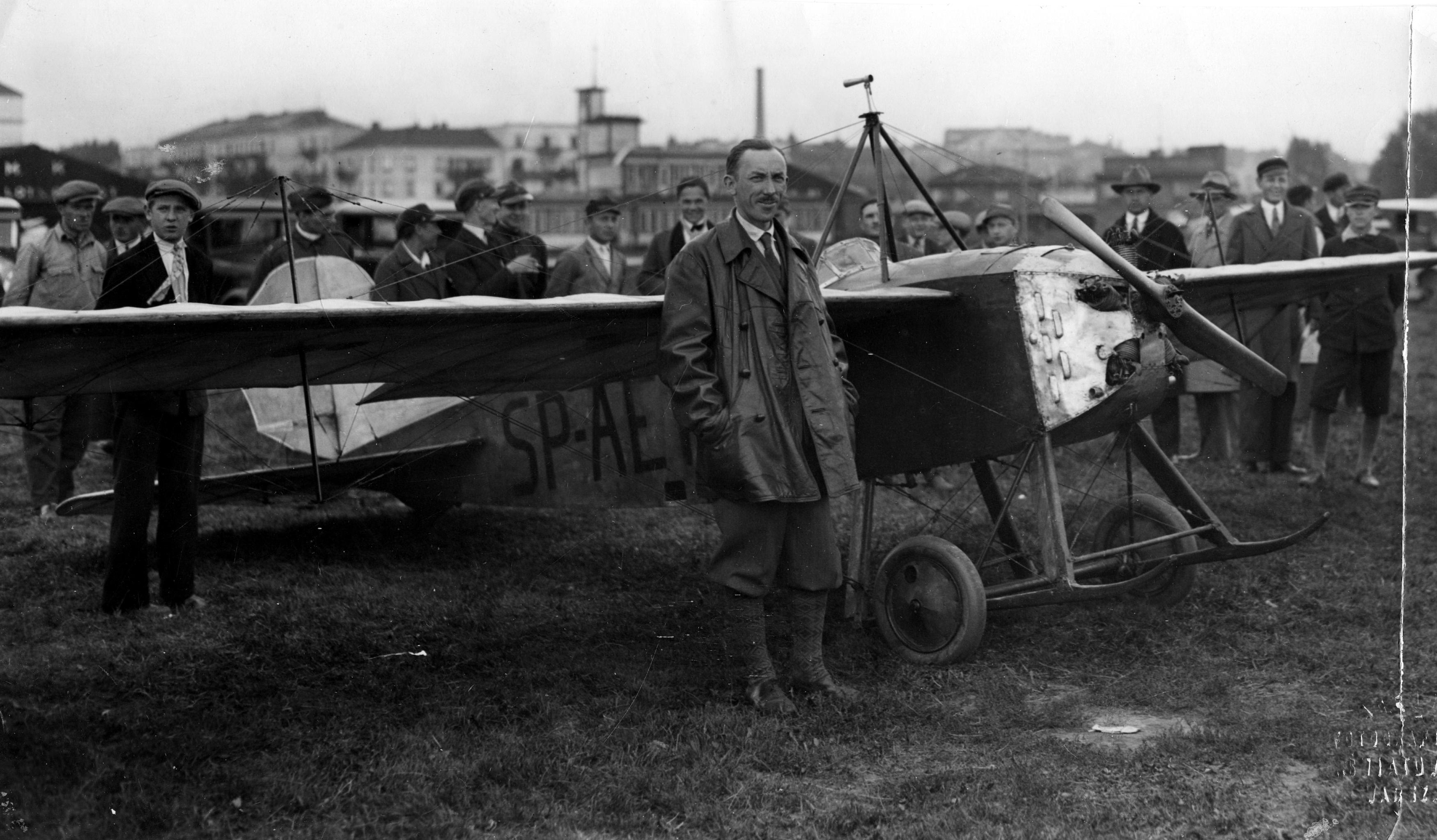
WZ-XI "Kogutek"

As a member of Warsaw Aero Club of the Polish Aero Club, he was especially active in developing Polish touring aviation. He was the first to fly amateur ultra-light aircraft D-1 Cykacz (1925) and WZ-XI Kogutek (1927, of Zalewski's design). In 1928 he undertook the first touring raid over Poland on the Kogutek, 600 km-long. Flying the Kogutek, he took part in the 2nd Polish Light Aircraft Contest in 1928 (taking 9th place) and in the 3rd Contest in 1930, from which he withdrew. After 1929, he bought a JD-2 (SP-ACA), with which he undertook many touring flights. Assessing the possibilities for light aviation, he landed with this aircraft in at least 225 places in Poland (according to other information, 330). In 1936, he bought a RWD-7 aircraft, and then a RWD-16. Until 1937, Zbigniew Babiński landed in about 400 casual places in Poland.

In July 1930, Zbigniew Babiński took part in the Challenge 1930 international contest, flying PWS-50, but was disqualified for time infringement, although he completed the circuit over Europe.

Zbigniew Babiński flew reconnaissance sorties during the Polish September campaign of World War II, the last one on 16 September 1939. After the Soviet invasion of Poland, he was taken captive on 17/18 September 1939, and was murdered in April 1940 by the NKVD in Katyn during the Katyn massacre.
