= RWD 3 =

Polish sports aircraft

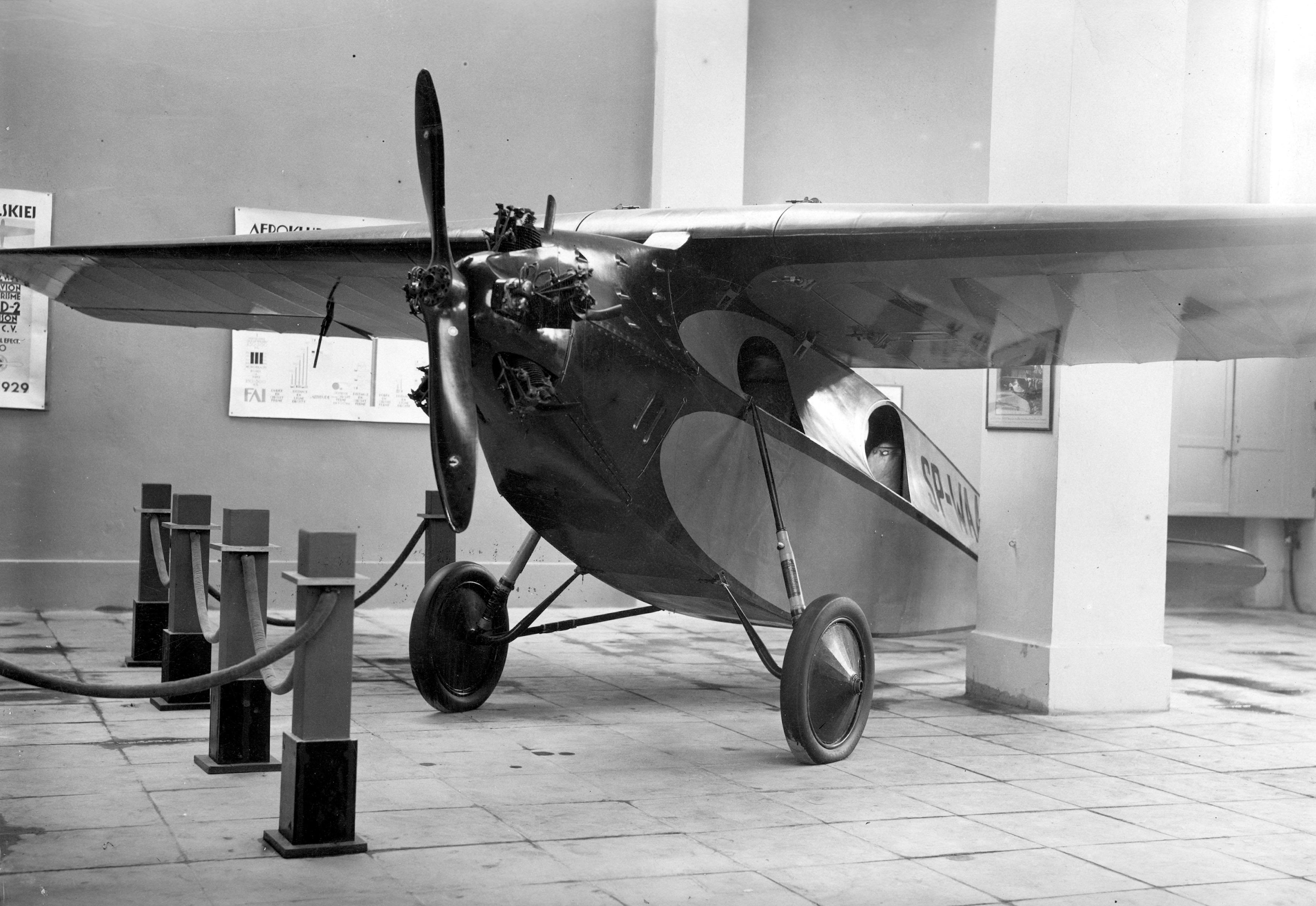

General information
- Type: Sports aircraft
- Manufacturer: Warsaw University of Technology workshops
- Designer: RWD team
- Primary user: Polish civilian aviation
- Number built: 1

History
- Introduction date: 1930
- First flight: April 1930

The RWD 3 was a 1930 Polish sports aircraft and liaison aircraft prototype. A single-engine high-wing monoplane, it was constructed by the RWD team.

== Development ==
The RWD 3 was constructed by the RWD team of Stanisław Rogalski, Stanisław Wigura and Jerzy Drzewiecki in Warsaw. Since their earlier design, the RWD 2 sports aircraft appeared quite successful, the Polish Military of Defence ordered in 1929 to develop its enlarged variant as a liaison aircraft. It retained the same fish-shaped fuselage without a direct view towards forward from the pilot's seat, though the view improved due to a thin fuselage profile before the pilot. At the same time, the RWD developed similar enlarged sports aircraft, the RWD 4, which shared many features with the RWD 3, but was powered with an inline engine and did not have folding wings.

One prototype was built for ground trials and one flying prototype. It was completed and flown by the designer Jerzy Drzewiecki in April 1930. Since it was found unsatisfactory as a liaison aircraft, it was handed over to sports aviation – Academic Aero Club in Warsaw, with the civil registration SP-WAA. It was used for training and in some competitions. Unlike the RWD 3, the RWD 4 appeared more successful design.

== Description ==
Wooden construction single-engine high-wing cantilever monoplane, conventional in layout. The fuselage was rectangular in cross section (triangular in upper part), plywood-covered. Two-spar wings, covered with canvas, in front with plywood, were folding rearwards, unlike other early RWDs. Cantilever empennage, covered with plywood (stabilizers) and canvas (rudder and elevators). Crew of two was sitting in tandem in the fuselage. The cockpits were open in upper part on the sides, with individual doors on the right side. 5-cylinder air-cooled 88 hp radial engine Armstrong Siddeley Genet (80 hp nominal power, 88 hp take-off power) was mounted in front and drove two-blade wooden propeller. Conventional fixed landing gear, with a rear skid. Fuel tank in central wing section.

== Specifications (RWD 3) ==
Data from

General characteristics

- Crew: 1
- Capacity: 1
- Length: 7 m (23 ft 0 in)
- Wingspan: 10.5 m (34 ft 5 in)
- Height: 2.26 m (7 ft 5 in)
- Wing area: 15 m^{2} (160 sq ft)
- Empty weight: 380 kg (838 lb)
- Gross weight: 560 kg (1,235 lb)
- Max takeoff weight: 690 kg (1,521 lb)
- Powerplant: 1 × Armstrong Siddeley Genet 5-cylinder air-cooled radial piston engine, 66 kW (88 hp)
- Propellers: 2-bladed fixed-pitch propeller

Performance

- Maximum speed: 170 km/h (110 mph, 92 kn)
- Cruise speed: 140 km/h (87 mph, 76 kn)
- Stall speed: 68 km/h (42 mph, 37 kn)
- Wing loading: 37 kg/m^{2} (7.6 lb/sq ft)

== See also ==
Related development

- RWD 2
- RWD 4
- RWD 7
