= Stanisław Wigura =

Polish aircraft designer and aviator (1901-1932)

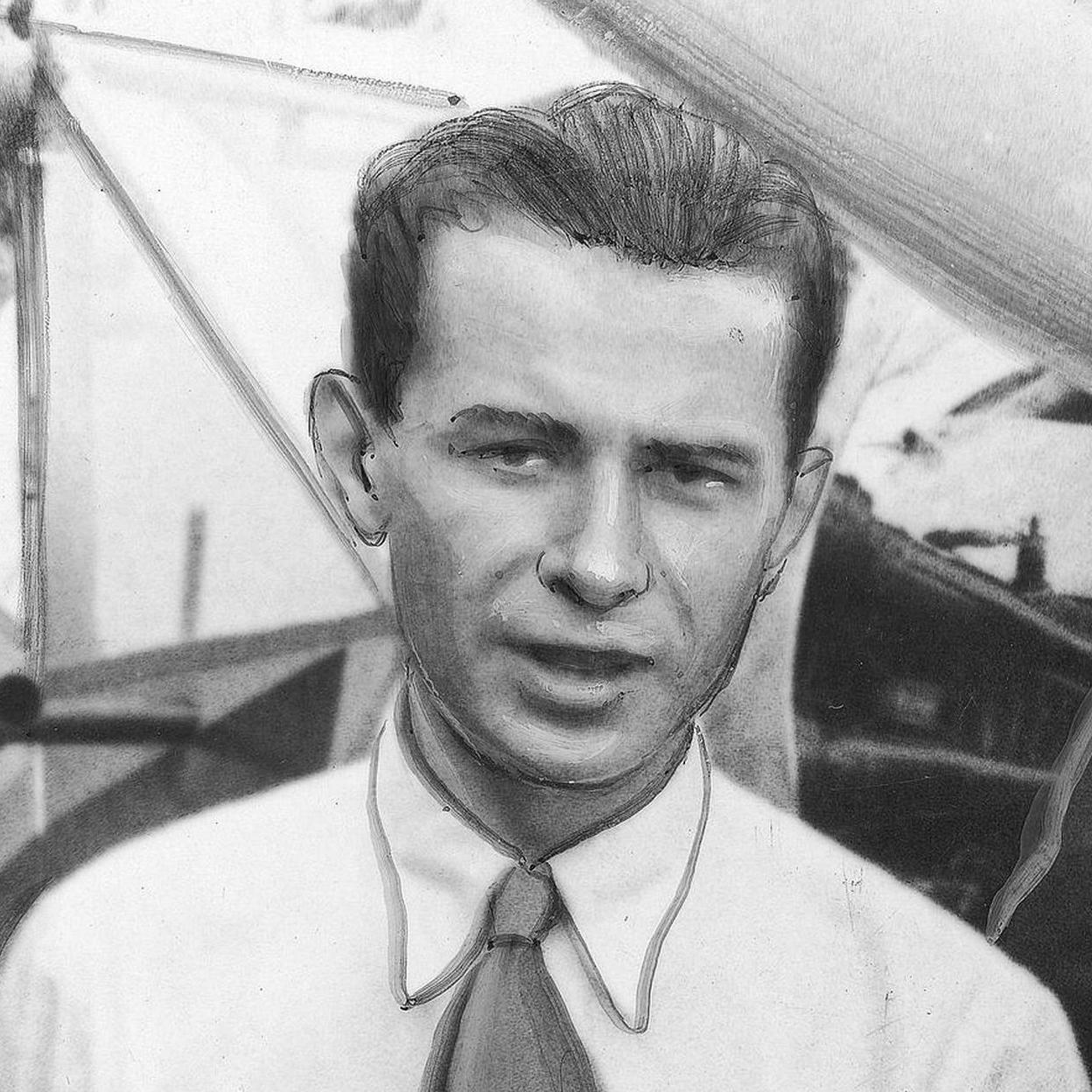
- Stanisław Wigura in 1932
- Born: April 9, 1901; Warsaw, Congress Poland
- Died: September 11, 1932 (aged 31); Těrlicko, Czechoslovakia
- Resting place: Powązki Cemetery
- Education: Warsaw University of Technology
- Occupations: Aviator, aircraft designer

Stanisław Wigura (9 April 1901 – 11 September 1932) was a Polish aircraft designer and aviator, co-founder of the RWD aircraft construction team and lecturer at the Warsaw University of Technology. Along with Franciszek Żwirko, he won the international air contest Challenge 1932.

== Biography ==
Wigura was born in Warsaw. In his youth he was interested in mechanics and aviation, and he was also a Boy Scout. In 1920, during the Polish-Soviet War, he volunteered for the 8th Field Artillery Regiment. In 1921, he started studies at Warsaw University of Technology (Warsaw Tech), where he met Stanislaw Rogalski and Jerzy Drzewiecki. He was one of the founders of the Aviation Section of Students' Mechanical Club. In December 1925, students of the Section founded their own workshop, where they built aircraft. In 1926, Wigura and Rogalski designed their first light aircraft WR-1, built in 1927.

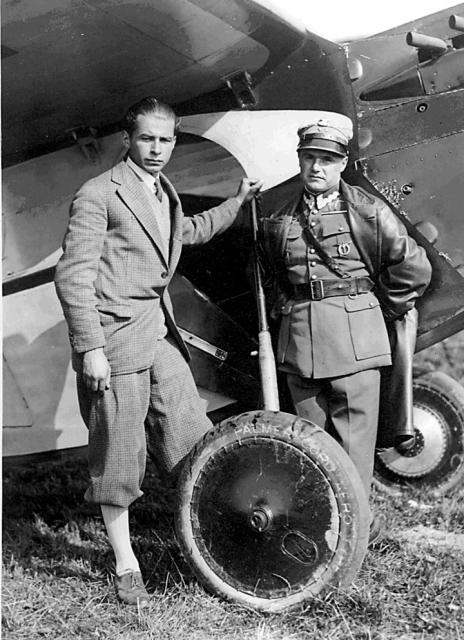
Stanisław Wigura (left) and Franciszek Żwirko

In 1927, three designers: Rogalski, Wigura, and Drzewiecki started working together, creating the RWD team (it was an acronym of their names). Wigura's task was for all the initial design calculations and development. In 1928, they built their first sportsplane RWD-1. In 1929, Wigura graduated from Warsaw Tech, receiving the Engineer title. In the same year, he completed a pilot course in the Academic Aeroclub. The RWD team began constructing more successful aircraft - sportsplane RWD-2 of 1929 (4 built) and the bigger RWD-4 of 1930 (9 built). They were used in Polish sports aviation, with some success.

Wigura himself became active in sports aviation. It was thanks to his friendship with 8-years-older pilot Franciszek Żwirko, assigned by the military as a liaison officer in the Aeroclub. They often flew together, Wigura as a mechanic and second pilot. Between August 9 and September 6, 1929, Żwirko and Wigura flew on the RWD-2 prototype across Europe, on a Warsaw-Paris-Barcelona-Milan-Warsaw route of 5,000 kilometers. On October 6 they won a Polish air race. In July 1930, Żwirko and Wigura took part in the International Tourist Plane Competition (Challenge 1930), flying the RWD-4, but they had to withdraw on July 25 due to engine failure after a compulsory landing in Spain. During September and October 1930, they won in two Polish contests, flying on RWD-2 and RWD-4, and in September 1931, they won another one, flying on a prototype RWD-5.

In the meantime, Wigura with others designed further aircraft: liaison plane RWD-3 in 1930 (one built), record sportsplane RWD-7 in 1931, and a sportsplane RWD-5 in 1931. The latter was made famous as the lightest plane that made a transatlantic flight (20 built). He also started designing the RWD-8 basic trainer. In 1932, he developed a modern sportsplane, the RWD-6, that was intended for the International Tourist Plane Competition (Challenge 1932), which took place between August 20–28, 1932. Żwirko, intended as a pilot, chose Wigura as his crewmate. They won a competition, over the heavily favored German and other teams, and both became heroes in Poland. The success was brought by Żwirko's piloting skills and the high quality and performance of the plane.

On 11 September 1932, while flying to an air meet in Prague, Żwirko and Wigura were killed when their RWD-6 crashed in a forest near Cierlicko, close to Cieszyn, after one of its wings failed during a severe storm. A monument marking the crash site was erected shortly afterwards and became known as Żwirkowisko.

== Honours and awards ==
Stanislaw Wigura was awarded the Knight's Cross of the Order of Polonia Restituta and the Polish Gold Cross of Merit.
