= Airborne and Antigas Defence League =

Polish paramilitary organization

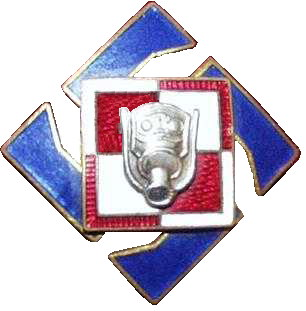
League's pinup, with the interbellum logo

Air and Chemical Defense League (Polish: Liga Obrony Powietrznej i Przeciwgazowej, L.O.P.P.) was a mass Polish paramilitary organization, founded in 1928 as a result of the merger of the State Air Defense League (Polish: Liga Obrony Powietrznej Panstwa) with the Gas Defense Society (Polish: Towarzystwo Obrony Przeciwgazowej). In 1937 it numbered some 1.5 million members, with 14,000 local branches. It had a national character, gathering enthusiasts of aircraft, communications and ballooning. Between 1928 and 1939, its director was general Leon Berbecki.

== State Air Defense League ==
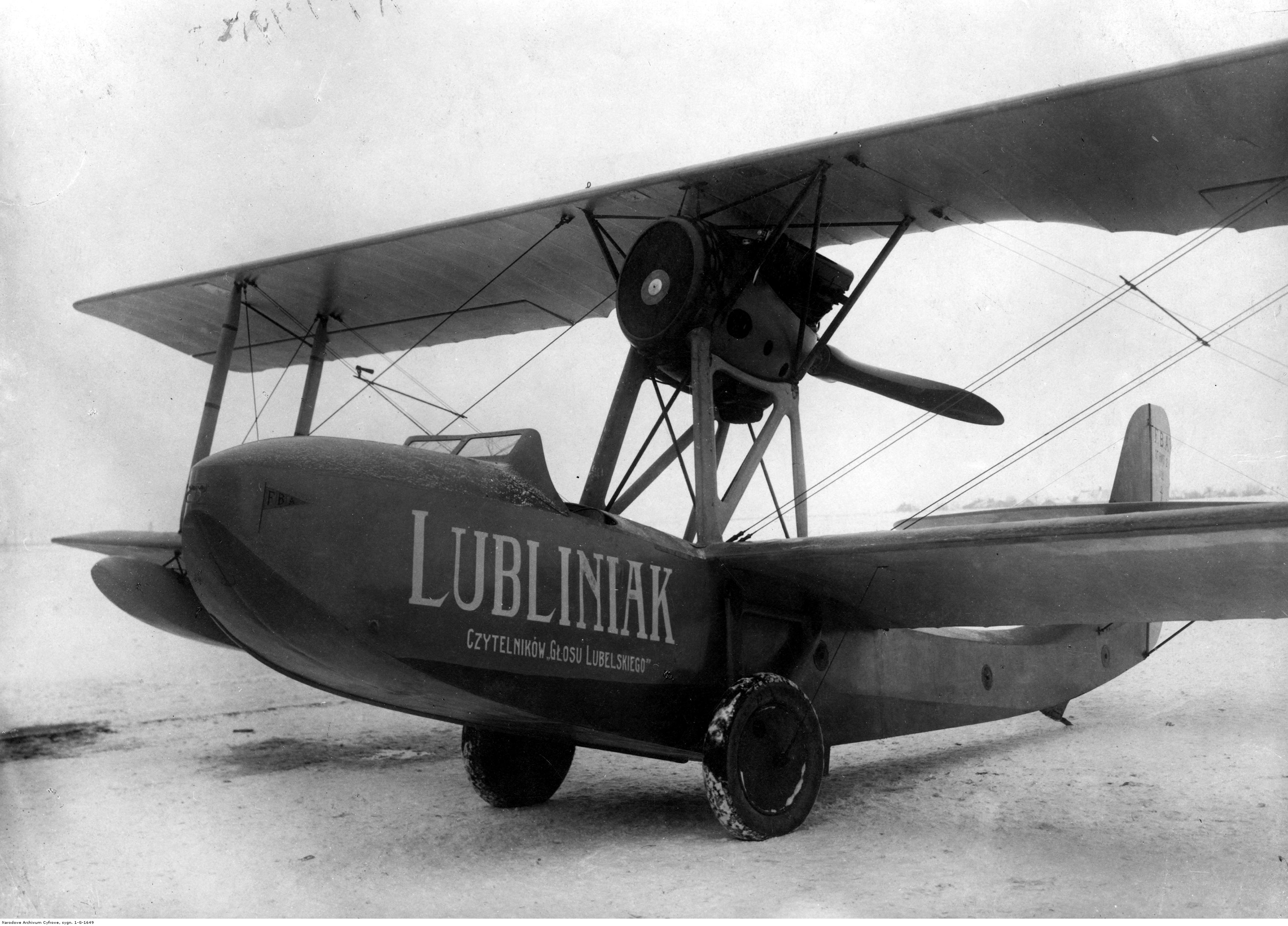
Lubliniak, 1925 (photograph Ludwik Hartwig)

The State Air Defense League was formed by members of the Polish Aero Club and Andrzej Strug. By 1925 A Schreck FBA 17 HMT2 was operated by LOPP with funds raised by contributions from the readers of Głos Lubelski.

== After the merger ==
The League backed in all possible ways purchases of aviation equipment, development of aircraft as well as various airforce-oriented publications. Its members helped with construction of airfields, parachute towers, and League's activities, aimed at youth, helped the nation understand and support the aircraft. It had its logo, anthem, flag, pinups, seals and medals. Its honorary director was president Ignacy Mościcki.

In the summer of 1939, L.O.P.P organized mass anti-German demonstrations in several Polish cities and towns.

After World War II, in 1951, the League was recreated under the new name, Territorial Air Defense (Terenowa Obrona Przeciwlotnicza).
