= Stanisław Rogalski =

Polish aircraft designer (1904–1976)

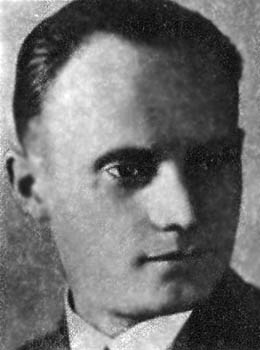
Polish aircraft engineer Stanislaw Rogalski

Stanisław Rogalski (25 May 1904 – 6 February 1976) was a Polish aircraft designer, born in Olomouc, best known as one of the founding trio (the other two being Stanisław Wigura and Jerzy Drzewiecki) of the inter-war period RWD airplane factory in Warsaw. He obtained his degree at Warsaw University of Technology. During World War II he became technical director at the Turkish Aeronautical Association factory. In 1949 he moved to the United States, where he ended his career at Grumman as an aerodynamics expert.
