= Jerzy Drzewiecki =

Polish aerospace engineer (1902–1990)

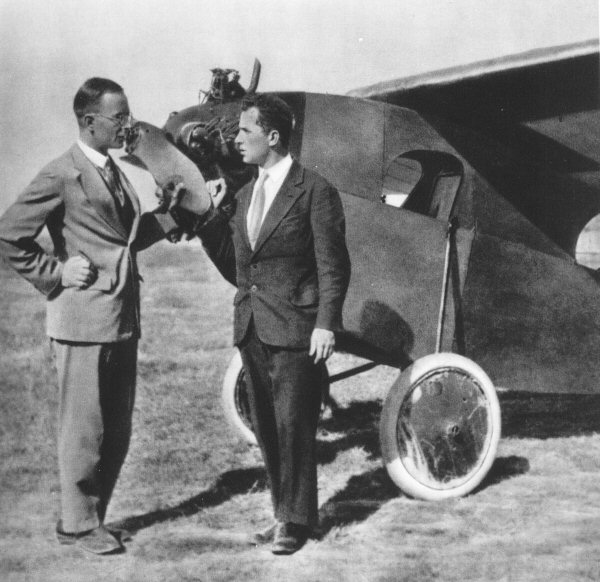
Drzewiecki (left) in front of his RWD-7

Jerzy Drzewiecki (7 August 1902 – 15 May 1990) was a Polish aeroplane constructor, engineer and one of the founders of the RWD construction bureau, along with Rogalski and Wigura. He was born in Warsaw. Among his most notable constructions is the RWD-7 aeroplane.

During World War II he went to Britain and became a ferry pilot with the Air Transport Auxiliary, taking new and damaged aircraft from one airfield to another.

He went on to live in Canada, where he died in 1990 in Ottawa.
