= Dov Hoz =

Israeli aviation pioneer (1894–1940)

- דב הוז
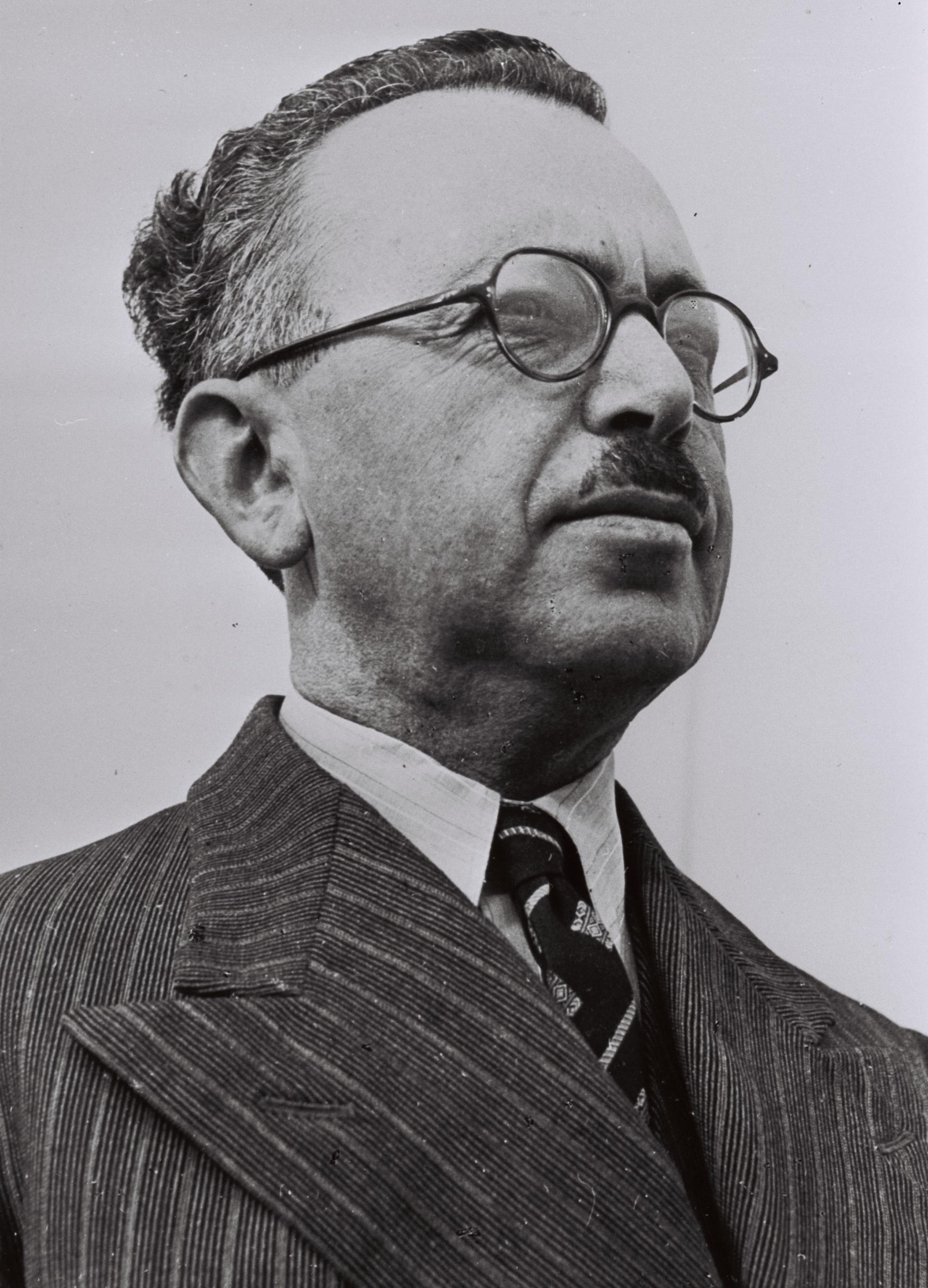
- Dov Hoz
- Born: September 19, 1894; Orsha, Mogilev Governorate, Russian Empire (present-day Belarus)
- Died: December 29, 1940 (aged 46); Pardesiya, Mandatory Palestine
- Occupations: Zionist leader, pioneer of Israeli aviation
- Known for: Founder of Haganah, Aviron Aviation Company
- Spouse: Rivka Sharett
- Children: Tirza Hoz

Dov Hoz (Hebrew: דב הוז; September 19, 1894 - December 29, 1940) was a leader of the Labor Zionism movement, one of the founders of the Haganah organization, and a pioneer of Israeli aviation.

== Biography ==
Born in Orsha, Russian Empire, in 1894, Hoz immigrated to Ottoman Palestine as a child along with his family in 1906. Beginning in 1909, he was part of the group that organized guarding activity of the town of Tel Aviv. The group included Shaul Meirov-Avigur, Eliyahu Golomb and Moshe Sharett. During World War I, Hoz volunteered for service in the Ottoman Army and became an officer in a unit stationed near Damascus. Following the death of his father, he received bereavement leave but after the Tel Aviv and Jaffa deportation decided to desert. He did not return to his unit and engaged in activities to strengthen the Yishuv's self-defense capacity, smuggling weapons while wearing an Ottoman officer's uniform. After discovering that he had been sentenced to death, he initially hid in plain sight, joining an Ottoman Army expedition to survey water sources in the Syrian desert. He then spent weeks hiding in the deserted houses of Tel Aviv and orchards of Petah Tikva before fleeing to the south of Palestine which had just been conquered by the British and becoming an organizer for the Jewish Legion.

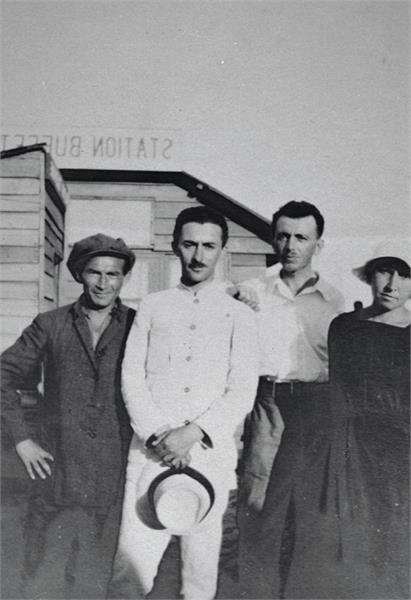
Hoz with Sharett 1930

From 1920 to 1930, Hoz was a member of the central Haganah committee. From 1931 to 1940, he was a member of the national Haganah command center. He went on to become one of the heads of the labor movement and a founding member of the socialist Ahdut HaAvoda party. In 1935 he was appointed vice-mayor of Tel-Aviv, and later head of the state department of the Histadrut (Labor Federation).

Hoz died in a car accident in December 1940. He was on his way to an Aviron board meeting. He was traveling with his wife Rivka (sister of Moshe Sharett, who later became Israel's second prime minister) and his daughter Tirza. Also in the car were his sister-in-law Tzvia Sharett and Aviron co-founder Yitzhak Ben-Ya'akov. All five people were killed in the accident.

== Aviation ==
Hoz and Yitzhak Ben Ya'akov from Degania Alef were the founders of Aviron Aviation Company, for which Hoz acted as CEO. Aviron was one of a handful of aviation pioneering enterprises of the Yishuv, created with its foreseeable security needs in mind. It trained pilots and established flight lines in Mandatory Palestine and outside, while serving as cover for the budding, tiny and illegal "air force" of the Yishuv, eventually organised between 1945 and 10 November 1947 as Palmach's Palavir, and then until Independence as the Haganah's Sherut Avir.

== Legacy and commemoration ==
One year after Hoz's death, on Hanukkah 1941, Kibbutz Dorot was established in the Negev by German Jewish refugees. They dedicated their new home to the memory of the Hoz family. (Dorot is an acronym formed by the first letters of the names Dov, Rivka and Tirza.) Many national and local institutions and streets throughout Israel have been named in memory of Dov Hoz in the years since his tragic death. Tel Aviv's former city airport, Sde Dov Airport, was also named after him.
