= Pinchas Ben-Porat =

Pinchas ("Pini") Ben-Porat
- פנחס ("פיני") בן-פורת
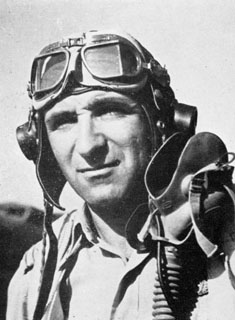
- Pinchas Ben-Porat

Pinchas ("Pini") Ben-Porat (Hebrew: פנחס בן פורת; October 10, 1914 - July 27, 1955) was one of Israel's first aviators. He was involved in the Palavir, Sherut Avir, the IAF's 101 Squadron, and EL AL.

== History ==
Pinchas Ben-Porat was born in Krevoe Ozero, a small shtetl (Jewish village) in Ukraine. He was born Pinchas Anchipolovsky. He immigrated to Palestine in 1921.

Pinchas Ben-Porat earned his flying license at the Aviron flying school, the Yishuv's flying school before the establishment of the State of Israel. After acquiring 150 hours of flying time, he became the commander for Palmach's air platoon, the Palavir, in January 1944. The Palmach later sent him for further training in England, where he earned a commercial flying license.

Ben-Porat returned to Palestine in 1947 and joined the Sherut Avir. On December 17, 1947, Ben-Porat was assigned a support role to Nevatim, a Jewish settlement in the Negev desert. When Nevatim came under attack by Arab irregulars, Ben-Porat flew an RWD 13 or Auster to Nevatim. Upon arriving, he removed the right door of the plane and set up a Bren gun and gunner with several hand grenades. Ben-Porat and his gunner flew a half-hour of close air support. The tactic was emulated by many Jewish pilots and crew in the 1947–1949 Palestine war.

On May 9, 1948, Ben-Porat was one of ten pilots who left Israel to enroll in Avia S-199 training in Czechoslovakia. He broke his arm crash-landing an S-199 and flew transports during the first truce of the 1947–1949 Palestine war. After the war he flew B-17s with 69 Squadron, which he eventually went on to command.

After the war, Ben-Porat was the first Israeli instructor in the Israeli Air Force flight academy. After a further tour flying B-17s, he left the military in 1950 and joined the Israeli state-owned commercial airline, El Al. On July 27, 1955, while co-pilot on El Al Flight 402, he was shot down by the Bulgarian Air Force; all on board were killed.
