= David Golomb =

Israeli politician (1933–2019)

- דוד גולומב
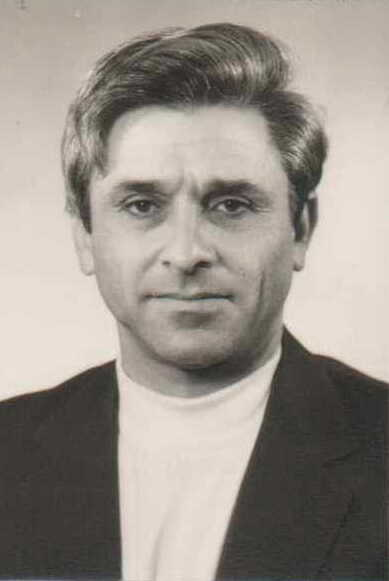

Faction represented in the Knesset
- 1968–1969: Labor Party
- 1969: Alignment
- 1977–1978: Democratic Movement for Change
- 1978–1980: Shinui
- 1980–1981: Alignment

Personal details
- Born: 4 February 1933; Tel Aviv, Mandatory Palestine
- Died: 27 June 2019 (aged 86)

David Golomb (Hebrew: דוד גולומב; 4 February 1933 – 27 June 2019) was an Israeli politician who served as a member of the Knesset for the Alignment, Labor Party, Democratic Movement for Change and Shinui in two spells between 1968 and 1969, and again from 1977 until 1981.

== Biography ==
Golomb was born in Tel Aviv during the Mandate era to Eliyahu Golomb, the man who formed the Haganah, and his mother Ada was the sister of future Israeli Prime Minister Moshe Sharett. He studied economics at the Hebrew University of Jerusalem. In 1961 he was appointed director of the Institute of Economic Research of the Actions Committee of the Histadrut, and in 1965 became director of the Planning Centre. He also headed the planning section of Koor Industries.

A member of Mapai, Golomb was on the Alignment list (a joint list run by Mapai and Ahdut HaAvoda) for the 1965 elections. Although he failed to win a seat, he entered the Knesset on 9 December 1968 (as a Labor Party MK due to the merger of Mapai, Ahdut HaAvoda and Rafi) as a replacement for Dov Sadan, who had resigned. He lost his seat in the elections the following year.

In 1977 Golomb joined the new Democratic Movement for Change party, and was placed eleventh on its list for the elections that year. He was subsequently elected as the party won 15 seats. When the party split in 1978 he joined Shinui, but on 13 May 1980, he and Meir Amit defected to the Alignment. He lost his seat again in the 1981 elections, and later worked for the Dan Bus Company.

He was married to Miriam (who died in 2002), and had three children.

He died on 27 June 2019.
