= Air Service =

Air service may refer to:

- Airline, a form of air transport services for passengers or freight, generally with a recognized operating certificate or license
- Sherut Avir, the air force of the Haganah and the forerunner of the Israeli Air Force
- United States Army Air Service, (1918-1926) forerunner of U.S. Air Force
