= RWD 13 =

Polish touring plane of 1935

RWD-13
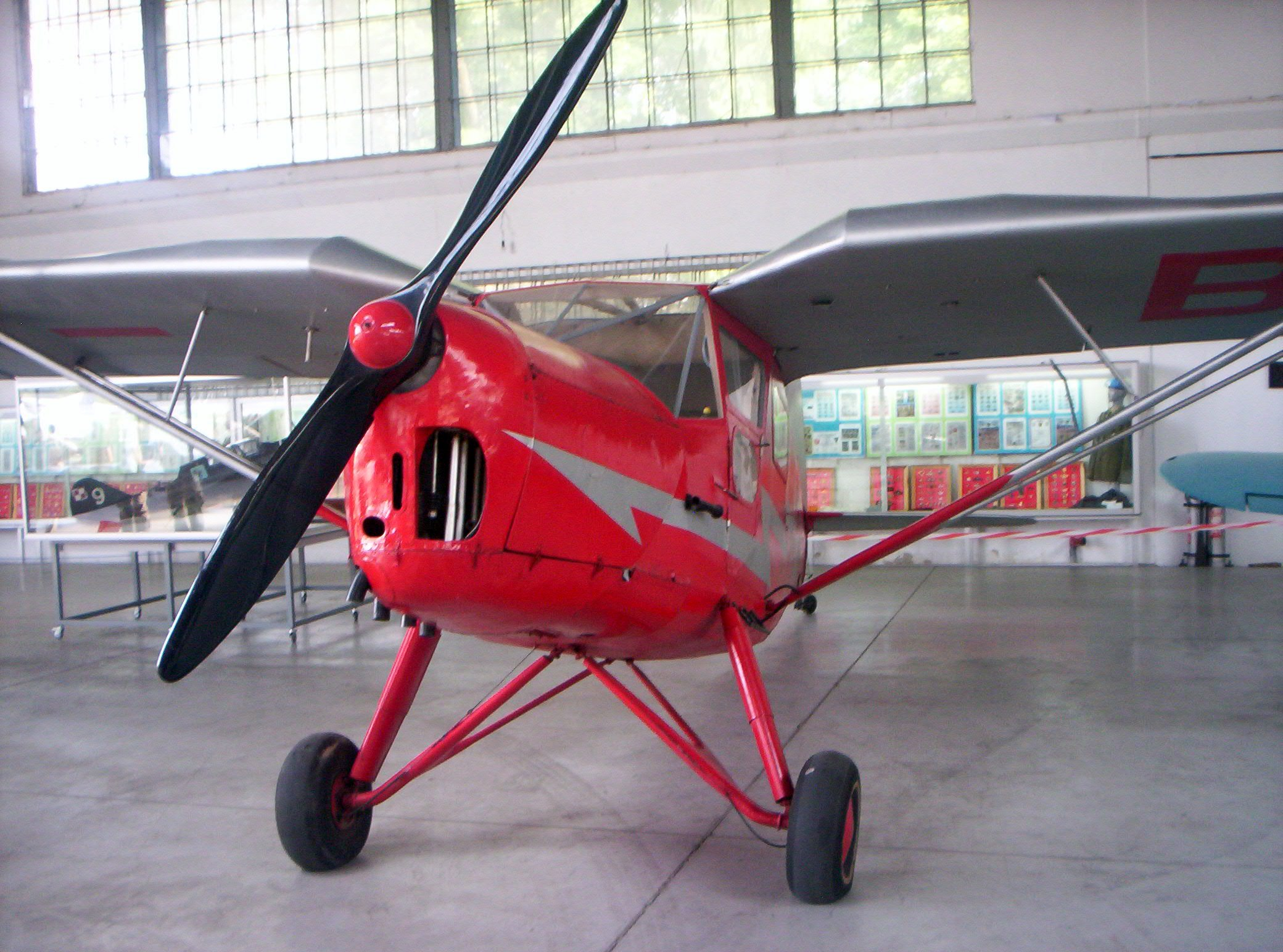
- RWD 13 in the Polish Aviation Museum

General information
- Type: Touring plane
- National origin: Poland
- Manufacturer: DWL Poland and Rogozarski Yugoslavia
- Designer: RWD team
- Primary users: Poland Yugoslavia; Romania; Brazil
- Number built: approx. 100

History
- Manufactured: 1935-1939
- Introduction date: 1935
- First flight: 15 January 1935
- Developed from: RWD-9

The RWD 13 was a Polish touring plane of 1935, three-seater high-wing monoplane, designed by the RWD team. It was the biggest commercial success of the RWD.

== Development ==
The RWD 13 was a touring plane, developed from a line of sports planes RWD 6 (a winner of Challenge 1932 international touring aircraft contest) and RWD 9 (a winner of Challenge 1934). It was designed by Stanisław Rogalski and Jerzy Drzewiecki of the RWD team, in the DWL workshops (Doświadczalne Warsztaty Lotnicze) in Warsaw, for and order of the LOPP paramilitary organization. The prototype was constructed using parts of a broken up RWD 6 (initially it was even supposed to be designated RWD 6bis), but its construction was more similar to newer RWD 9. It first flew on 15 January 1935 (registration SP-AOA). Since the RWD 13 was not supposed to be a competition aircraft, the main differences from the RWD 9 were: an inline engine with lower power output, instead of a radial engine, and simpler wing mechanization. It still had advantages, like short take-off and landing and ease of flying, with good stability. By 1939, some 85 were produced.

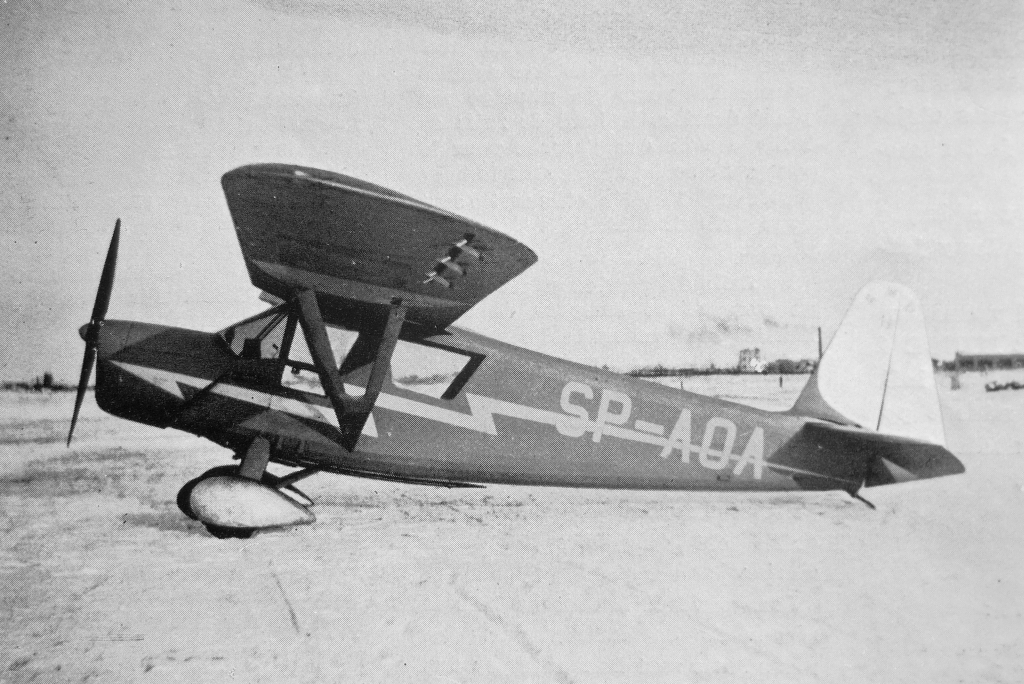
RWD 13 with Walter Major 4 (SP-AOA), first flight on January 15, 1935

In 1937 an air ambulance variant RWD 13S was built (prototype markings SP-BFN), with a starboard hatch for stretchers in the fuselage. There was also developed a similar universal variant RWD 13TS (or ST, or S/T), that could be converted from a touring plane to an ambulance by removing the right-hand seat. By 1939, 15 RWD 13S were made, including a few RWD 13TS. A development of the RWD 13 was the five-seater RWD 15.

A licence was sold to Yugoslavia in 1938 and made four RWD 13, and two RWD 13s were produced 1939 there by Rogožarski. All four RWD 13s were converted in 1939 into ambulance RWD 13S aircraft.

A flying replica of the RWD 13 is under construction in Poland (as of 2008).

=== Design ===
Three-seater sports and touring strutted high-wing monoplane of a mixed construction. A fuselage of a metal frame, covered with canvas, in engine section with aluminium sheets. Two-spar rectangular wing of wooden construction, covered with canvas and plywood in front. Wings folded rearwards, and were equipped with automatic slats. Cantilever empennage, covered with plywood (stabilizers) and canvas (rudder and elevators). Closed cabin with three seats: two front seats fitted with dual controls, behind them a third seat and a space for a luggage. The cabin had a pair of doors. In RWD 13S there were two seats on the left side, and stretchers on the right. The single engine in front was a 4-cylinder air-cooled inverted straight engine 130 hp Walter Major 4, PZInż. Major (licensed Walter Major), or a de Havilland Gipsy Major. The propeller was a two-blade wooden Szomański of a fixed pitch. The landing gear was conventional, with a rear skid. The fuel tanks were in the wings with a capacity of 140 L. Fuel consumption of the aircraft was 28 litres/hour.

== Operational history ==
=== Poland ===
Most RWD 13s were used by the Polish civilian aviation, initially, the Polish Aero Club (they were funded by the Ministry of Communication or the LOPP paramilitary organization - Air and Anti-gas Defence League). Three were used by the Ministry of Communication as utility aircraft, two were used by the LOT Polish Airlines, and several were in hands of private owners and companies.

The Polish Aero Club aircraft were also used for sport flying, taking part in numerous international contests and rallies, taking high places. Among others, they took the 1st, 4th, 6th and 7th places in a touring aircraft competition during the 4th International Air Meeting in Zurich in 1937. The RWD 13S won a prize of Esch town for the best air ambulance of an International Ambulance Aircraft Contest in Esch, Luxembourg in July 1938 (the contest itself was won by another Polish plane, the LWS-2).

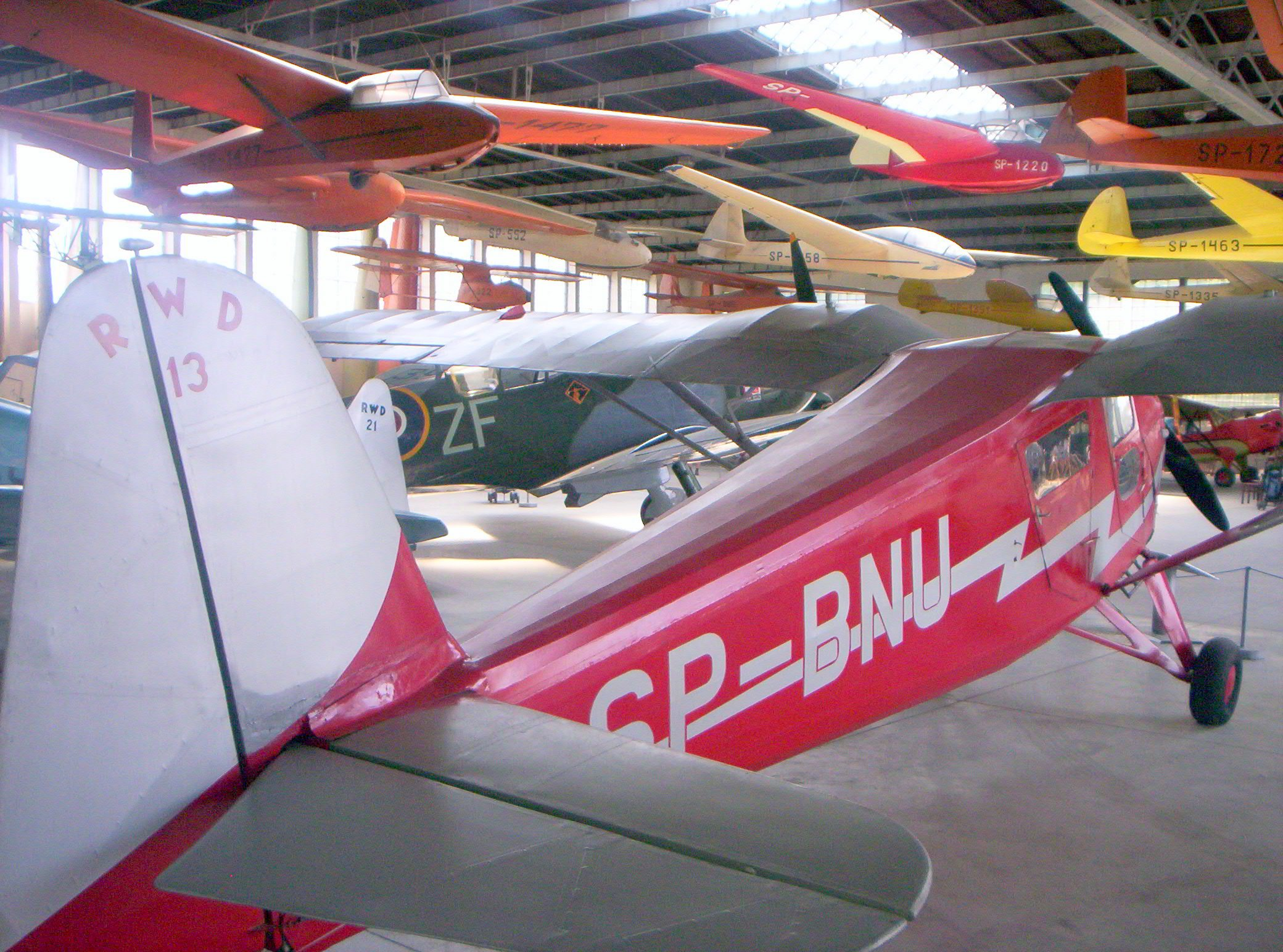
RWD 13 'SP-BNU' in the Polish Aviation Museum

Most air ambulances RWD 13S belonged to the Polish Red Cross, five to the Polish Air Force, but they carried civilian markings as well. Several (at least five) RWD 13, not counting air ambulances, were mobilized after the start of World War II and used as liaison aircraft during the Polish September Campaign. Some aircraft were evacuated to neighbouring countries, some were destroyed or seized by the Germans.

Most Polish RWD 13 were painted red, with a silver lightning painted on a fuselage and silver wings. RWD 13S were painted in ivory, with Red Cross markings, while RWD 13TS were painted in ivory, with a red lightning on the fuselage.

Only four RWD 13 were used in Poland after the war, that were returned by Romania in 1947 (in 1948 the Polish communist government lost interest in all Polish pre-war equipment remaining abroad). They were used until 1953-1955, with registrations: SP-MSZ (owned by the Ministry of Foreign Affairs, MSZ in short), SP-ARG, SP-ARH, SP-ARL. SP-ARL is currently preserved in the Polish Aviation Museum in Kraków, with its pre-war registration SP-BNU (formerly used by LOT Polish Airlines).

=== Spain ===
Around 20 RWD 13s were exported before World War II. Four were sold to Spain by SEPEWE and were used as liaison aircraft by Franco's Aviación Nacional during the Spanish Civil War, under the name Polaca (numbers: 30-1 - 30-4). After the civil war, the remaining ones were used in aero clubs.

=== Brasil ===
In 1937-1938, eight RWD 13 were sold to Brazil and used there until the 1960s. One of them still remains in airworthy condition (PT-LFY).

=== Palestine/Israel ===
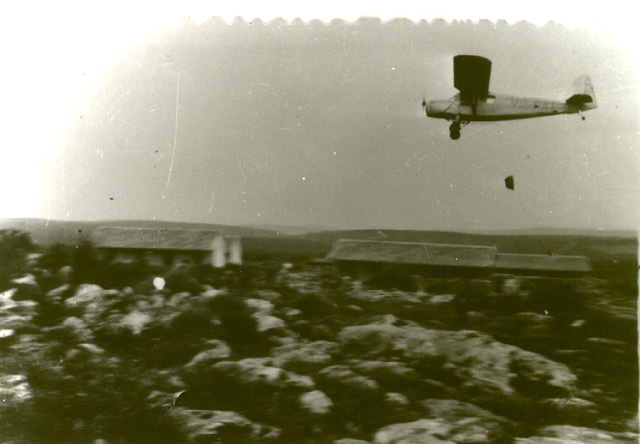
VQ-PAL dropping supplies to isolated Yehiam, northern Palestine, January 1948

Two or three RWD 13 were sold to Jewish owners in Palestine. With the formation of the Sherut Avir, the air arm of the Haganah, in November 1947 two were included in its inventory. On 17 December 1947, one of them undertook the first air attack, with hand grenades and handguns, during the Israeli-Arab skirmishes (earlier, on 15 June 1936, an RWD 13 was the first aircraft to land in Tel Aviv). The two RWD 13s were among the first aircraft of the newly created Israeli Air Force, and were used for liaison and transport during the 1948 Arab-Israeli War.

=== Romania ===
After the outbreak of World War II, 28 Polish RWD 13 were evacuated to Romania (23 RWD 13 and 5 RWD 13S). After the fall of Poland, they were taken over by Romanian civil and military aviation. After Romania joined the war on the Axis side and took part in the attack on the USSR, RWD 13 were used as liaison aircraft by the Air Force. Especially famous were air ambulances, used by the "Escadrila Albă" (White Squadron), flown by women. Twenty-one survived the war and the remaining ones were used in Romania until the 1950s.

=== Other countries ===
A single aircraft was used in Estonia. Two RWD 13, sent to the World's Fair, were sold after the outbreak of war in 1939 and used in the United States (N20651 and N20652), where their structure was modified by Lt. Joseph Malejki. Three (or one) aircraft were sold to Yemen. Several RWD 13 were evacuated to Latvia and they were probably later seized by the Soviets.

== Operators ==
=== Military operators ===
Brazil

- Brazilian Air Force

Estonia

- Estonian Air Force operated one RWD 13S evacuated in September 1939 to Estonia.

Croatia

- Air Force of the Independent State of Croatia 1 ex-Royal Yugoslav Air Force.

Israel

- Sherut Avir

Germany

- Luftwaffe operated captured aircraft.

Poland

- Polish Air Force

Romania

- Royal Romanian Air Force
  - Escadrila Albă
- Transnistrian air section

Sweden

- Swedish Air Force operated single RWD 13 (under the designation Tp 11) evacuated to Sweden in September 1939

Spanish State

- Spanish Air Force

Yugoslavia

- Yugoslav Royal Air Force operated Yugoslavian-made two RWD 13s, and two RWD 13S.

=== Civil operators ===
Estonia
Iran

- In May 1939, a single RWD 13 (SP-BNY) was given by the President of Poland to the Persian heir Mohammed Reza Pahlavi as a wedding gift.

British Mandate for Palestine

- Aviron company operated 2 or 3 RWD 13s (registered as VQ-PAL and VQ-PAM) until 1948 when two aircraft were handed over to Israeli Air Force.

Poland

- Aeroklub Polski
- LOT Polish Airlines

Romania
Spanish State
Sweden

- After the war ex-Swedish Air Force aircraft was used with civilian markings SE-AOF until 1951.

United States
Kingdom of Yemen
Yugoslavia

- SU Belgrade operated 2 RWD 13 aircraft.

== Specifications ==

Data from Polish aircraft 1893-1939

General characteristics

- Crew: 1 or 2
- Capacity: 1 or 2 passengers
- Length: 7.85 m (25 ft 9 in)
- Wingspan: 11.6 m (38 ft 1 in)
- Height: 2.05 m (6 ft 9 in)
- Wing area: 16 m^{2} (170 sq ft)
- Airfoil: IAW-192 (PZL-DJ3)
- Empty weight: 530 kg (1,168 lb)
- Gross weight: 890 kg (1,962 lb)
- Max takeoff weight: 930 kg (2,050 lb)
- Fuel capacity: 140 L (37 US gal; 31 imp gal) in wing root tanks
- Powerplant: 1 × PZInż. Major 4-cylinder air-cooled inverted in-line piston engine, 89–97 kW (120–130 hp)

or similar engines such as Walter Major or de Havilland Gipsy Major I

- Propellers: 2-bladed Szomański fixed-pitch wooden propeller

Performance

- Maximum speed: 210 km/h (130 mph, 110 kn) at sea level
- Cruise speed: 180 km/h (110 mph, 97 kn)
- Landing speed: 67 km/h (42 mph; 36 kn)
- Range: 900 km (560 mi, 490 nmi)
- Service ceiling: 4,200 m (13,800 ft)
- Rate of climb: 3.8 m/s (750 ft/min)
- Time to altitude: 1,000 m (3,300 ft) in 4 minutes 20 seconds
- Wing loading: 55.6 kg/m^{2} (11.4 lb/sq ft)
- Power/mass: 0.109 kW/kg (0.066 hp/lb)

== See also ==
- RWD 8

Related development

- RWD 6
- RWD 9
- RWD 15
- RWD 20

Aircraft of comparable role, configuration, and era

- de Havilland Puss Moth
- LWS-2
- SAI KZ III

Related lists

- List of aircraft of World War II

== Bibliography ==
- Arraez Cerda, Juan (December 2001). "Les avions polonais de l'aviation nationaliste: PWS-10 et RWD-13" [Polish Aircraft of the Nationalist Air Force: The PWS-10 and RWD-13]. Avions: Toute l'Aéronautique et son histoire (in French) (105): 38–43. ISSN 1243-8650.
