= Reshumot (journal) =

Jewish folklore journal (1918-53)

Reshumot: Me'asef le-Divre Zikhronot, le-Etnografyah u-le-Foklor be Yisra'el, known simply as Reshumot, was an early journal of Jewish folklore, and the first folklore journal published in Hebrew. The journal was founded by Hayim Nahman Bialik in 1918, operating out of Odessa, and was instigated in part by the impact that the Russian Revolution and First World War had on Jewish culture in Eastern Europe. Relocating to Berlin and then (from 1926) Palestine, the journal broadened its remit to discuss ethnography (particularly that of Yemenite Jews) and musicology. Six initial volumes were released between 1918 and 1924, with a new incarnation of the journal publishing from 1945 to 1953, the latter edited by Dov Sadan. It was then replaced by Yeda-`Am, the journal of the Israeli Folklore Society.

== Bibliography ==
- Rubin, Adam (2005). "Hebrew Folklore and the Problem of Exile". Modern Judaism. 25 (1): 62–83. doi:10.1093/mj/kji001.
- Hasan-Rokem, Galit (1989). "The Study of Jewish Folklore in Israel". Jewish Folklore and Ethnology Review. 11 (1).
