= El Al Flight 402 =

1955 airliner shootdown

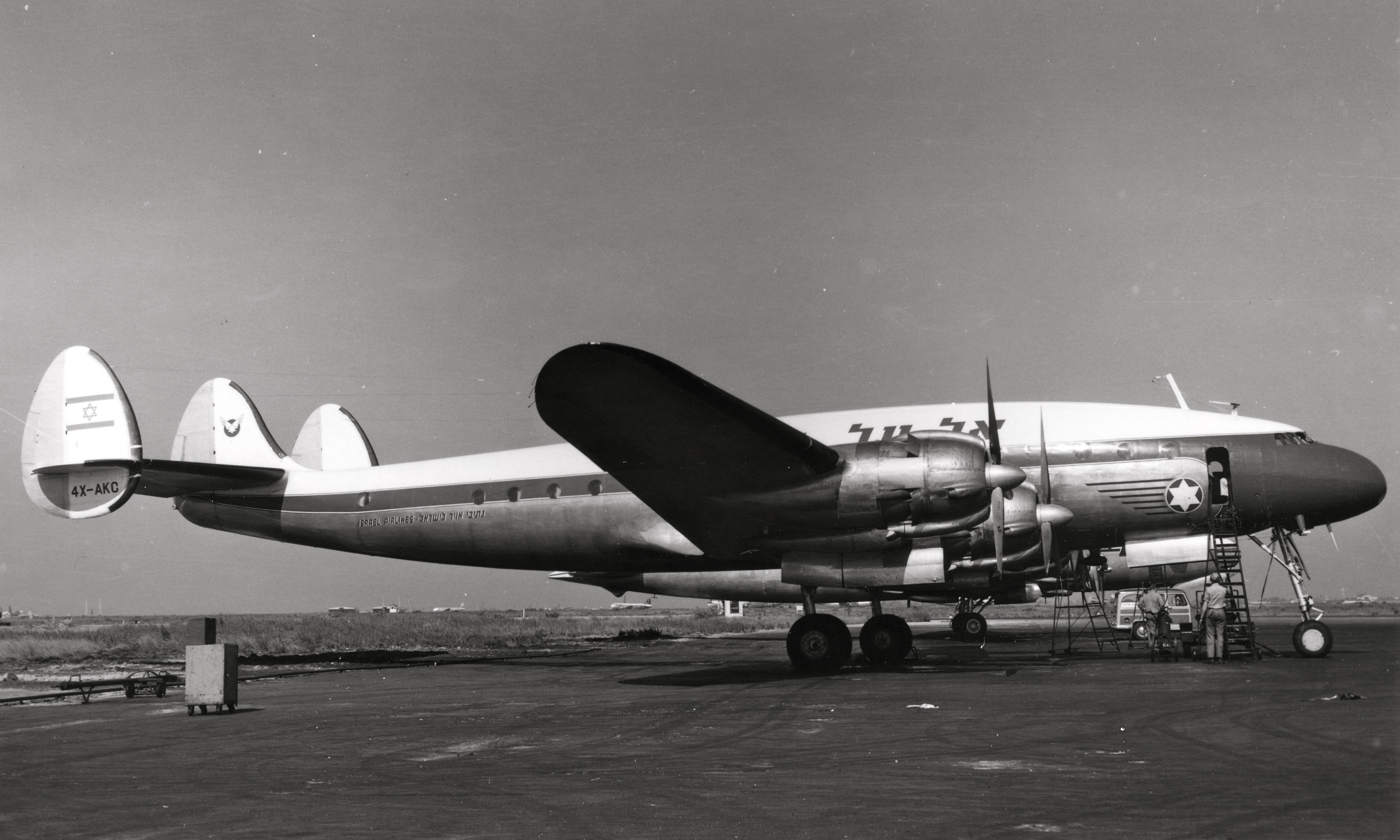
- 4X-AKC, the aircraft involved, pictured in 1950

Shootdown
- Date: July 27, 1955
- Summary: Shot down
- Site: North of Petrich, Bulgaria; 41°27′26″N 23°15′41″E

Aircraft
- Aircraft type: Lockheed L-049 Constellation
- Operator: El Al
- Registration: 4X-AKC
- Flight origin: London Heathrow Airport
- Stopover: Wien-Schwechat International Airport
- Destination: Lod Airport
- Occupants: 58
- Passengers: 51
- Crew: 7
- Fatalities: 58
- Survivors: 0

El Al Flight 402 was an international passenger flight from London to Tel Aviv via Vienna and Istanbul. On 27 July 1955, the flight, operated by a Lockheed Constellation registered as 4X-AKC, strayed into then-Communist Bulgarian airspace and was attacked by two Bulgarian MiG-15 jet fighters, crashing near Petrich. All 7 crew and 51 passengers on board the airliner were killed. The crash took place amid highly strained relations between the Eastern Bloc and the Western Bloc and was the deadliest involving the Constellation up to that time.

== Flight history ==
The Constellation originated its scheduled weekly flight from London and departed Vienna's Wien-Schwechat International Airport (VIE) at 02:53, bound to Tel Aviv's Lod Airport (since renamed to Ben Gurion Airport) via Istanbul. As the flight was to approach hostile airspace over the People's Republic of Bulgaria, the airplane was instructed to stay on the Amber 10 airway over friendly Yugoslav and Greek airspace en route to Istanbul.

== Incident ==
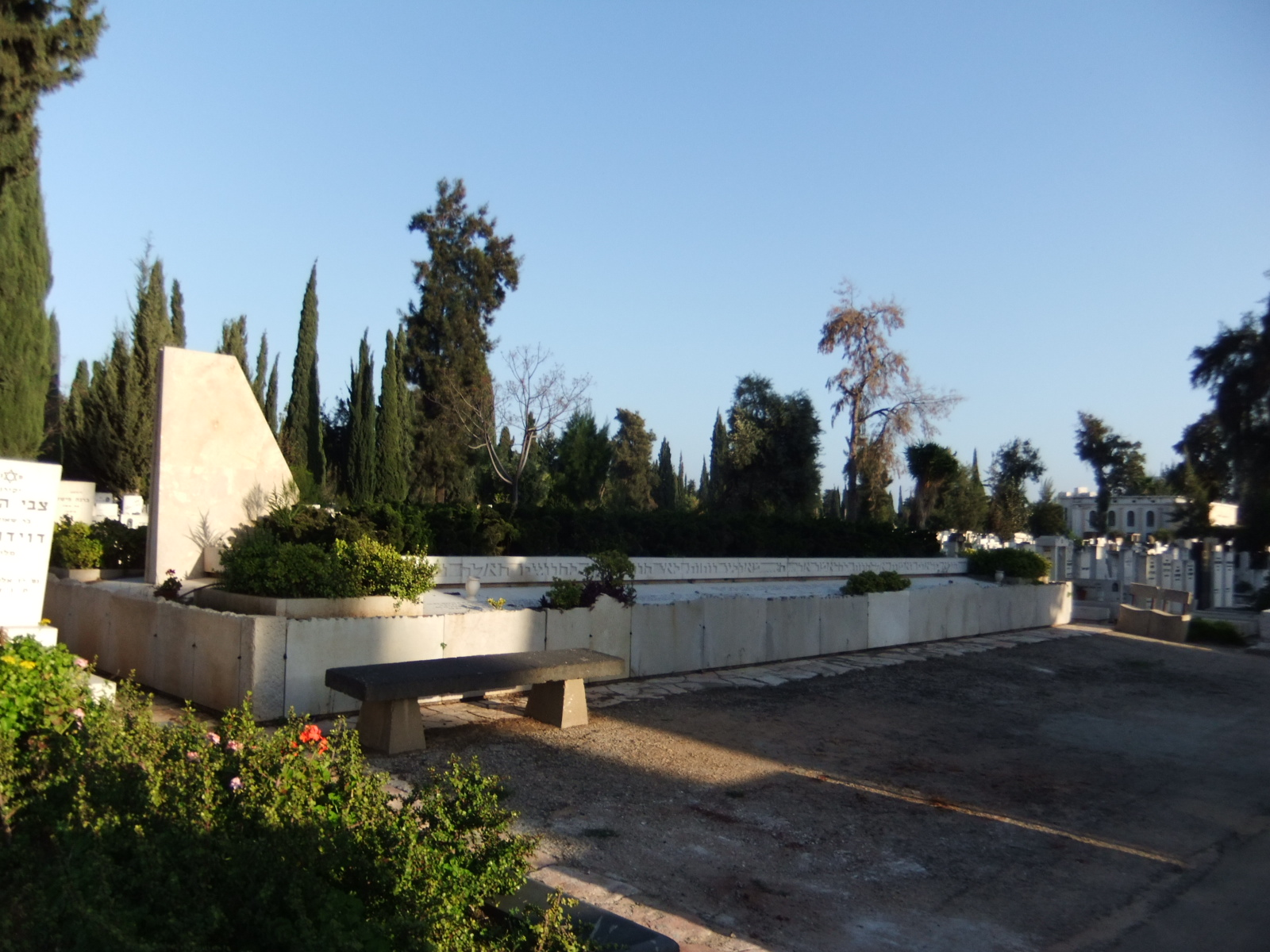
Memorial to the 58 victims at Kiryat Shaul Cemetery in Tel Aviv

The aircraft's crossing of the Western Bulgarian border was registered by an observation post of the Bulgarian military near the town of Tran. Air Defence scrambled two MiG-15 jets with pilots Petrov (pair leader) and Sankiisky by order of Deputy Commander in Chief of Air Defense, General Velitchko Georgiev. The MiGs took off from Dobroslavtsi airport and were responsible for the defense of the capital city of Sofia.

According to pilots Petrov and Sankiisky, Sankiisky first attempted to warn the El Al plane that it was in violation by shooting signal rounds in front of the Constellation's nose. Petrov then repeated the warning. The Constellation initially pretended to follow the instructions and deployed its flaps and landing gear but then sharply retracted them and changed course to Greece in a bid to escape the fighters.

The final shoot-down order was given by Georgiev who said: "If the plane is leaving our territory, disobeying orders, and there is no time left for more warnings, then shoot it down." The airliner was hit by the MiG-15's guns and then descended, breaking apart at 2,000 feet (610 m), and crashed in flames on the slopes of Kozhuh hill near the village of Rupite north-east of the town of Petrich, Bulgaria, about 7 kilometres (4 mi) from the Greek border and 25 kilometres (16 mi) from the Yugoslav border killing the 7 crew and 51 passengers.

At first, however, it was speculated that the aircraft was not brought down by fighters but by anti-aircraft guns from the ground. The next day, the Bulgarian government admitted to shooting down the airliner. It expressed regret and arranged an official inquiry but would not allow a six-man investigative team from Israel to take part. This was criticized both by the Israeli and Bulgarian sources within the investigation.

== Investigation ==
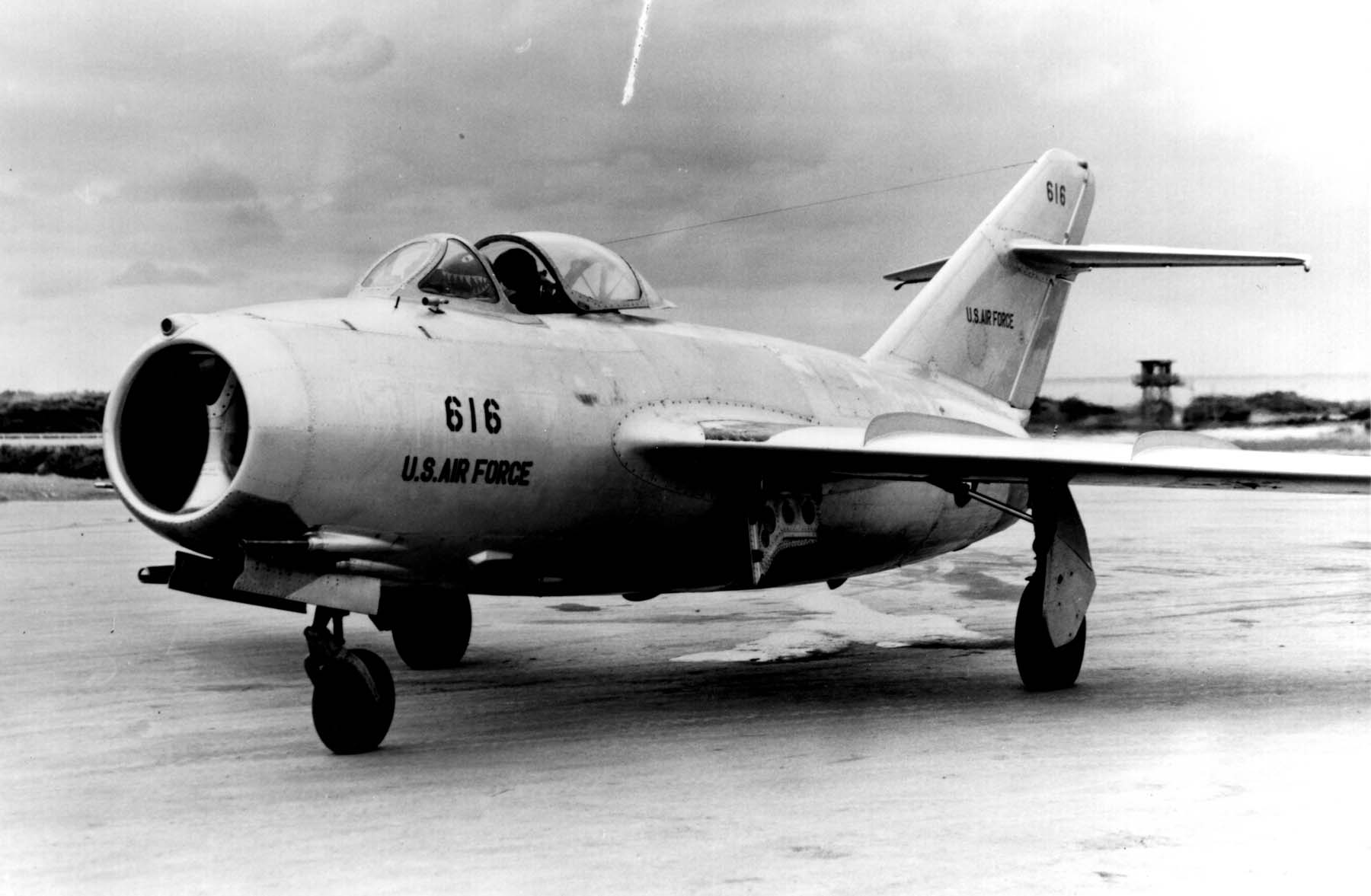
MiG-15 in USAF markings, similar to the Bulgarian jets that shot down El Al Flight 402

The accident was investigated and the following probable cause statement was issued:

The aircraft sustained a hit or hits which caused loss of pressurization and a fire in the heater compartment. The aircraft broke up in mid-air due to explosion caused by bullets hitting the right wing and probably the left wing together with a projectile or projectiles of large calibre in the rear end of the fuselage.

Why the plane veered off its intended route was never established with highly conflicting opinions from Israeli and Bulgarian investigators. One possibility is that, using NDB navigation, thunderstorm activity in the area might have upset the navigational equipment so that the crew believed they were over the Skopje radio beacon and turned to an outbound course of 142 degrees, but this version is not supported by any factual evidence of thunderstorms in the area and is disputed by both the Bulgarian military and current historiographers of Bulgarian aviation. It is firmly established only that the El Al flight, flying at FL180 (an altitude of approximately 18,000 feet (5,500 m) above mean sea level), strayed off the Amber 10 airway over Yugoslav airspace into Bulgarian territory. Bypassing the town of Tran, the El Al plane traveled a total of 200 km (120 mi) over Bulgarian territory at a 120 km (75 mi) distance from the Yugoslav-Bulgarian border before being shot down.

As a follow-up/safety action, it was recommended that more VOR stations be used on airway Amber 10 instead of just one at the time of the accident.

== Postal history ==
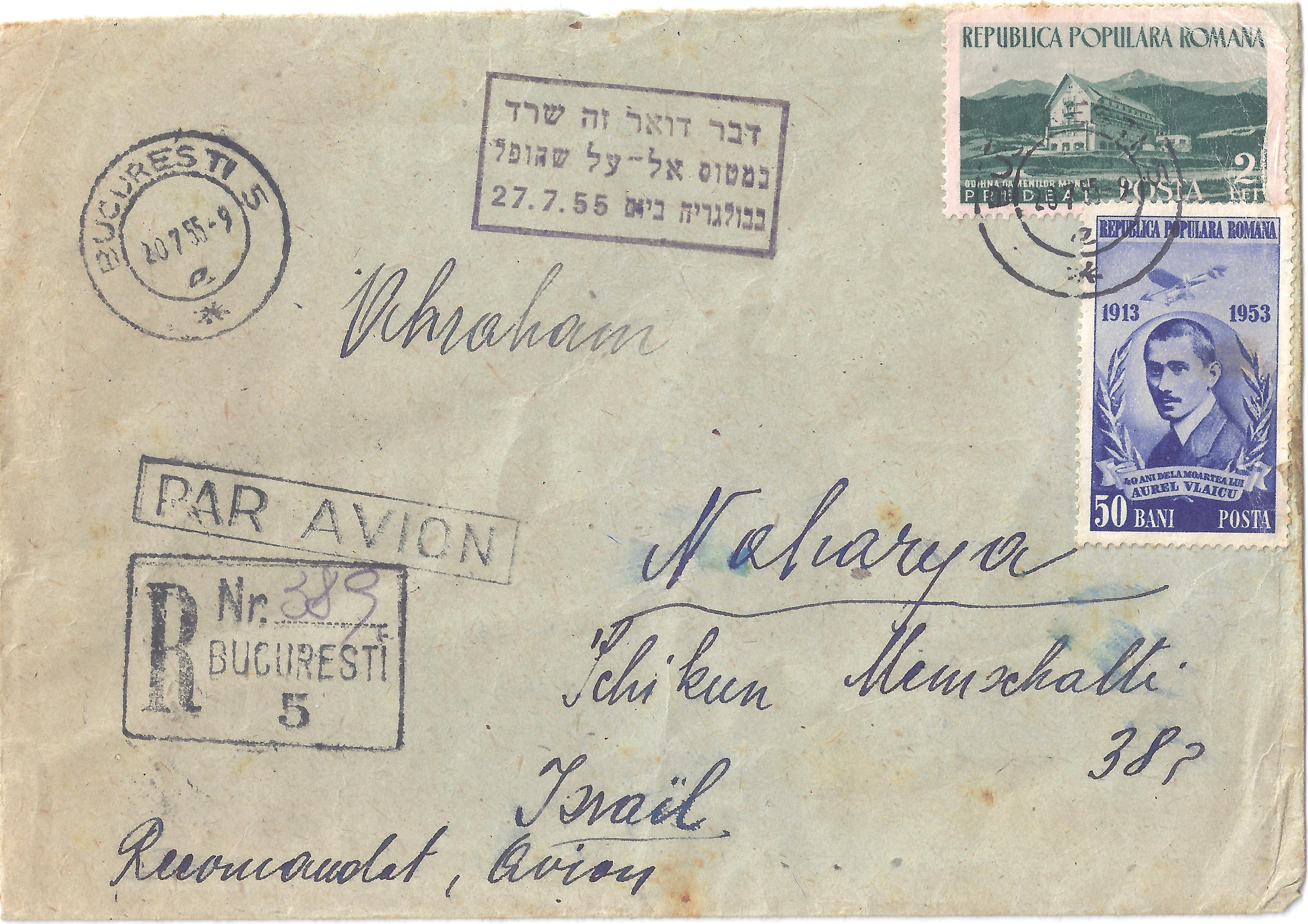
Crash cover from El Al Flight 402

Mail carried on this flight is known to have originated in Germany, the Netherlands, Romania and the USSR. A small amount of the mail was salvaged from the crash. As noted in Kibble, when the surviving mail arrived into Tel Aviv, it was stamped with a Hebrew instructional marking prior to being forwarded on to its final town destination within Israel. The boxed violet instructional marking reads (translated from the Hebrew):

This piece of mail survived in El-Al airplane that was shot down over Bulgaria on 27.7.55.

The Hebrew text is 2–3 mm (0.079–0.118 in) in size while the outline of the boxed instructional marking is 19 mm × 36 mm (0.75 in × 1.42 in) in size.

== Aftermath ==
The incident took place during the Cold War with each side interpreting the other's actions as serious provocation. The Bulgarian Communist government saw the accident as eroding the détente in East/West relations that had been achieved in talks in Geneva earlier the same year. Both pilots were considered for demotion and threatened with prison terms by Minister of the Interior Georgi Tzankov but the pilots were determined to have been following orders.

Although the Bulgarian government at first refused to accept responsibility, blaming the Israeli airliner for penetrating its airspace without authorization, it eventually issued a formal apology stating that the fighter pilots had been "too hasty" in shooting down the airliner and agreed to pay compensation to the victims' families.

== See also ==
- Korean Air Lines Flight 007
- Korean Air Lines Flight 902
- Iran Air Flight 655
- Malaysian Airlines Flight 17
- Ukraine International Airlines Flight 752
- List of accidents and incidents involving commercial aircraft
- List of airliner shootdown incidents
- Nir Hen, an Israeli moshav named to commemorate the victims
- Pinchas Ben-Porat – noted Israeli aviator, co-pilot of Flight 402
