= Eliyahu Golomb =

Founder and commander of the Haganah (1893–1945)

- אליהו גולומב
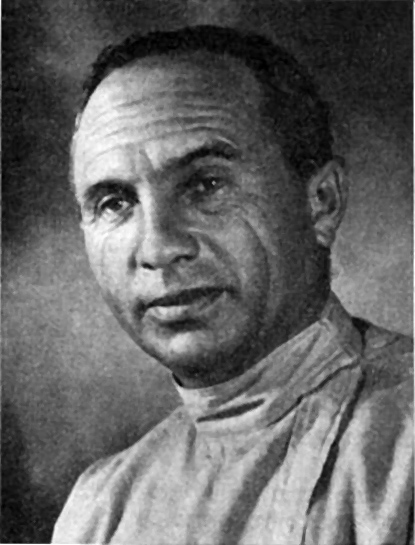
- Golomb likely in the 1940s
- Born: Eliyahu Ben-Naftali Golomb; 2 March 1893; Vawkavysk, Grodno Governorate, Russian Empire (now Belarus)
- Died: 11 June 1945 (aged 52); Tel Aviv, Mandatory Palestine
- Resting place: Trumpeldor Cemetery; 32.0706°N 34.7792°E
- Citizenship: Russian Empire (birth), Ottoman Empire (immigration), Mandatory Palestine
- Occupations: Founder of the Haganah, political activist
- Years active: 1920–1945
- Organization(s): Haganah, Ahdut HaAvoda, Histadrut
- Known for: Founder of the Haganah
- Relatives: Moshe Sharett (brother-in-law), Dov Hoz (brother-in-law)
- Awards: Israel Security Award (posthumously named in his honor)

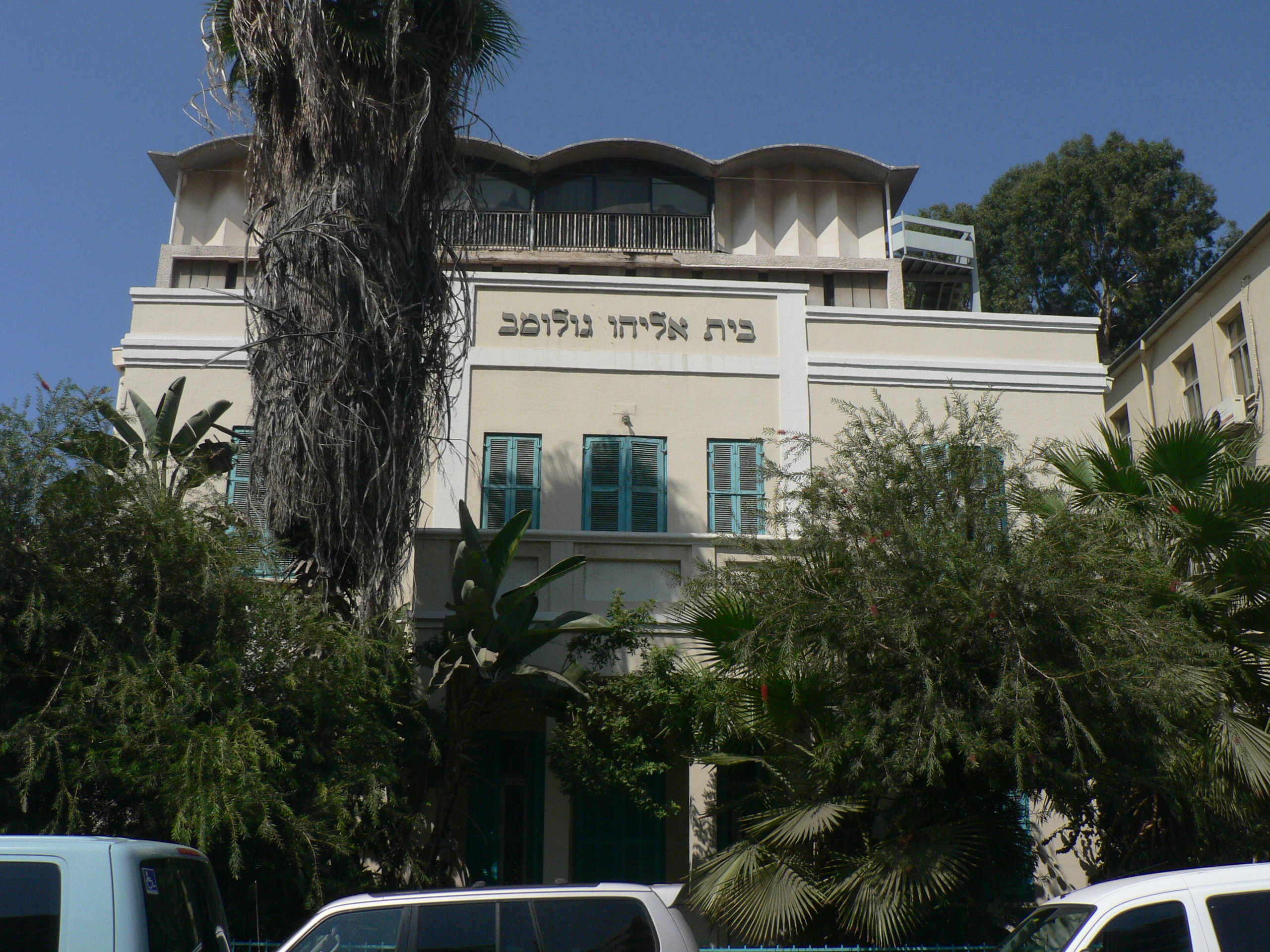
House of Eliyahu Golomb on Rotschild Boulevard 23, Tel Aviv, Israel

Eliyahu Golomb (Hebrew: אליהו גולומב; 2 March 1893 – 11 June 1945), also referred to as Eliyahu Ben-Naftali, was the "unofficial founder" of the Haganah, and one of the architects of the Jewish defense organizations in Palestine during the British Mandate. He was a member of the Haganah's Central Committee from 1920 to 1930 and a member of the National Headquarters from 1931 until 1945. He was also one of the founders of the Ahdut HaAvoda party and the Histadrut (General Federation of Labor).

== Biography ==
=== Early life ===
Eliyahu Golomb was born on 2 March 1893 to Naftali and Esther née Kellar in the shtetl of Volkovysk in the Grodno Governorate, within the Pale of Settlement of the Russian Empire (now in western Belarus). During his childhood, he studied at a "cheder" and a Russian gymnasium, where he was exposed to revolutionaries and Russian literature. In 1909, his parents sent him to Palestine to study at the Herzliya Gymnasium. Golomb graduated from the gymnasium's first class in 1913, which included Moshe Sharett (Sharettok) and Dov Hoz, who later became his brothers-in-law (the "Four Brothers-in-law" group).

His parents immigrated in 1911 and settled in Tel Aviv. His father, who owned a flour mill in Russia, established another mill in Jaffa.

After graduation, Golomb and his classmates organized the "Compact Organization of Gymnasium Graduates", the first pioneering training nucleus of working youth in Palestine. This group worked in Degania Alef and Kinneret. In November of that year, two members of Golomb's group were murdered: Moshe Barsky and a week later Yosef Zaltsman (a member of the Kinneret Group). These events shocked the group. According to Ahuvia Malchin in his book "The Activist," "the severe incidents and the tension that followed left a deep impression on the gymnasium students, affecting their entire lives." Following these events, Golomb concluded that "without the ability to defend, agricultural work and settlement are not enough; only the combination of labor and defense can lead to a genuine hold on the land."

In 1914, Golomb’s father died, forcing him to return to Tel Aviv to manage the flour mill. He was ordered by Hassan Bey, the Ottoman military governor of Jaffa, to continue grinding flour even on Shabbat. Initially, Golomb did not see this order as offensive, as work was done on Shabbat in urgent cases in Degania and Kinneret. However, the religious workers at the mill refused to work on Shabbat, and Golomb realized that their refusal had national significance. He decided to defend the Jews' right to observe their commandments. Consequently, Hassan Bey punished him with "falakas" (whipping). This humiliation was one of the factors that led Golomb to initiate the establishment of the Haganah. He initially decided to take revenge and obtained a pistol. Fortunately, his close friend Dov Hoz caught him cleaning the pistol and immediately understood his intention. In a long conversation, Hoz managed to convince him that personal revenge would not be beneficial, as even if Golomb managed to escape execution by hanging, Jews would pay with their lives for Hassan Bey's spilled blood, and another Turkish officer might be appointed who could be worse. Instead, the two decided to establish a nationwide defense organization for the Jewish settlement.

Golomb opposed recruitment into the Ottoman army, mainly because he, like many others, believed the Ottoman Empire was in decline. In 1917, when the British took control of Palestine from the Turks, Golomb volunteered for the Jewish Legion.

At the end of World War I, Golomb established the "Jaffa Group", which prepared for self-defense and maintained ties with the "Hashomer" organization.

=== Golomb in the Haganah ===
In June 1920, the Haganah organization was established. Golomb supported the dissolution of the Hashomer organization and was one of the main debaters with Israel Shochat and the other leaders of Hashomer.

Golomb was a founder of the Haganah and led it for many years, during which he was involved in purchasing weapons from abroad (mainly from Vienna, Paris, and Berlin). Between 1922 and 1924, Golomb was sent abroad by the Haganah to buy weapons and organize groups of young pioneers in Europe.

Golomb sought to institutionalize the Haganah under organizational authority—first under the Histadrut, and later under the National Institutions.

Golomb stood out among the Haganah leadership as a representative of the young generation raised in Palestine. The Haganah was a popular organization, "composed of anyone who could defend themselves, under the command of the public-political leadership, with the goal of protecting not only property, life, and honor but also the Zionist enterprise."

=== Political activities ===
Golomb was a founder of the Ahdut HaAvoda movement and the Histadrut. He was a member of the National Committee and a delegate of his party to the Zionist Congresses. He organized Aliyah Bet during the British Mandate period and initiated the plan for the Haganah parachutists in Europe during the Holocaust.

=== Death ===
Eliyahu Golomb died from a cerebral hemorrhage in his home in Tel Aviv on 30 Sivan (11 June 1945). He was buried at the Trumpeldor Cemetery in Tel Aviv next to his brother-in-law Dov Hoz and his family. His other brother-in-law Moshe Sharett and his wife were also buried there later.

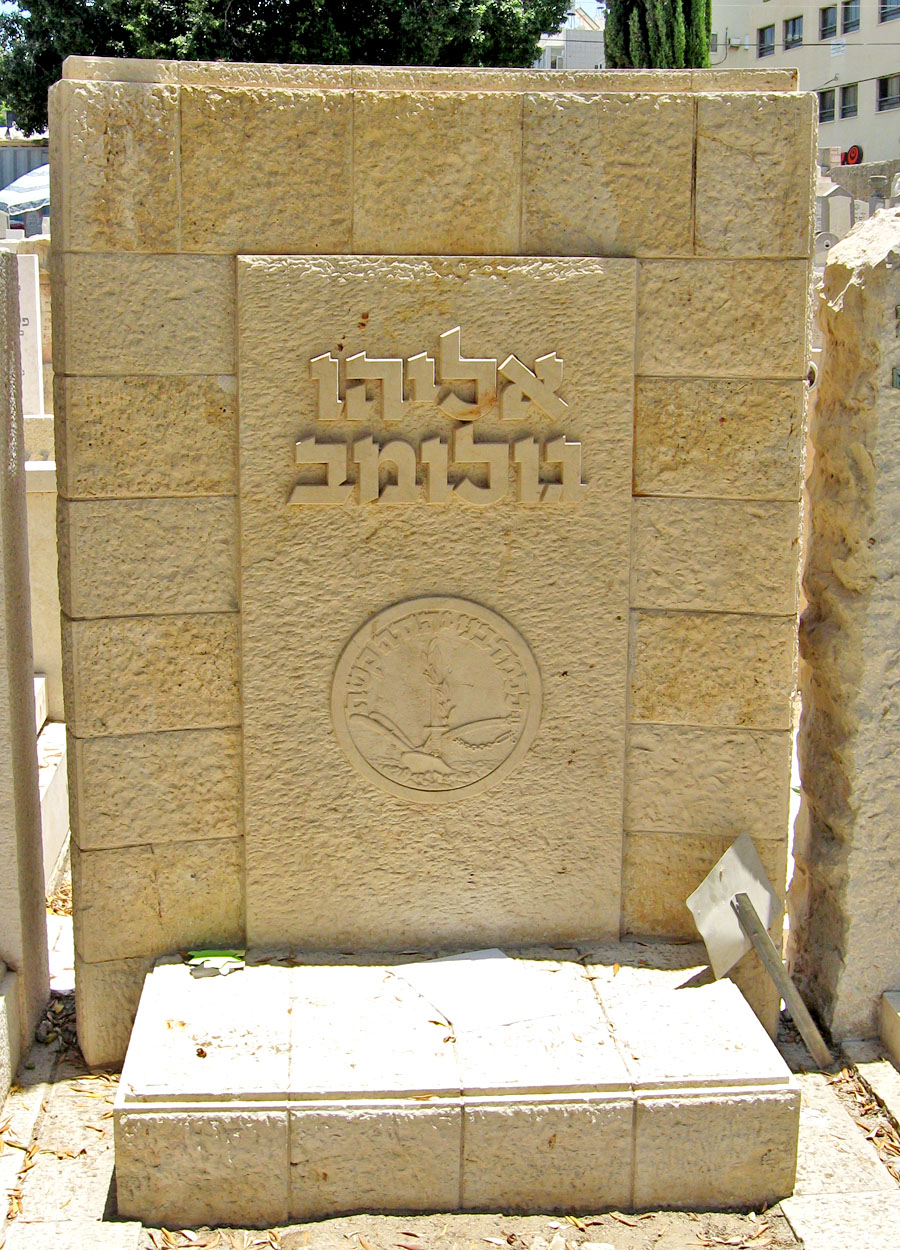
Eliyahu Golomb's grave

== Family ==
Golomb was in love with Rivka, Moshe Sharett’s sister, who was his close friend and confidante, but she married his friend Dov Hoz. Later, he married her younger sister, Ada Sharett.

Golomb and Ada had three children: Dikla, David (Dudik), and Dalia. His son David later became a Knesset member. His daughter, Dalia, was married to Asher Yadlin and is now a central activist in the Machsom Watch organization.

In addition to their biological children, Golomb and his wife raised Harry Golomb, the son of Ada's younger sister, Geula Sharett. Geula did not marry and had an affair with the father of her son, Ami Assaf, who did not acknowledge their child. She died during childbirth. Ada and Eliyahu Golomb raised Harry as their own. Harry later became a researcher of theater and an associate professor at Tel Aviv University.

== Legacy ==
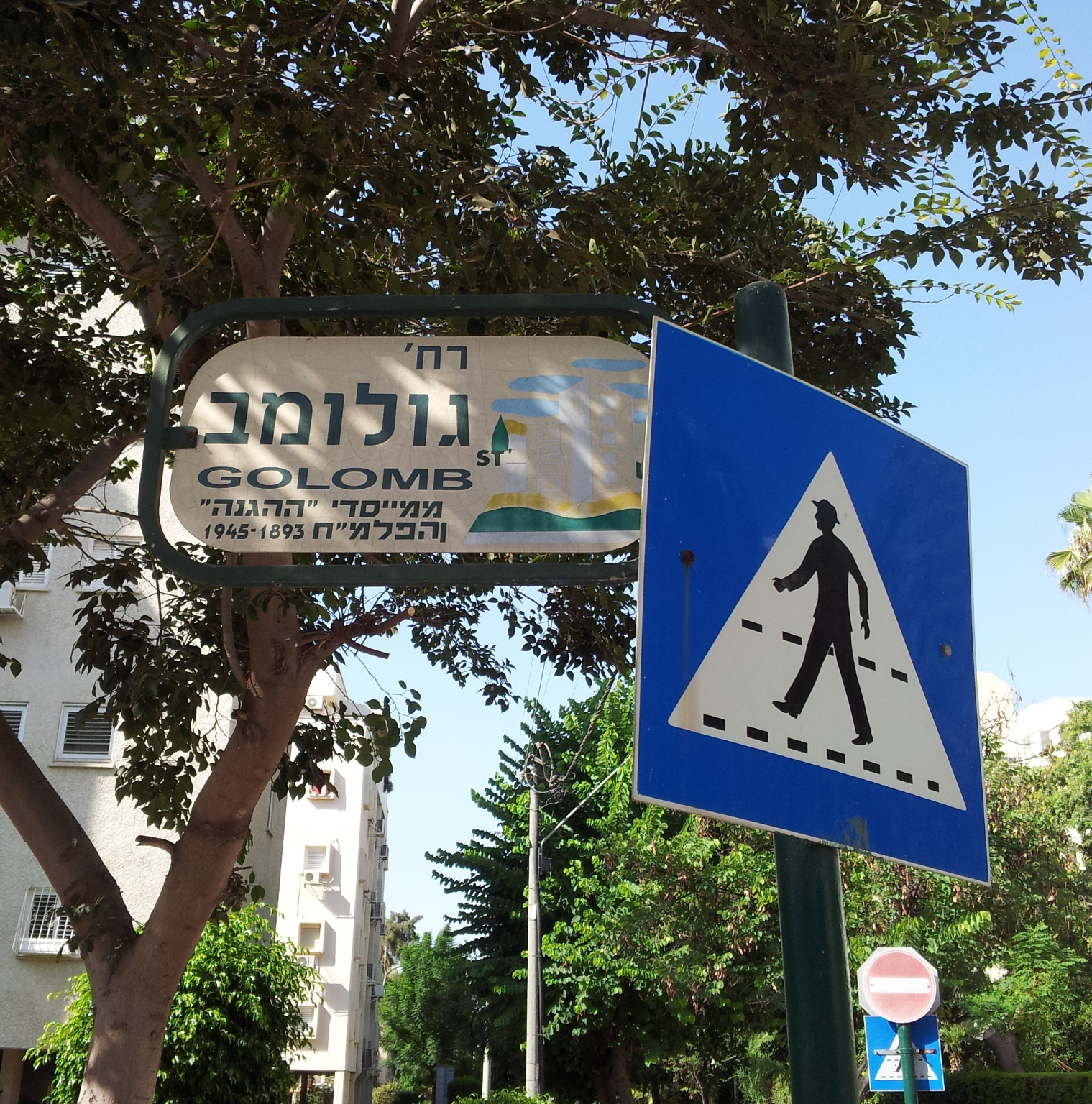
Street sign named after him in Ra'anana

- Ships named after him: "Eliyahu Golomb (Aliyah Ship)" and "Dalin" (one of his nicknames).
- Yad Eliyahu neighborhood in Tel Aviv, including the Yad Eliyahu Arena, home to the Maccabi Tel Aviv Basketball Club.
- Kibbutz Nir Eliyahu, the first Nahal kibbutz, where a cultural center named "Beit Eliyahu" was built in his honor.
- "Golomb House" – the cultural center of Kibbutz Revivim.
- Streets named after him in several Israeli cities: Jerusalem, Tel Aviv, Giv'atayim, Bnei Brak, Holon, Be'er Sheva, Kfar Saba, Herzliya, Ra'anana, and Ness Ziona.
- The Israel Security Award, presented by the President of Israel since 1958, is named after him.

His home, "Beit Eliyahu," on Rothschild Boulevard in Tel Aviv, served for many years as part of the Haganah headquarters and now houses the Haganah Museum, its archives, and the offices of the Haganah Members Organization.

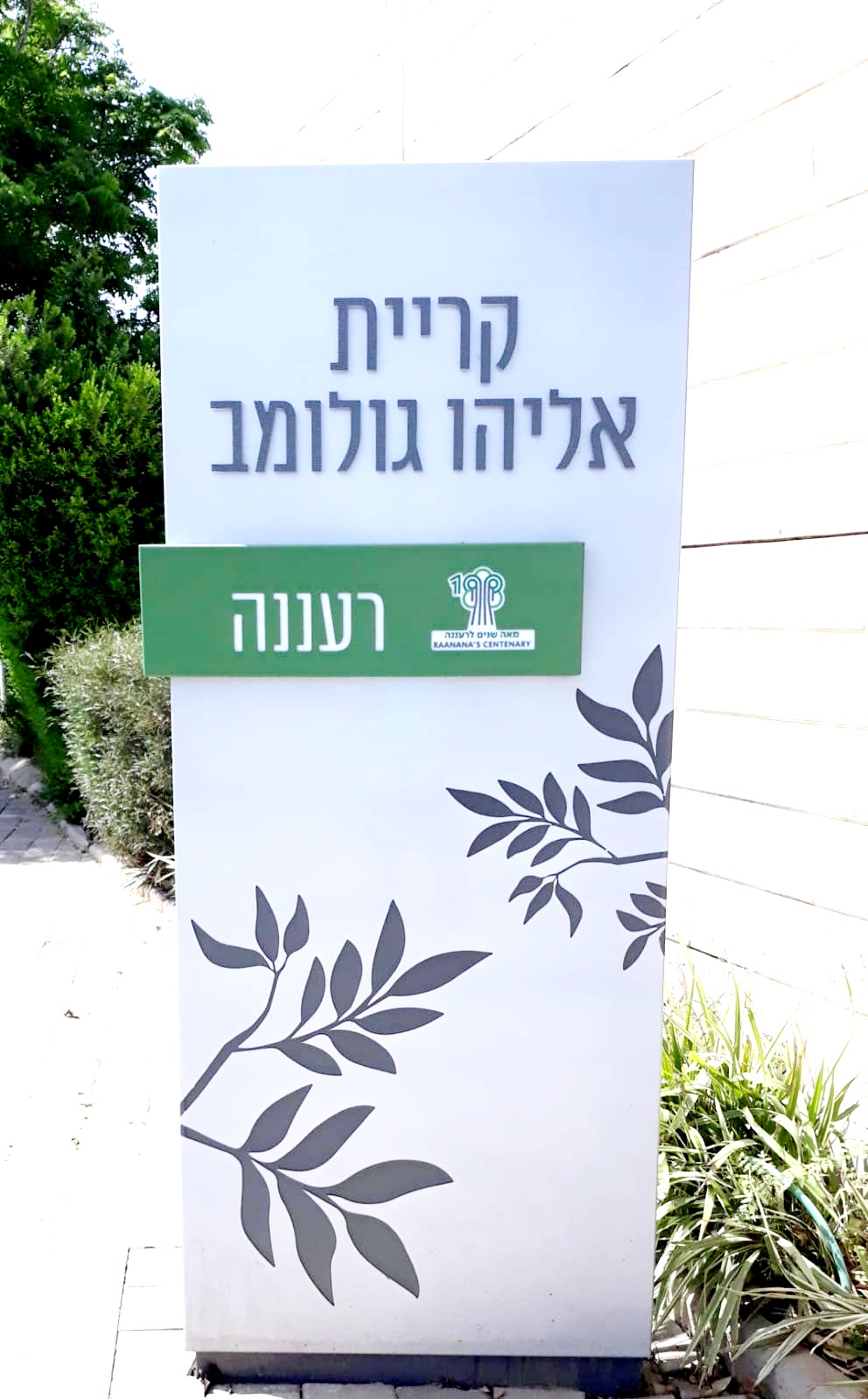
Golomb Quarter neighborhood in Ra'anana.

On 23 April 1978, the Israel Postal Service issued a series of five stamps featuring portraits of figures from Israel's modern history. One of these stamps was dedicated to Eliyahu Golomb's memory, with the inscription: "30 years of Israel's Independence." The stamp was designed by Zvi Narkis, and the Postal Service sold 1,206,000 units of this stamp before it was discontinued.

== Publications ==
- Main Points in the History of the Settlement’s Defense, Haifa: Hebrew Scouts Association, 1944 (pamphlet)
- Strength in Secret (edited by Yehuda Erez), 2 vols., Tel Aviv: Mapai, 1950–1954. (Revised and expanded edition: Tel Aviv: Einot, 1953–1955)
- Eliyahu Golomb: From His Writings, Tel Aviv: Youth Guard of Mapai, 1945.
- Eliahou Golomb, Les origines de la défense juive (translation by L. Wurmbrand), Jerusalem: R. Mass, 1946.
- Eliyahu Golomb, The History of Jewish Self-Defense in Palestine (1878–1921), Tel Aviv: Lion the Printer, for the Zionist Youth Dept., [1947?]
- Eliahu Golomb, Los Origenes de la Hagana (translated from French by Ralph Seroussi), Jerusalem: Published by the Youth Department of the World Zionist Organization, 1949.
