= Palavir =

Aerial service of Haganah's Palmach force

- Active: 1943-1947
- Country: Israel
- Branch: Haganah
- Type: Air force
- Role: Aerial reconnaissance Aerial warfare Close air support
- Size: 8 pilots

Commanders
- Notable commanders: Pinchas Ben-Porat, 1944

The Palavir, an acronym for Plugat HaAvir (Hebrew: פלוגת האוויר, Air Companies) was the air force for the Palmach, based in Tel Aviv. Little is known about the Palmach's flying platoon due to its short life and its secrecy during the British Mandate. Like the rest of the Palmach it was made up entirely of Jewish fighters.

== History ==
In 1945, the Palavir was developed as Palmach's air division. The Palavir fell under the command of the unofficial Jewish defense force Haganah and operated prior to the establishment of the State of Israel. The Palmach's naval branch, Palyam, was also created in the same year. In 1943 the Palmach sent 3 of its fighters to be trained at the Jewish Agency-owned flying school, Aviron flying school, in kibbutz Afikim. Later, the Palavir sent six more fighters. However, in 1943 the British outlawed the Haganah and Palmach. In response, both organizations went underground. The Palavir disguised itself as an aeroclub called Palestine Flying Club and continued to train until 1947. The Palavir pilots also operated out of Ramla airport. In 1947, the Palavir and aeroclub were reorganized into the Sherut Avir which benefited from the return of Jewish soldiers who had been fighting in the Jewish Brigade of the British Army. In 1948 the Sherut Avir became the Heil HaAvir or Israeli Air Force. Also with the independence in 1948 the Palestine Flying Club was renamed the Israel Aero Club.

== Contribution ==
The 'Palavir' acquired its first aircraft, the de Havilland D.H.82C Tiger Moth in 1936 when the Yishuv leader, David Ben-Gurion, managed to purchase one from Britain. The plane's purchase was difficult due to resistance by the British government which feared that an independent Jewish force might encourage a similar Arab force. It was flown in by a British flight instructor named Grey and registered under the marks G-ACYN, with serial number 3314. Later, in 1947, two Tiger Moths from Canada were acquired as donations to a Jewish aeroclub. The same year, Aviron flying school moved out of Afikim and Ramla to Lod Airport. For the remainder of Palavir's existence, it began to operate out of Haifa further north, enabling the Tiger Moths to photograph Syrian army camps in the Golan. The fact that the Palavir was created together with the Palmach and Palyam meant that it was born from the same soldiers and structure. Palmachniks would often interchange leadership positions between these branches. This culture continues in the IDF today, where the military's branches contrast the strict cultural divides that many militaries have developed (i.e. between the Navy and the Army). In Israel the IAF and the rest of the IDF are very much intertwined in history, culture, and operation.

== Known pilots ==
- Pinchas Ben-Porat
