= Dov Sadan =

Israeli literary critic and politician (1902–1989)

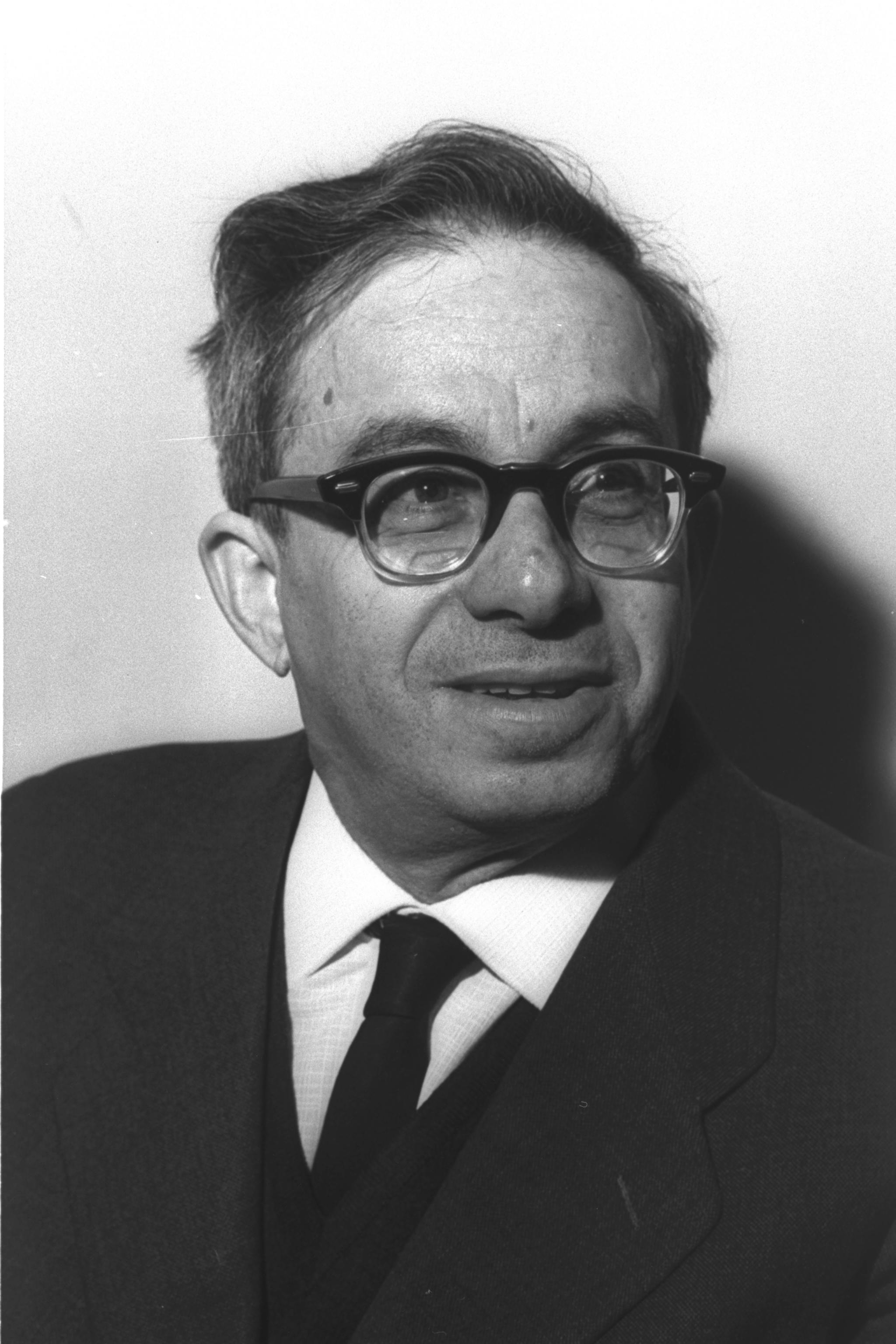
- Sadan in 1966

Faction represented in the Knesset
- 1965–1968: Alignment

Personal details
- Born: 21 February 1902 Brody, Austria-Hungary
- Died: 14 October 1989 (aged 87)

Dov Sadan (Hebrew: דב סדן; 21 February 1902 – 14 October 1989) was an Israeli literary critic and politician who served as a member of the Knesset for the Alignment between 1965 and 1968.

== Biography ==
Born Dov Berl Stock in Brody in the Galicia region of Austria-Hungary (today in Ukraine), Sadan received a traditional Jewish education. He joined HeHalutz, and was one of its leaders during World War I. In 1925 he became editor of Atid, the organisation's journal.

After making aliyah to Mandatory Palestine in 1925, he initially worked as an agricultural laborer, before joining the staff of the daily newspaper Davar in 1927. In 1928 he traveled to Germany as an emissary for HeHalutz. Upon his return, he worked as a teacher in Lower Galilee and in Jerusalem. In 1933 Sadan returned to work at Davar; he also edited the paper's literary supplement. After leaving Davar again in 1944 he became a member of the editorial board at the Am Oved publishing house.

In 1952 he was appointed head of Yiddish Studies faculty at the Hebrew University of Jerusalem, a post he held until 1970, and in 1963 became a professor. In 1965 he was elected to the Knesset on the Alignment list, and became a member of the Education and Culture Committee. However, he resigned his seat in 1968, and was replaced by David Golomb. Also in 1965 he began teaching Hebrew literature at Tel Aviv University, where he worked until 1970. He was also a member of the Academy of Sciences and Humanities.

In 1968 Sadan was awarded the Israel Prize for Jewish studies. In 1980 he was awarded the Bialik Prize for literature; He also received a number of other prizes, including the Brenner Prize.

He died in 1989 at the age of 87.

== See also ==
- List of Israel Prize recipients
