= Aviron Aviation Company =

Aviron Palestine Aviation Company was established in April 1936 in Mandatory Palestine. The company was intended to train pilots and then operate a mainly internal airline, which would serve the security needs of the Yishuv, the Jewish community in Palestine.

== Name ==
Aviron is the word for airplane invented in 1908 either by Eliezer Ben-Yehuda or by his son Itamar Ben-Avi, the first native speaker of Modern Hebrew. In the second half of 20th century, it fell out of use in favour of matos, invented in 1928 by Hayim Nahman Bialik.

== History ==
The Aviron airline company was established in 1936 by Dov Hoz and Yitzhak Ben Ya'akov, one of the first members of Degania, at the initiative of the Histadrut trade union association and the Jewish Agency. At its beginnings, Aviron was based in three kibbutzim in the northern Jordan Valley, with the flight school in the attic of the cowshed at Degania Alef, an improvised airstrip at Afikim, and a hangar at Ashdot Ya'akov. In 1938, Aviron opened a flight school and held its first graduation ceremony of fifteen Jewish pilots on 21 April 1939.

Two years previously, in 1934, Zionist officials who dealt with Jewish immigration from Poland obtained from David Ben-Gurion, who acted on behalf of the Jewish Agency, the money for buying a de Havilland Tiger Moth. The airplane arrived in October that year, flown by a British instructor-pilot.

During the 1936–1939 Arab revolt in Palestine, Aviron assisted the Haganah in reconnaissance missions and the transfer of supplies and medical aid to otherwise inaccessible settlements.

Besides two teaching planes, the company operated two aircraft with three passenger seats and two with two passenger seats, offering a daily service between Lydda, Haifa and Tiberias.

== Gallery ==
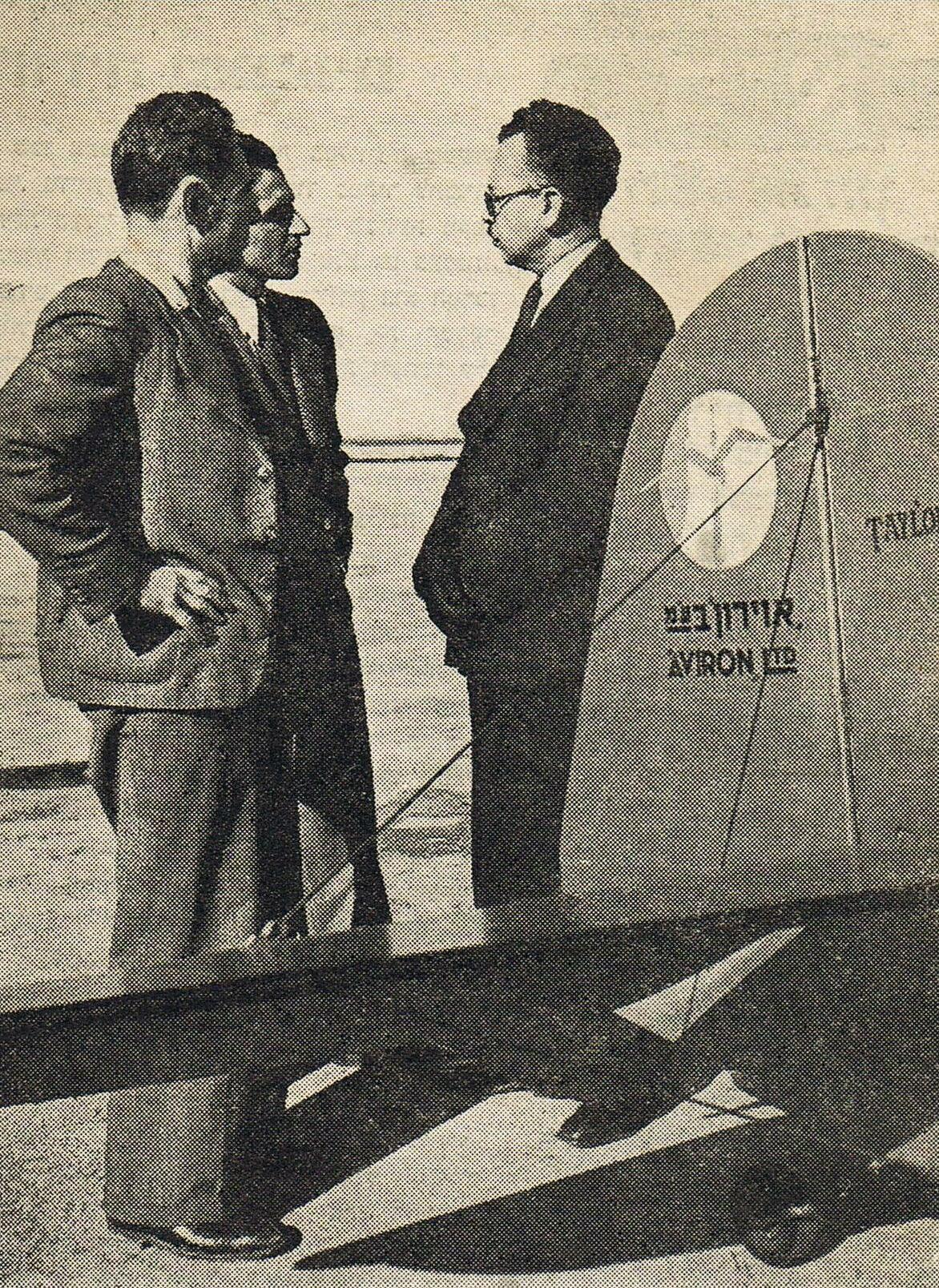

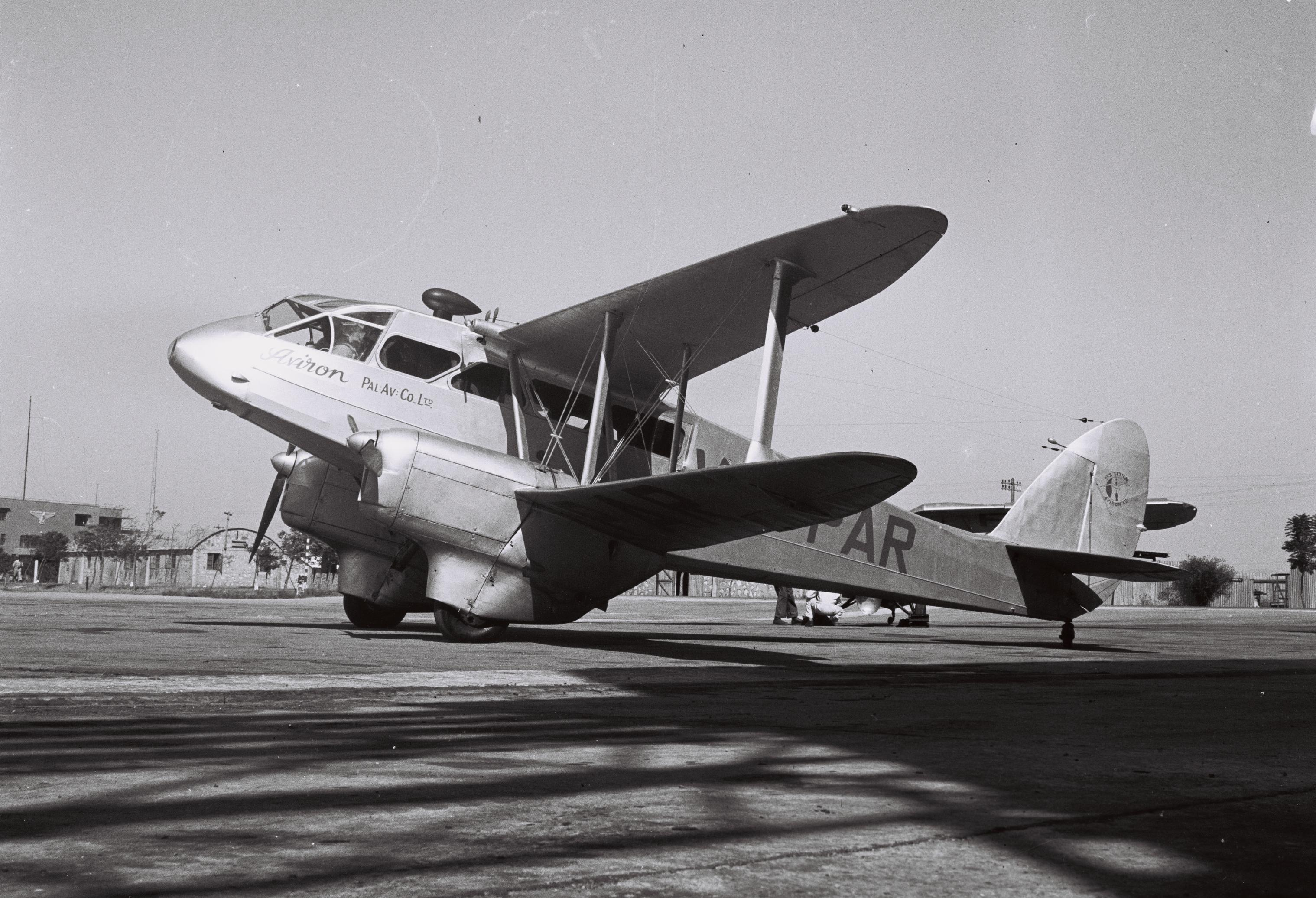
1947 in the British Mandate of Palestine

== See also ==
- Palavir, the air branch of the Palmach
- Sherut Avir, the air branch of the Haganah, which took over Aviron's materiel in 1947-48
- Israeli Air Force
