= Sherut Avir =

Haganah aerial unit and forerunner of the Israeli Air Force

- שרות אויר
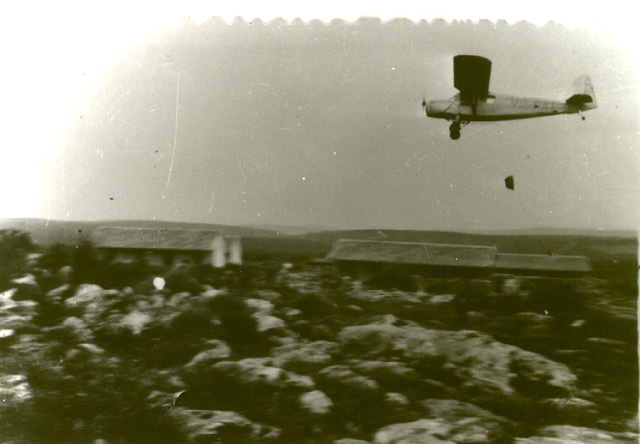
- Sherut Avir RWD-13 dropping supplies at Yehiam, January 1948
- Active: 10 November 1947 – May 1948
- Country: Mandatory Palestine
- Allegiance: Haganah
- Branch: Air service
- Role: Military aviation
- Garrison/HQ: Tel Aviv
- Engagements: 1947–1949 Palestine war

Aircraft flown
- Attack: Avia S-199 (acquired later as part of the transition to the Israeli Air Force)
- Patrol: Fairchild 24; Auster Autocrat
- Reconnaissance: Piper J-3 Cub
- Transport: RWD-13; de Havilland Dragon Rapide; Piper Cub

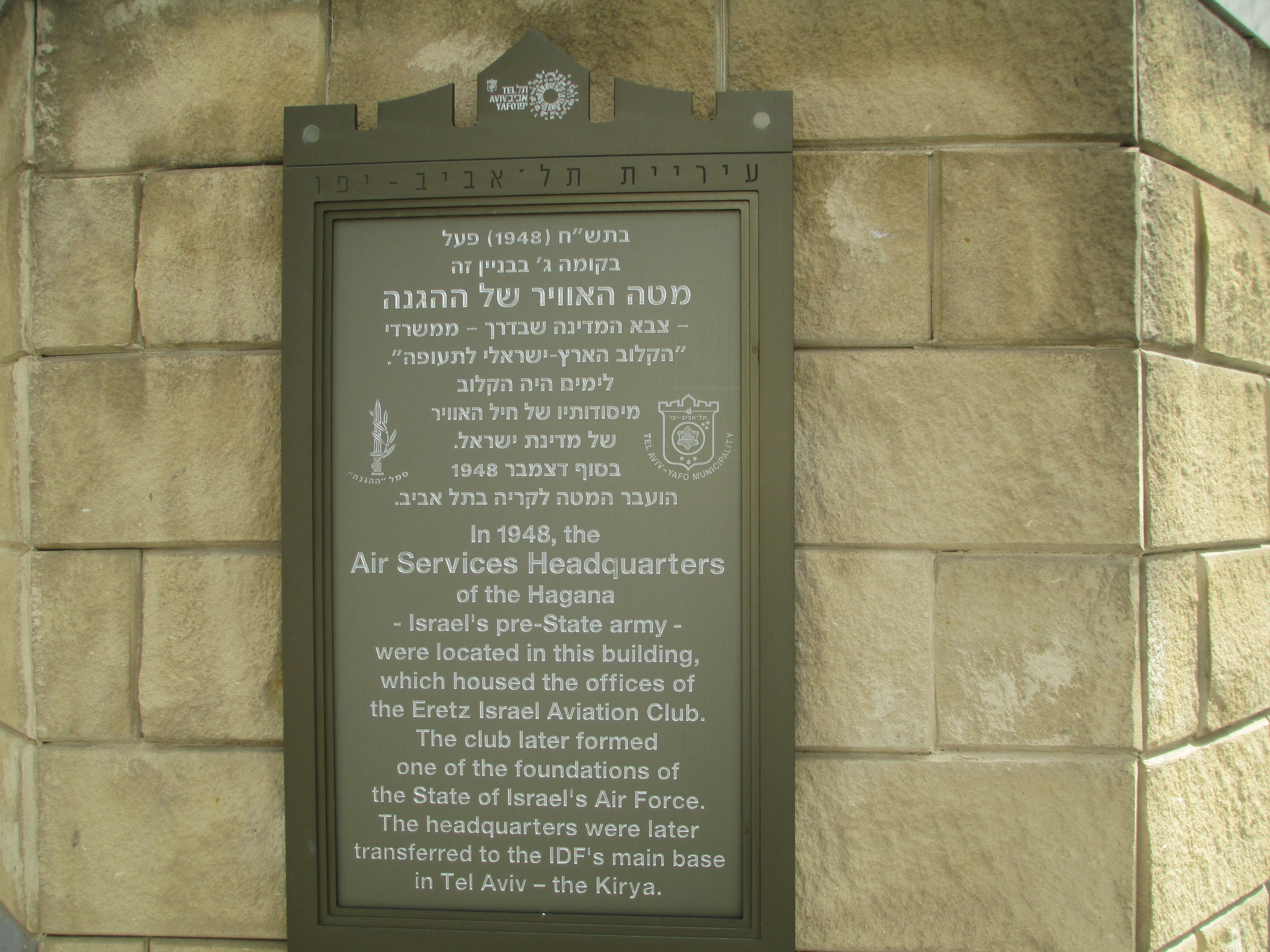
Memorial plaque of the Hagana air service headquarters

The Sherut Avir (Hebrew: שרות אויר, Air Service) was the air force of the Haganah and the forerunner of the Israeli Air Force.

== Founding ==
The Sherut Avir was founded on 10 November 1947, just two weeks prior to the passing of the 1947 UN Partition Plan on 29 November which proposed the division of Palestine into a Jewish state and an Arab state. It was at this time that Haganah leaders brought the Palmach's air branch, the Palavir out of hiding, recognizing the need for an air arm if a Jewish State was established. However, the Sherut Avir would have to be built from scratch. Because of this, its initial strength in comparison with some neighboring air forces, especially Egypt, was quite insignificant. By the time of Israel's declaration of statehood in May 1948, the Sherut Avir had only 25 aircraft. Most of them had come from Aviron, the first Jewish airline in Palestine established in 1936. While Aviron itself was not part of the Haganah, they had worked closely together in liaison, reconnaissance, and medical missions. Between late-1947 and mid-1948, as tensions mounted before the 1948 Arab-Israeli War, Aviron transferred all of its aircraft to the fledgling air force. The second problem faced by the Sherut Avir was a lack of trained airmen and ground crew. Only a handful of mechanics, engineers, pilots, former-RAF servicemen, and Histadrut personnel filled the initial ranks.

== Operations ==
The Sherut Avir set up headquarters on Tel Aviv's Montefiore Street and began its air operations just outside at Sde Dov Airport. Its first combat came quickly; just before Christmas, on December 17, 1947, pilot Pinchas Ben-Porat boarded his single-engine RWD-13 to ferry a medical doctor to the small town of Beit Eshel. Once he completed that leg of the mission, Ben-Porat was supposed to fly to Nevatim, but learning that 200 Arabs were assaulting it, he removed the doors of his aircraft to install a Bren Gun, and with a volunteer gunner and some hand grenades, took off for the village.

== See also ==
- Aviron flying school, prepared civilian and military pilots in the 1930s and 40s
- Galilee Squadron, Sherut Avir unit during the 1948 Arab-Israeli War
