= Haganah =

Zionist paramilitary organization (1920–1948)

The Defense
- הַהֲגָנָה
- Founded: 1920; 106 years ago
- Dates active: 1920–1948
- Dissolved: 28 May 1948; 78 years ago
- Merged into: Israel Defense Forces
- Country: Israel (14–28 May 1948)
- Allegiance: Yishuv (1920–1948); Jewish Agency for Israel
- Ideology: Zionism; Majority: Socialism; Labor Zionism
- Political position: Big tent Majority: Centre-left to left-wing
- Status: Paramilitary
- Size: 21,000 (average)

The Haganah (Hebrew: הַהֲגָנָה, romanized: ha-Haganah, lit. 'The Defense') (Note: Also spelled Hagana) was the main Zionist paramilitary organization that operated for the Yishuv in the British Mandate for Palestine. It was founded in 1920 to defend the Yishuv's presence in the region, and was formally disbanded in 1948, when it became the core force integrated into the Israel Defense Forces shortly after the Israeli Declaration of Independence.

Formed out of previous existing militias, the Haganah's original purpose was to defend Jewish settlements against Arab attacks; this was the case during the 1921 Jaffa riots, the 1929 Palestine riots, the 1936 Jaffa riots, and the 1936–1939 Arab revolt in Palestine, among others. The paramilitary was under the control of the Jewish Agency, the official governmental body in charge of Palestine's Jewish community during the British era. Until the end of World War II, the Haganah's activities were moderate, in accordance with the strategic policy of havlagah (lit. 'self-restraint'), which caused the breakaway of the more radical paramilitaries: Irgun and Lehi. The Haganah received clandestine military support from Poland and sought cooperation with the United Kingdom in the event of an Axis-led invasion of Palestine through North Africa, prompting the creation of the Palmach, their elite fighting force, in 1941.

Following the end of World War II, the British refused to lift the restrictions on Jewish immigration that they had imposed with the 1939 White Paper. This resulted in the Haganah leading a Jewish insurgency against the British authorities in Palestine; the campaign included the paramilitaries' bombing of bridges and railways, and the sabotage of ships used to deport illegal Jewish immigrants, as well as assisting in bringing more diaspora Jews to Palestine in defiance of British policies. After the adoption of the United Nations Partition Plan for Palestine in 1947, the Haganah came into the open as the biggest fighting force among the Palestinian Jews, successfully overcoming Arab militias during the Palestinian civil war. After the Declaration of Independence of the State of Israel, the Haganah became the new nation's military force. Shortly after Israeli independence and the beginning of the 1948 Arab–Israeli War, the Haganah was merged with other paramilitary groups and reorganized into the Israel Defense Forces (IDF).

== History ==
=== Overview ===
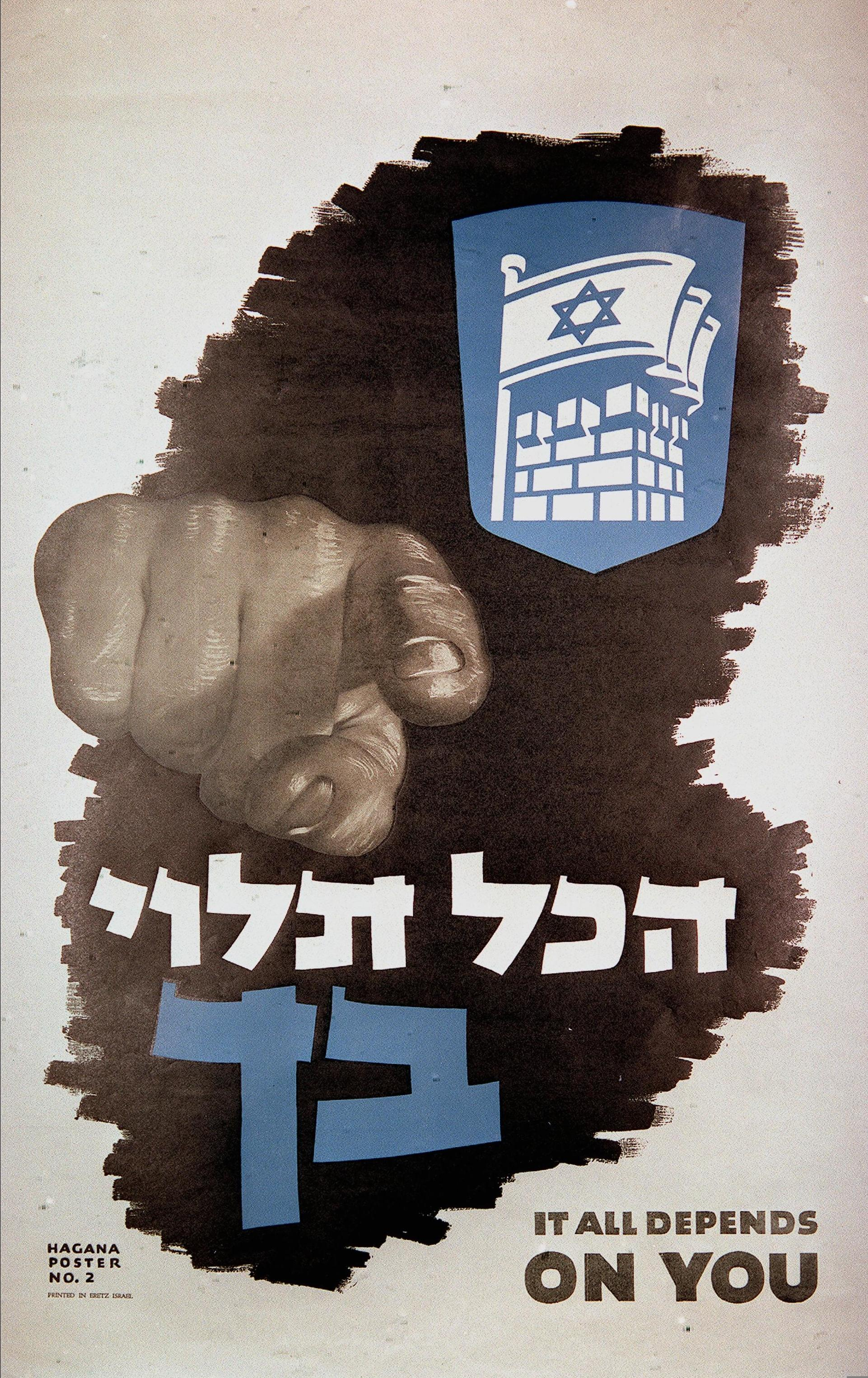
Haganah poster from the 1940s

The evolution of Jewish defense organizations in Palestine and later Israel went from small self-defense groups active during Ottoman rule, to ever-larger and more sophisticated ones during the British Mandate, leading through the Haganah to the national army of Israel, the IDF. The evolution went step by step from Bar-Giora, to Hashomer, to the Haganah, to the IDF.

The Jewish paramilitary organizations in the New Yishuv (the Zionist enterprise in Palestine) started with the Second Aliyah (1904 to 1914). The first such organization was Bar-Giora, founded in September 1907. It consisted of a small group of Jewish immigrants who guarded settlements for an annual fee. It was converted to Hashomer (Hebrew: השומר; "The Watchman") in April 1909, which operated until the British Mandate of Palestine came into being in 1920. Hashomer was an elitist organization which never had more than 100 members. During World War I, the forerunners of the Haganah/IDF were the Zion Mule Corps and the Jewish Legion, both of which were part of the British Army. After the Arab riots against Jews in April 1920, the Yishuv's leadership saw the need to create a nationwide underground defense organization, and the Haganah was founded in June of the same year. The Haganah became a full-scale defense force after the 1936–1939 Arab revolt in Palestine with an organized structure, consisting of three main units—the Field Corps, Guard Corps, and the Palmach strike force. During World War II the successor to the Jewish Legion of World War I was the Jewish Brigade, which was joined by many Haganah fighters. During the 1947–48 civil war between the Arab and Jewish communities in what was still Mandatory Palestine, a reorganized Haganah managed to defend or wrestle most of the territory it was ordered to hold or capture. At the beginning of the ensuing 1948–1949 full-scale conventional war against regular Arab armies, the Haganah was reorganized to become the core of the new Israel Defense Forces.

=== 1920 Palestine riots and 1921 Jaffa riots ===
After the 1920 Nebi Musa riots, the Jewish leadership in Palestine believed that the British, to whom the League of Nations had given a mandate over Palestine in 1920, had no desire to confront local Arab groups that frequently attacked Palestinian Jews. Believing that they could not rely on the British administration for protection from these gangs, the Jewish leadership created the Haganah to protect Jewish farms and kibbutzim. The first head of the Haganah was a 28-year-old named Yosef Hecht, a veteran of the Jewish Legion.

In addition to guarding Jewish communities, the role of the Haganah was to warn the residents of and repel attacks by Palestinians. In the period between 1920 and 1929, the Haganah lacked a strong central authority or coordination. Haganah "units" were very localized and poorly armed: they consisted mainly of Jewish farmers who took turns guarding their farms or their kibbutzim.

Following the 1929 Palestine riots, the Haganah's role changed dramatically. It became a much larger organization encompassing nearly all the youth and adults in the Jewish settlements, as well as thousands of members from the cities. It also acquired foreign arms and began to develop workshops to create grenades and simple military equipment, transforming from an untrained militia to a capable underground army.

=== 1931 Irgun split ===
Many Haganah fighters objected to the official policy of havlagah (restraint) that Jewish political leaders (who had become increasingly controlling of the Haganah) had imposed on the militia. Fighters had been instructed to only defend communities and not initiate counterattacks against Arab gangs or their communities. This policy appeared defeatist to many who believed that the best defense is a good offense. In 1931, the more militant elements of the Haganah splintered off and formed the Irgun Tsva'i-Leumi (National Military Organization), better known as "Irgun" (or by its Hebrew acronym, pronounced "Etzel").

=== 1936–1939 Arab revolt in Palestine ===
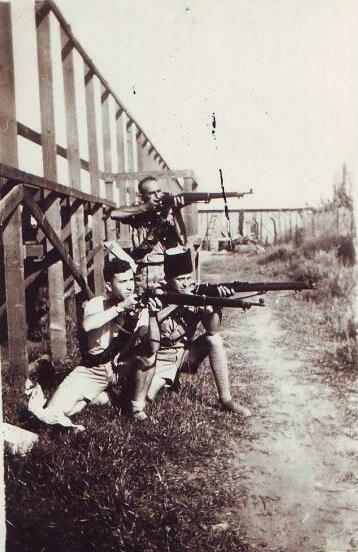
Haganah fighters guarding Migdal Tzedek, 1936

During the 1936–1939 Arab revolt in Palestine, the Haganah worked to protect British interests and to quell the rebellion using the Posh and then the Hish units. At that time, the Haganah fielded 10,000 mobilized men along with 40,000 reservists. Although the British administration did not officially recognize the Haganah, the British security forces cooperated with it by forming the Jewish Settlement Police, Jewish Supernumerary Police and Special Night Squads, which were trained and led by Colonel Orde Wingate. The battle experience gained during the training was useful in the 1948 Arab–Israeli War.

=== Support from the Second Polish Republic ===
During the interwar period, as part of its policy of supporting a Jewish state in Palestine in order to facilitate mass Jewish emigration from its territory, the Second Polish Republic provided military training and weapons to Zionist paramilitary groups, including Haganah. Envoys from Haganah headed by Yehuda Arazi received dozens of shipments with military supplies, including 2,750 Mauser rifles, 225 RKM machine guns, 10,000 hand grenades, two million cartridges for rifles and machine guns, and a large number of pistols with ammunition. The British exerted heavy pressure on the Polish government to stop these deliveries. One of the last purchases of Arazi were two airplanes and two gliders. When he fled Poland to France, around 500 rifles were abandoned in a Warsaw warehouse. Members of the Haganah were also trained in a military camp in Rembertow along with Betar members between 1931 and 1937; it is estimated that training courses at the camp were attended by around 8,000 to 10,000 participants during their existence.

=== 1939 White Paper ===
By 1939, the British had issued the White Paper, which severely restricted Jewish immigration to Palestine, deeply angering the Zionist leadership. David Ben-Gurion, then chairman of the Jewish Agency, set the policy for the Zionist relationship with the British: "We shall fight the war against Hitler as if there were no White Paper, and we shall fight the White Paper as if there were no war."

In reaction to the White Paper, the Haganah built up the Palmach as the Haganah's elite strike force and organized illegal Jewish immigration to Palestine. Approximately 100,000 Jews were brought to Palestine in over one hundred ships during the final decade of what became known as Aliyah Bet. The Haganah also organized demonstrations against British immigration quotas.

=== Bombing of the SS Patria in Haifa ===
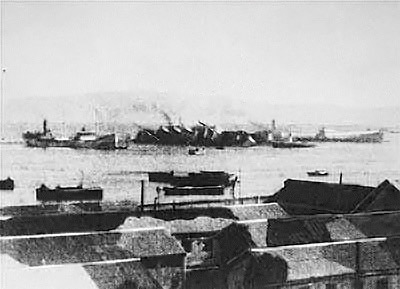
In 1940 a Haganah bomb sank the SS Patria, killing 267 people.

In 1940 the Haganah sabotaged the Patria, an ocean liner being used by the British to deport 1,800 Jews to Mauritius, with a bomb intended to cripple the ship. However, the ship sank, killing 267 people and injuring 172.

=== World War II ===
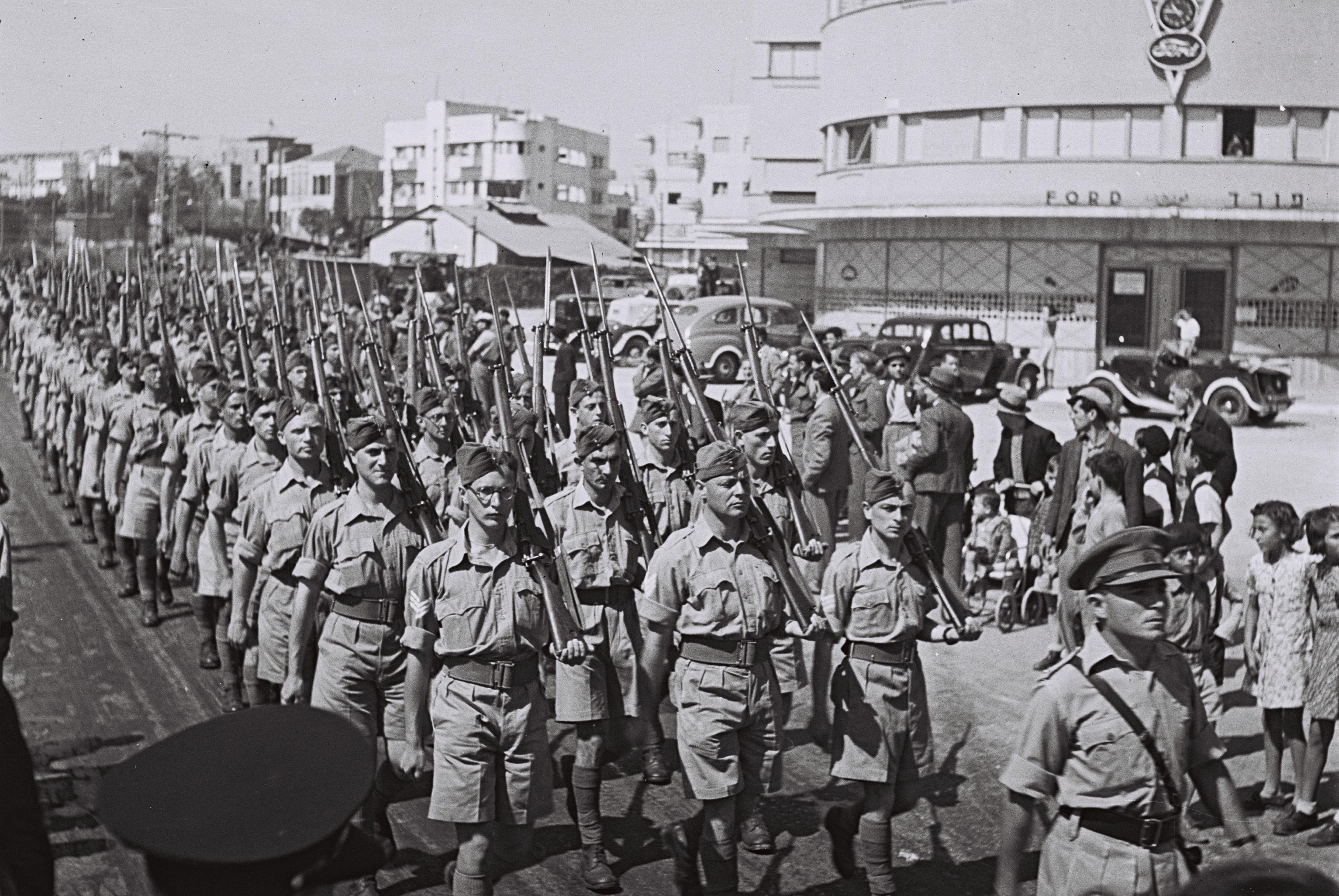
Marching Jewish troops in the British army (1942)

In the first years of World War II, the British authorities asked Haganah for cooperation again, due to the fear of an Axis breakthrough in North Africa. After Rommel was defeated at El Alamein in 1942, the British stepped back from their all-out support for Haganah. In 1943, after a long series of requests and negotiations, the British Army announced the creation of the Jewish Brigade Group. While Palestinian Jews had been permitted to enlist in the British army since 1940, this was the first time an exclusively Jewish military unit served in the war under a Jewish flag. The Jewish Brigade Group consisted of 5,000 soldiers and was initially deployed with the 8th Army in North Africa and later in Italy in September 1944. The brigade was disbanded in 1946. All in all, some 30,000 Palestinian Jews served in the British army during the war.

On May 14, 1941, the Haganah created the Palmach (an acronym for Plugot Mahatz—strike companies), an elite commando section, in preparation against the possibility of a British withdrawal and Axis invasion of Palestine. Its members, young men and women, received specialist training in guerrilla tactics and sabotage. During 1942 the British gave assistance in the training of Palmach volunteers but in early 1943 they withdrew their support and attempted to disarm them. The Palmach, then numbering over 1,000, continued as an underground organization with its members working half of each month as kibbutz volunteers, the rest of the month spent training. It was never large—by 1947 it amounted to merely five battalions (about 2,000 men)—but its members had not only received physical and military training, but also acquired leadership skills that would subsequently enable them to take up command positions in Israel's army.

==== "The Saison" post-assassination of Lord Moyne ====
In 1944, after the assassination of Lord Moyne (the British Minister of State for the Middle East) by members of the Lehi, the Haganah worked with the British to kidnap, interrogate, and, in some cases, deport Irgun members. This action, which lasted from November 1944 to February 1945, was called the Saison, or the Hunting Season, and was directed against the Irgun and not the Lehi. Future Jerusalem mayor Teddy Kollek was later revealed to be a Jewish Agency liaison officer working with the British authorities who had passed on information that led to the arrest of many Irgun activists.

Many Jewish youth, who had joined the Haganah in order to defend the Jewish people, were greatly demoralized by operations against their own people. The Irgun, paralyzed by the Saison, were ordered by their commander, Menachem Begin, not to retaliate in an effort to avoid a full blown civil war. Although many Irgunists objected to these orders, they obeyed Begin and refrained from fighting back. The Saison eventually ended due to perceived British betrayal of the Yishuv becoming more obvious to the public and increased opposition from Haganah members.

=== Post–World War II ===
Haganah members in training (1947)

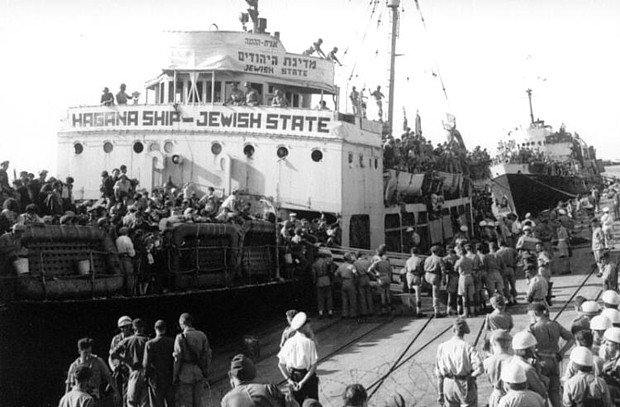
Haganah ship Jewish State carrying illegal Jewish immigrants from Europe at the Haifa Port (1947)

The Saison officially ended when the Haganah, Irgun and the Lehi formed the Jewish Resistance Movement, in 1945. Within this new framework, the three groups agreed to operate under a joint command. They had different functions, which served to drive the British out of Palestine and create a Jewish state.

The Haganah was less active in the Jewish Rebellion than the other two groups, but the Palmach did carry out anti-British operations, including a raid on the Atlit detainee camp that released 208 illegal immigrants, the Night of the Trains, the Night of the Bridges, and attacks on Palestine Police bases. The Haganah withdrew on 1 July 1946, but "remained permanently unco-operative" with the British authorities. It continued to organize illegal Jewish immigration as part of the Aliyah Bet program, in which ships carrying illegal immigrants attempted to breach the British blockade of Palestine and land illegal immigrants on the shore (most were intercepted by the Royal Navy), and the Palmach performed operations against the British to support the illegal immigration program. The Palmach repeatedly bombed British radar stations being used to track illegal immigrant ships, and sabotaged British ships being used to deport illegal immigrants, as well as two British landing and patrol craft. The Palmach performed a single assassination operation in which a British official who had been judged to be excessively cruel to Jewish prisoners was shot dead. The Haganah also organized the Birya affair. Following the expulsion of the residents of the Jewish settlement of Birya for illegal weapons possession, thousands of Jewish youth organized by the Haganah marched to the site and rebuilt the settlement. They were expelled by British shortly afterward while showing passive resistance, but after they returned a third time, the British backed off and allowed them to remain.

In addition to its operations, the Haganah continued to secretly prepare for a war with the Arabs once the British left by building up its arms and munitions stocks. It maintained a secret arms industry, with the most significant facility being an underground "bullet factory" underneath Ayalon, a kibbutz that had been established specifically to cover it up.

British estimates of the Haganah's strength at this time were a paper strength of 75,000 men and women with an effective strength of 30,000. After the British army, the Haganah was considered the most powerful military force in the Middle East. Research by Amos Perlmutter estimated that the Haganah budget in 1946 was £400,000, and by October 1947 its budget had reached £3.3 million. The same source estimated that the membership of the Haganah was 7% of the Jewish population in Palestine.

In July 1947, eager to maintain order with the visit of UNSCOP to Palestine and under heavy pressure from the British authorities to resume collaboration, the Jewish Agency reluctantly came into brief conflict with the Irgun and Lehi, and ordered the Haganah to put a stop to the operations of the other two groups for the time being. As Palmach members refused to participate, a unit of about 200 men from regular Haganah units was mobilized, and foiled several operations against the British, including a potentially devastating attack on the British military headquarters at Citrus House in Tel Aviv, in which a Haganah member was killed by an Irgun bomb. The Haganah also joined the search for two British sergeants abducted by the Irgun as hostages against the death sentences of three Irgun members in what became known as the Sergeants affair. The Jewish Agency leadership feared the damage this act would do to the Jewish cause, and also believed that holding the hostages would only jeopardize the fates of the three condemned Irgun members. The attempts to free the sergeants failed, and following the executions of the three Irgun members, the two sergeants were killed and hanged in a eucalyptus grove. However, the campaign soon disintegrated into a series of retaliatory abductions and beatings of each other's members by the Haganah and Irgun, and eventually petered out. The campaign was dubbed the "Little Season" by the Irgun.

=== Reorganization ===
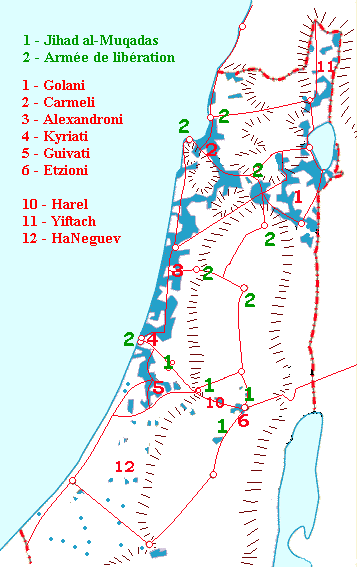
Theatre of Operation of each Haganah brigade.

After "having gotten the Jews of Palestine and of elsewhere to do everything that they could, personally and financially, to help Yishuv," Ben-Gurion's second-greatest achievement was his having successfully transformed Haganah from being a clandestine paramilitary organization into a true army. Ben-Gurion appointed Israel Galili to the position of head of the High Command counsel of Haganah and divided Haganah into six infantry brigades, numbered 1 to 6, allotting a precise theatre of operation to each one. Yaakov Dori was named Chief of Staff, but it was Yigael Yadin who assumed the responsibility on the ground as chief of Operations. Palmach, commanded by Yigal Allon, was divided into three elite brigades, numbered 10–12, and constituted the mobile force of Haganah. Ben-Gurion's attempts to retain personal control over the newly formed IDF culminated with the Generals' Revolt.

On 19 November 1947, obligatory conscription was instituted for all men and women aged between 17 and 25. By end of March 21,000 people had been conscripted. On 30 March the call-up was extended to men and single women aged between 26 and 35. Five days later a General Mobilization order was issued for all men under 40.

"From November 1947, the Haganah ... began to change from a territorial militia into a regular army. ... Few of the units had been well trained by December. ... By March–April, it fielded still under-equipped battalion and brigades. By April–May, the Haganah was conducting brigade size offensive.

The brigades of the Haganah which merged into the IDF once this was created on 26 May 1948:

The northern Levanoni Brigade, located in the Galilee, was split on February 22, 1948 into the 1st and 2nd Brigades.

- The 1st or Golani Brigade – was deployed in the Lower Galilee
- The 2nd or Carmeli Brigade – was deployed in the north and took its name after its commander, Moshe Carmel
- The 3rd or Alexandroni Brigade – headquartered in Netanya, it covered the area from Tel Aviv to Zichron Ya'akov
- The 4th or Kiryati Brigade – formed in 1948 in the Tel Aviv area
- The 5th or Givati Brigade – formed in December 1947. During civil war the Givati Brigade was deployed in the central region, and during the conventional war in the south as the 5th Brigade
- The 6th or Etzioni or Jerusalem Brigade – formed on December 1, 1947 and dismantled in the summer of 1949
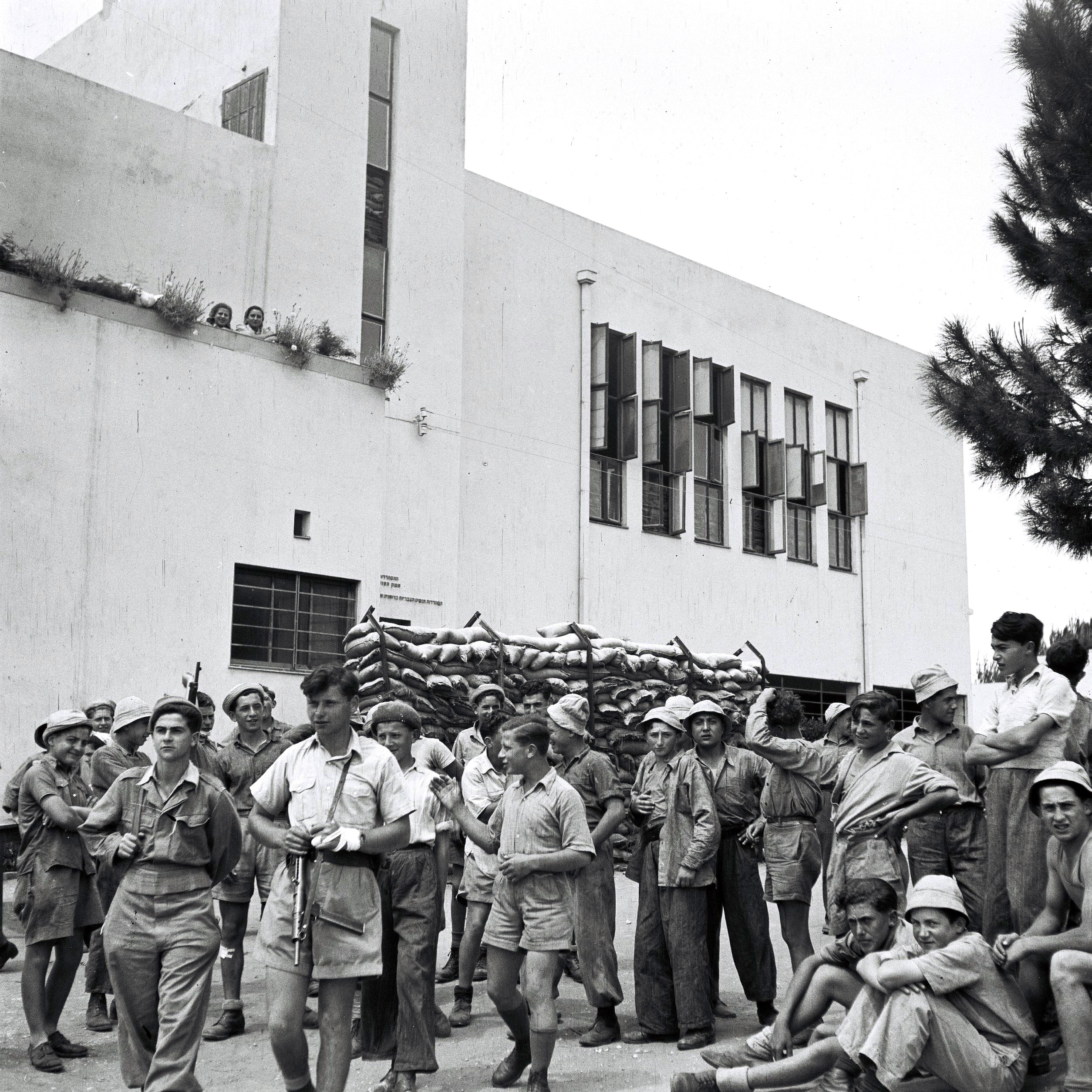
  The Haganah mobilized Jewish youth for military training.

To the initial six brigades, three were added later during the war:

- The 7th Brigade, in Hebrew "Hativat Sheva" – formed in 1948, manned mainly with Holocaust survivors and including a number of Machal troops. Almost annihilated at Latrun, then re-formed in the north. It had tanks and mounted infantry.
- The 8th Brigade – founded on May 24, 1948, and subordinated to Yitzhak Sadeh as the IDF's first armoured brigade, headquartered near Jerusalem.
- The 9th or Oded Brigade – headquartered in Jerusalem.

The Palmach brigades which merged into the IDF:

- The 10th or Harel Brigade – established on 16 April 1948
- The 11th or Yiftach Brigade
- The 12th or Negev Brigade – established in March 1948

=== 1948 Arab–Israeli War ===
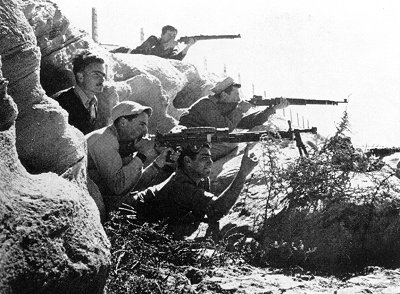
Haganah fighters in 1947

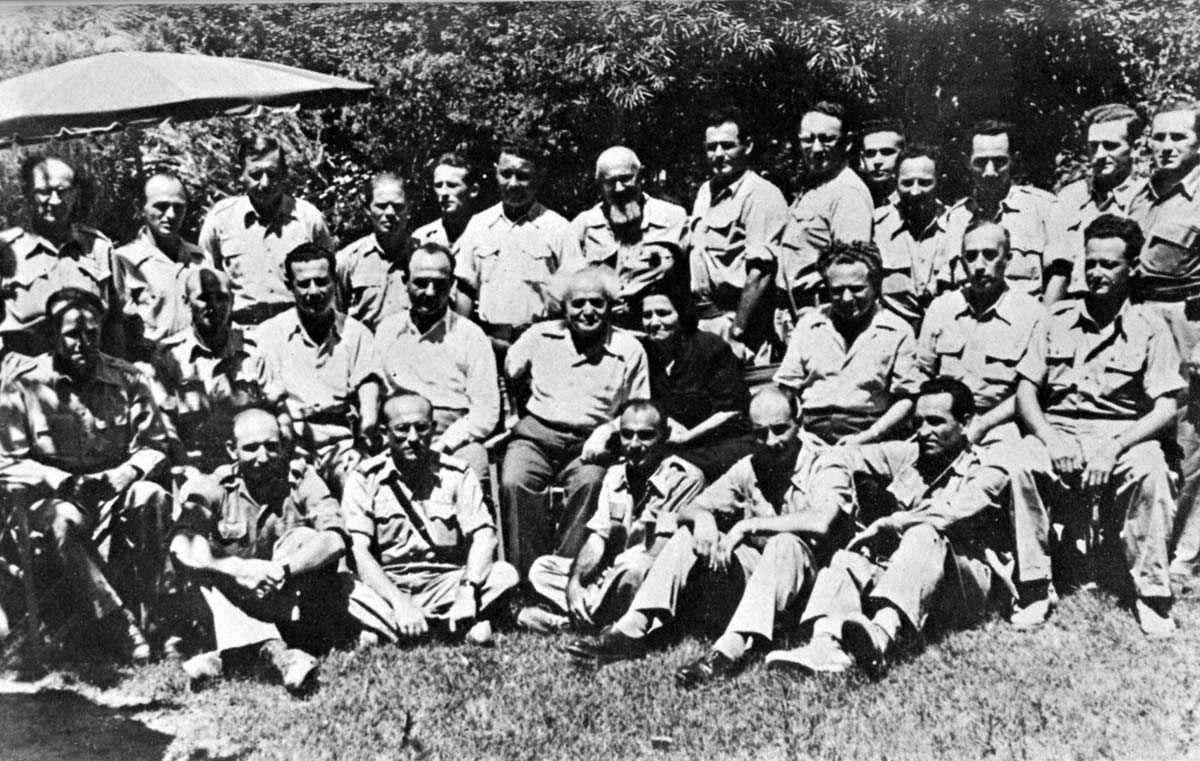
Haganah High Command on the eve of the creation of the IDF, June 1948

After the British announced they would withdraw from Palestine, and the United Nations approved the partition of Palestine, the 1947–1948 civil war in Mandatory Palestine broke out. The Haganah played the leading role in the Yishuv's war with the Palestinian Arabs. Initially, it concentrated on defending Jewish areas from Arab raids, but after the danger of British intervention subsided as the British withdrew, the Haganah went on the offensive and seized more territory. Following the Israeli Declaration of Independence and the start of the 1948 Arab–Israeli War on May 15, 1948, the Haganah, now the army of the new state, engaged the invading armies of the surrounding Arab states.

On May 28, 1948, less than two weeks after the creation of the state of Israel on May 15, the provisional government created the Israel Defense Forces, merging the Haganah, Irgun, and Lehi, although the other two groups continued to operate independently in Jerusalem and abroad for some time after. The reorganization led to several conflicts between Ben-Gurion and the Haganah leadership, including what was known as the Generals' Revolt and the dismantling of the Palmach.

Famous members of the Haganah included Yitzhak Rabin, Ariel Sharon, Rehavam Ze'evi, Dov Hoz, Moshe Dayan, Yigal Allon and Dr. Ruth Westheimer.

The Museum of Underground Prisoners in Jerusalem commemorates the activity of the underground groups in the pre-state period, recreating the everyday life of those imprisoned there.

=== Pal-Heib Unit for Bedouins ===
Some Bedouins had longstanding ties with nearby Jewish communities. They helped defend these communities in the 1936–1939 Arab revolt in Palestine. During the 1948 Arab–Israeli War, some Bedouins of Tuba formed an alliance with the Haganah defending Jewish communities in the Upper Galilee against Syria. Some were part of a Pal-Heib unit of the Haganah. Sheik Hussein Mohammed Ali Abu Yussef of Tuba was quoted in 1948 as saying, "Is it not written in the Koran that the ties of neighbors are as dear as those of relations? Our friendship with the Jews goes back for many years. We felt we could trust them and they learned from us too".

== See also ==
- Jewish Agency for Israel, the organization that governed Haganah
- Sherut Avir, the Haganah aerial service
- Palmach, the elite fighting force of Haganah
  - Palavir, the Palmach aerial service
  - Palyam, the Palmach naval service
- Irgun, a Zionist paramilitary that broke away from Haganah in 1931
- Lehi, a Zionist paramilitary that broke away from Irgun in 1940
- Eliyahu Golomb, the chief architect of Haganah
