= Mikron =

Mikron may refer to:

- Mikron Group, a Russian electronics manufacturer
- Mikron Holding, a Swiss company specializing in machining and assembly systems
- Micron Technology, an American multinational semiconductor company
- Mikron O'Jeneus, the first villain known as Gizmo in the DC Comics universe
- Mikron Theatre Company, an English theatre company that tours by canal boat
- Walter Mikron, a Czech aircraft engine
  - Parma Mikron III UL, an engine development for ultralight aircraft

== See also ==
- Micron (disambiguation)
