= Yakovlev Yak-20 =

Yak-20

General information
- Type: Trainer aircraft
- Manufacturer: Yakovlev
- Number built: 2

History
- First flight: 1949

The Yakovlev Yak-20 (Russian: Яковлев Як-20) was an experimental piston-engined trainer developed in the Soviet Union in 1949. It did not go into production.

== Design and development ==
In 1949 the Yak-20 was designed by the Yakovlev OKB for use with aviation clubs as a trainer and sport aircraft. Intended to be the cheapest modern aircraft that could serve as a useful pilot trainer and aerobatic sport aircraft, the Yak-20 was intended to be considerably cheaper to build and operate than the contemporary Yak-18.

Though structurally similar to the Yak-18, the Yak-20 had a welded steel tube fuselage which was skinned with aluminium alloy sheet and fabric, with aluminium alloy wings, skinned in metal back to the single spar, and fabric aft of the spar. Accommodation was side by side under a large blown canopy, which slid open to the rear. The cockpit had dual stick controls, with the pilot sitting on the left. There was a central push-pull throttle, and simple gyro instruments. The engine was the newly developed Ivchenko AI-10 five-cylinder radial. This engine was small and extremely light. It was rated at 80 hp, driving a V-515 controllable-pitch counterweight propeller. Fuel was carried in two 35 liter (7.7 gallon) tanks in the wing roots, ahead of the single spar.

== Operational history ==
The Yak-20 was designed from the start to be fully aerobatic with very high spin resistance. The two prototypes were tested by pilots Anokhin and Georgii Shiyanov, and later by DOSAAF pilots, as well as a succession of leading aerobatic sport pilots who were invited to fly it. All were eager to see it put into production. State Acceptance trials followed, but the State evaluation team considered the Yak-20 too small and underpowered, recommending a redesign to match the performance of the Yak-18. Some of the criticisms of the State evaluation team were addressed in the second prototype, (Yak-20-2), which, as a result, became heavier and lost the performance edge of the first prototype. With Yak-18 production already in full swing, production of the Yak-20 was deemed superfluous. The final blow came when production of the small Ivchenko AI-10 engine was cancelled.

== Variants ==
Yak-20-1
First Prototype.
Yak-20-2
Second Prototype

== Specifications (Yak-20-1) ==
Data from , Yakovlev aircraft since 1924

General characteristics

- Crew: 2
- Length: 7.06 m (23 ft 2 in)
- Wingspan: 9.56 m (31 ft 4 in)
- Wing area: 15 m^{2} (160 sq ft)
- Empty weight: 470 kg (1,036 lb)
- Gross weight: 700 kg (1,543 lb)
- Fuel capacity: 70 L (18 US gal; 15 imp gal) fuel; 10 kg (22 lb) oil
- Powerplant: 1 × Ivchenko AI-10 5-cylinder air-cooled radial piston engine, 60 kW (80 hp)
- Propellers: 2-bladed V-515 variable-pitch counterweight-type propeller

Performance

- Maximum speed: 160 km/h (99 mph, 86 kn)
- Cruise speed: 142 km/h (88 mph, 77 kn) *Landing speed: 60 km/h (37 mph; 32 kn)
- Take-off run: 70 m (230 ft)
- Landing run: 80 m (260 ft)
- Range: 400 km (250 mi, 220 nmi)
- Service ceiling: 3,000 m (9,800 ft)
- Time to altitude: 1,000 m (3,300 ft) in 9.8 minutes
- Power/mass: 0.085 kW/kg (0.052 hp/lb)

== See also ==
Related development

- Yakovlev Yak-18

Aircraft of comparable role, configuration, and era

- ERCO Ercoupe
- Ryan Navion
- RWD 21
- Utva Trojka
- Zlín 22

Related lists

- List of civil aircraft
