= G26 =

G26 may refer to:

- Brazilian landing ship Duque de Caxias (G26), a De Soto County-class tank landing ship of the Brazilian Navy
- EMD G26, an American locomotive
- Gribovsky G-26, a Soviet aircraft
- Glock 26, a firearm
- HNoMS Stord (G26), an S-class destroyer of the Royal Norwegian Navy
