= Notteghem monoplane =

1910s French aircraft

Notteghem

General information
- Type: Tourism aircraft
- National origin: France
- Designer: Louis Notteghem
- Number built: 1

History
- First flight: 30 November 1951

The Notteghem monoplane was a touring aircraft built in France in the early 1950s.

== Design ==
The Notteghem monoplane featured a low-wing monoplane layout of mixed construction.

== Specifications ==
Data from Aviafrance : Notteghem

General characteristics

- Crew: 1
- Length: 6.22 m (20 ft 5 in)
- Wingspan: 7.00 m (23 ft 0 in)
- Wing area: 7.00 m^{2} (75.3 sq ft)
- Empty weight: 250 kg (551 lb)
- Gross weight: 385 kg (849 lb)
- Powerplant: 1 × Walter Mikron 4-cylinder inverted air-cooled in-line piston engine, 45 kW (60 hp)

Performance

- Maximum speed: 215 km/h (134 mph, 116 kn)
- Cruise speed: 190 km/h (120 mph, 100 kn)
- Range: 1,100 km (680 mi, 590 nmi)
