= Air guard =

Air guard or Airguard may refer to:

- Air National Guard, part of the US air force
- Various local air guards, such as Indiana Air Guard
- Civil Air Guard, UK
- T&T Air Guard, branch of Trinidad and Tobago Defence Force
- Air Guard, air rescue service Rega (Switzerland)
- Chrislea Airguard, 1930s British two-seat cabin monoplane
- Chengdu F-7M Airguard, China's license-built version of the MiG-21
- AirGuard, fictional missile defense system in the 1998 American film Snake Eyes
- 2010 Air Guard 400, NASCAR Sprint Cup Series stock car race
