= B&F Fk131 Bücker Jungmann =

German ultralight airplane

Fk131 Bücker Jungmann
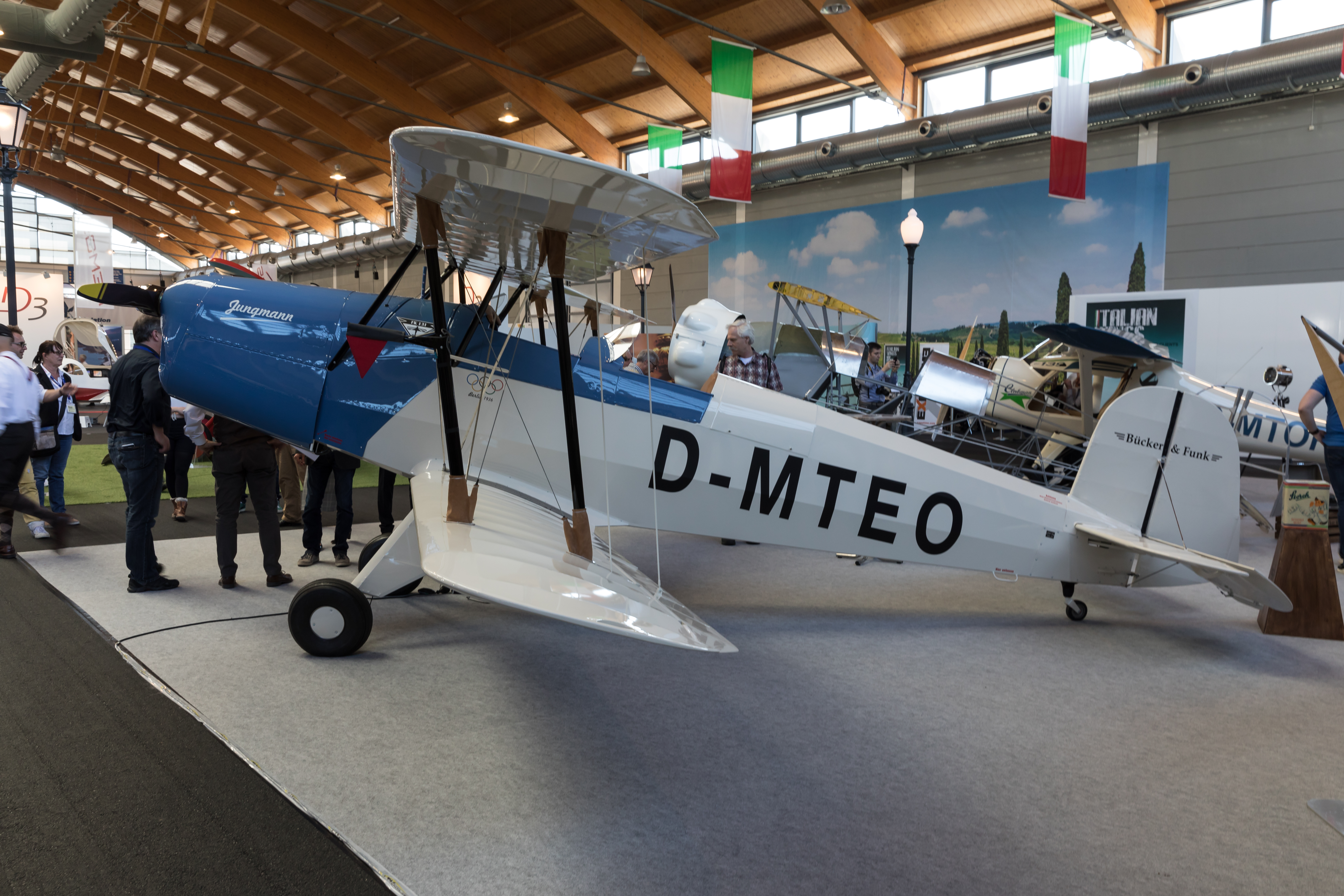

General information
- Type: Ultralight aircraft
- National origin: Germany
- Manufacturer: Podesva Air
- Designer: B&F Technik Vertriebs GmbH Peter Funk (Designer)
- Status: Production completed (2017)
- Number built: 10

History
- Manufactured: 2013
- Introduction date: 2013
- Developed from: Bücker Bü 131 Jungmann

The B&F Fk131 Bücker Jungmann (transl. freshman, young man) (Note: Commonly translated as young man, but often used to refer to a freshman, or a member of an organization in their first year, per Sarjeant, 1971, p.253.) is a German ultralight and homebuilt aircraft with the project design headed by B&F Technik Vertriebs GmbH of Speyer and the aircraft produced by Podesva Air of the Czech Republic, introduced at the AERO Friedrichshafen show in 2013. The aircraft was built in a production run of ten aircraft and supplied complete and ready-to-fly. By 2017 it was no longer advertised for sale.

The aircraft is a replica of the 1934 Bücker Bü 131 Jungmann.

== Design and development ==
The project to produce a batch of Bücker Bü 131 Jungmann replicas was headed by B&F's Peter Funk. Production commenced in 2013 with an initial batch of ten aircraft. The aircraft were to be eligible for the Fédération Aéronautique Internationale microlight rules at a gross weight of 472.5 kg (1,042 lb) and experimental aircraft rules at a gross weight of 520 kg (1,146 lb).

The design features a wire and strut-braced biplane layout, a two-seats in tandem open cockpit, fixed conventional landing gear and a single engine in tractor configuration.

The aircraft duplicates the original 1934 Bü 131's construction. Its 7.25 m (23.8 ft) span wing is supported by cabane struts and a single set of parallel interplane struts outboard on the wings, with wire bracing. The standard engine used is the 82 hp (61 kW) Walter Micron IIIC four-stroke, inverted four cylinder, air-cooled powerplant.

== Specifications (Fk131) ==
Data from Tacke

General characteristics

- Crew: one
- Capacity: one passenger
- Length: 6.62 m (21 ft 9 in)
- Wingspan: 7.25 m (23 ft 9 in)
- Wing area: 13.20 m^{2} (142.1 sq ft)
- Empty weight: 297 kg (655 lb)
- Gross weight: 472.5 kg (1,042 lb) (ultralight)
- Fuel capacity: 70 litres (15 imp gal; 18 US gal)
- Powerplant: 1 × Walter Micron IIIC four cylinder, inverted, air-cooled, four stroke aircraft engine, 61 kW (82 hp)
- Propellers: 2-bladed fixed pitch

Performance

- Maximum speed: 170 km/h (110 mph, 92 kn)
- Cruise speed: 150 km/h (93 mph, 81 kn)
- Stall speed: 67 km/h (42 mph, 36 kn) (power off)
- Never exceed speed: 251 km/h (156 mph, 136 kn)
- Range: 600 km (370 mi, 320 nmi) (45 min reserves)
- Rate of climb: 2.9 m/s (570 ft/min)
