= Gribovsky G-26 =

1930 sportplane model by Gribovsky

General information
- Type: High performance sports aircraft
- National origin: USSR
- Manufacturer: Vladislav Gribovsky
- Designer: c.1938
- Number built: 1

The Gribovsky G-26 (Russian: Грибовский Г-26) was a single seat sports aircraft designed for high performance in the USSR in the later 1930s. Only one was built.

== Design and development ==
The G-26 was a low wing monoplane designed for performance and powered by a 108 kW (145 hp), air-cooled four cylinder inverted inline MG-40 engine. In appearance it was rather like the Gribovsky G-22, though it was smaller with a 1.0 m (3 ft 3 in) shorter span and 10% less wing area. An obvious external difference was the position of the open cockpit, which was set back well behind the wing trailing edge on the G-26 rather than over mid-chord. Structurally the two designs were almost identical. In plan their single spar wings had a short parallel chord centre section and strongly straight tapered outer panels with the greatest taper on the trailing edges and with elliptical tips. The wing was plywood covered ahead of the spar and fabric covered aft.

Both models also had flat sided, truss framed fuselages, with rounded upper decking ahead of the cockpits. Behind the G-26 cockpit the raised upper fuselage continued to the tail. As on the G-22, the fin and the fabric covered, unbalanced rudder of the G-26 together had an elliptic profile. Its tailplane was set well back, with its leading edge only a little ahead of the rudder hinge line; the elevators were hinged behind the rudder.

Because it was designed for performance it was not a beginner's aircraft, though modifications made in 1939 improved its handling.

== Specifications ==
Data from Gunston (1995), p.80-1

General characteristics

- Crew: One
- Length: 6.0 m (19 ft 8 in)
- Wingspan: 7.7 m (25 ft 3 in)
- Wing area: 9.0 m^{2} (97 sq ft)
- Powerplant: 1 × MG-40 air-cooled 4-cylinder inverted inline, 108 kW (145 hp)
- Propellers: 2-bladed

Performance

- Maximum speed: 290 km/h (180 mph, 160 kn)
- Range: 350 km (220 mi, 190 nmi)
