= RWD 16 =

RWD-16
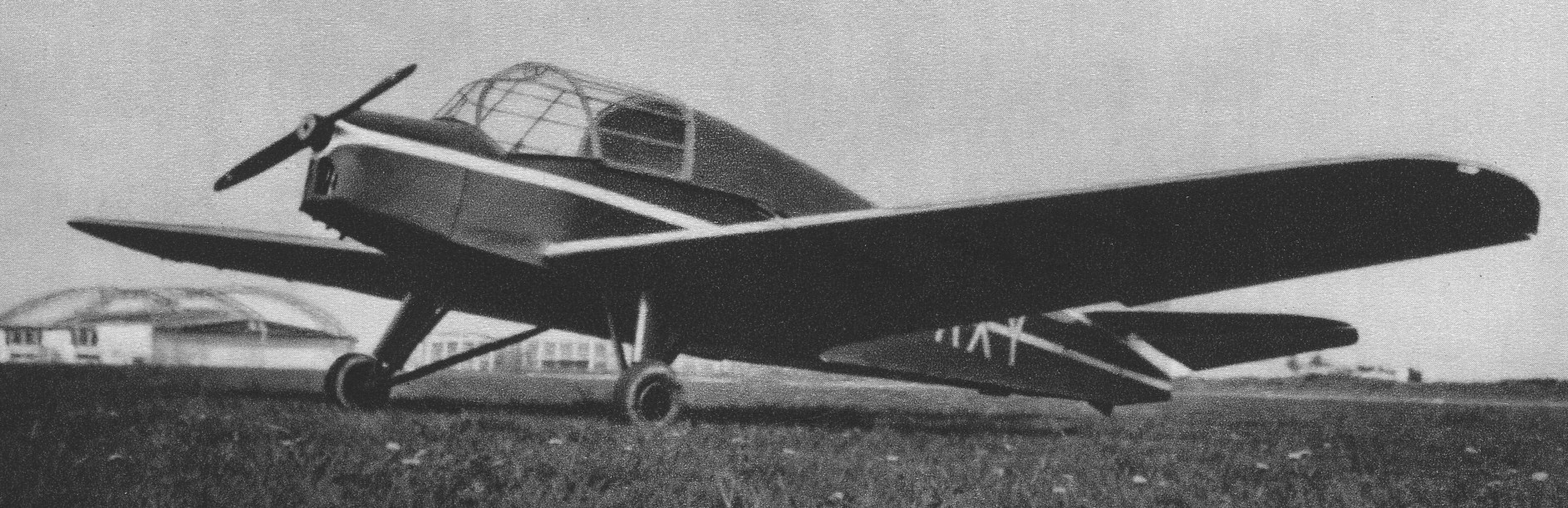
- RWD-16 in its initial shape

General information
- Type: Sports plane
- National origin: Poland
- Manufacturer: DWL
- Designer: RWD team
- Status: prototype
- Primary user: Poland
- Number built: 1

History
- First flight: 1936
- Variant: RWD-16bis

The RWD-16 was a Polish two-seat low-wing sports plane of 1936, constructed by the RWD team, that remained a prototype.

== Development ==
The aircraft was designed in 1935 by Andrzej Anczutin of the RWD bureau, as a light and economical sports plane. The plane was a wooden low-wing monoplane, with two seats side-by-side in a closed cockpit, powered by 50 hp Walter Mikron I straight engine.

The prototype was built and first flown in early 1936 (registration SP-AXY), funded by the Polish division of Osram factory. The plane did not appear a successful design, though. Test revealed lack of directional stability, therefore its rudder was much enlarged, the wings were fitted with fixed slats and a windshield was redesigned. It did not improve the situation much, and in 1937-1938 the prototype was rebuilt and fitted with stronger 60 hp Avia 3 engine in a lengthened nose, while the vertical stabilizer and rudder were made smaller. Most significant feature became a front windshield with a negative slope.

After final changes, the prototype still was not satisfactory, but it served as a basis for the RWD-16bis design, which was a new, redesigned aircraft, produced as the RWD-21. The prototype RWD-16 was given then to a known touring aviator Zbigniew Babiński.

== Description ==
Wooden construction low-wing cantilever monoplane, conventional in layout, with a fixed landing gear and a closed cockpit. The fuselage was semi-monocoque, plywood-covered. Single-piece trapezoid wings with rounded tips, two-spar, plywood (in front) and canvas covered. Conventional cantilever empennage, plywood (fins) and canvas (elevators and rudder) covered. Two seats side-by-side, with twin controls, under a common canopy, with a fixed windshield. Conventional fixed landing gear with a rear skid.

50 hp (37 kW) Walter Mikron I inline engine in front, with two-blade wooden propeller Szomański, 1.8 m diameter. In later variant, 60 hp (45 kW) Avia 3 inline engine was installed.

== Specifications (RWD 16bis) ==
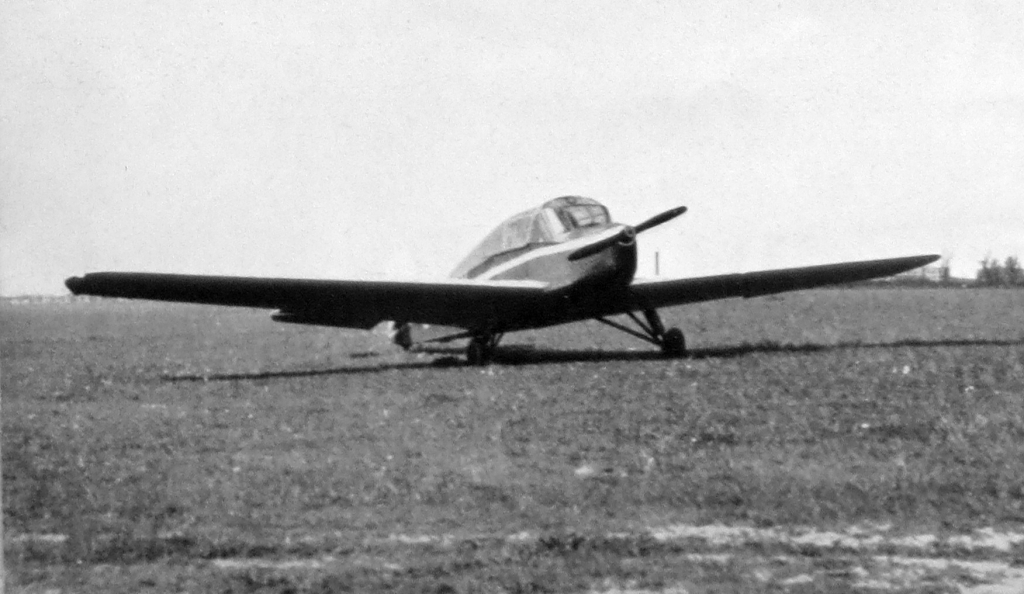
Walter Mikron a RWD-16 (1936)

Data from Polish aircraft 1893-1939, Polskie konstrukcje lotnicze 1893–1939

General characteristics

- Crew: 1
- Capacity: 1
- Length: 7.8 m (25 ft 7 in)
- Wingspan: 11 m (36 ft 1 in)
- Height: 2.27 m (7 ft 5 in)
- Wing area: 14.9 m^{2} (160 sq ft)
- Airfoil: root: Warsaw Aerodynamic Institute 16%; tip: Warsaw Aerodynamic Institute 10%
- Empty weight: 385 kg (849 lb)
- Gross weight: 615 kg (1,356 lb)
- Fuel capacity: 73 L (19 US gal; 16 imp gal) in a centre-section tank; 7 L (1.8 US gal; 1.5 imp gal) oil
- Powerplant: 1 × Avia 3 4-cylinder inverted air-cooled in-line piston engine, 45–48 kW (60–64 hp)

or Walter Mikron

- Propellers: 2-bladed Szomański, 1.75 m (5 ft 9 in) diameter fixed-pitch wooden propeller

Performance

- Maximum speed: 180 km/h (110 mph, 97 kn) at sea level
- Cruise speed: 155 km/h (96 mph, 84 kn)
- Landing speed: 70 km/h (43 mph; 38 kn)
- Range: 700 km (430 mi, 380 nmi)
- Service ceiling: 4,150 m (13,620 ft)
- Time to altitude: 1,000 m (3,300 ft) in 6 minutes 30 seconds
- Wing loading: 41.5 kg/m^{2} (8.5 lb/sq ft)
- Power/mass: 0.0768 kW/kg (0.0467 hp/lb)
