= Johansen CAJO 59 =

CAJO 59

General information
- Type: Light amphibious aircraft
- National origin: Denmark
- Designer: Carl Johansen
- Number built: 1

History
- First flight: 23 July 1967

The Johansen CAJO 59 was a Danish twin-engined amphibious flying boat. Built in the late 1960s, it achieved certification but did not go into production.

== Design and development ==
The CAJO 59 was designed by Carl Johansen (hence the name) as a general purpose 3-4 seat amphibious flying boat. It was a high-gull winged twin-engine monoplane with a wooden structure, mostly wooden skinned, apart from glass fibre/foam sandwich panels in the fuselage and fabric covered control surfaces. The wings inboard of the engines were built around two spars and had high dihedral (8.8°), which raised the engines well above the water. Outboard of the engines the wings had a single spar and were without dihedral. They carried full span slotted flaps and ailerons which were lowered when the flaps were fully extended.

The fuselage was flat sided with rounded decking, with the cabin under the wings. Its conventional flying boat V-shaped planing bottom had a change of curvature near midpoint but no discrete step. The vertical tail was straight-tapered, the rudder fitted with a trim tab. The cantilever variable incidence tailplane, with elevators, was mounted above the fuselage at about one third fin height.

The CAJO 59 was powered by two 65 hp (49 kW) Walter Mikron III inverted inline engines. Two fixed floats, mounted well outboard on single struts, stabilised flights off water. It had a manually retractable tricycle wheeled undercarriage, with main legs mounted on the fuselage and retracting into it above the waterline.

The first flight was made from water on 25 July 1967 and the first from land on 17 April 1968. Certification facilities were lacking in Denmark, so the CAJO 59 was taken to Germany and flew as D-GDFH during 1970.

== Specifications ==
Data from Jane's All the World's Aircraft 1970.

General characteristics

- Crew: one
- Capacity: two-three passengers
- Length: 6.95 m (22 ft 10 in)
- Wingspan: 9.80 m (32 ft 2 in)
- Height: 2.75 m (9 ft 0 in)
- Wing area: 12.80 m^{2} (137.8 sq ft)
- Empty weight: 580 kg (1,279 lb)
- Max takeoff weight: 900 kg (1,984 lb)
- Powerplant: 2 × Walter Mikron III 4-cylinder inverted in line air cooled, 48 kW (65 hp) each
- Propellers: 2-bladed , wooden

Performance

- Maximum speed: 215 km/h (134 mph, 116 kn)
- Cruise speed: 200 km/h (120 mph, 110 kn)
- Range: 1,000 km (620 mi, 540 nmi) with maximum fuel
- Rate of climb: 4.5 m/s (890 ft/min)

all at maximum take-off weight

== See also ==
Related lists

- List of flying boats and floatplanes
