= Chrislea Super Ace =

Super Ace
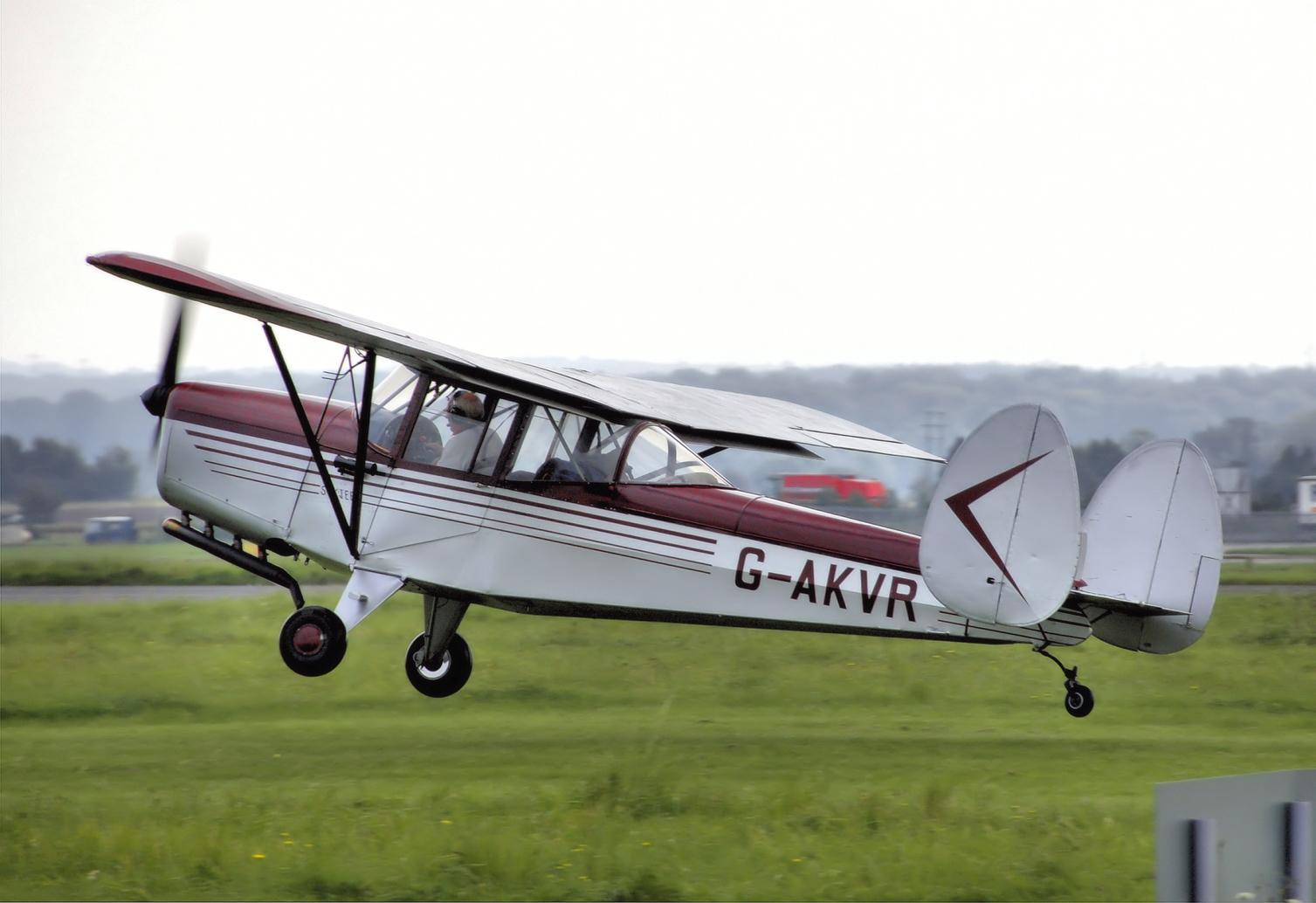
- Chrislea CH3 Series 4 Skyjeep, manufactured 1951

General information
- Type: light aircraft
- Manufacturer: Chrislea Aircraft Limited
- Designer: R.C. Christoforides
- Number built: 21

History
- Manufactured: 1948-1952
- First flight: 1948

The Chrislea Super Ace is a 1940s British four-seat light aircraft built by Chrislea Aircraft Limited.

== History ==
The Super Ace was developed from the earlier Chrislea C.H.3 Series 1 Ace, a high-wing four seat cabin monoplane with a tricycle undercarriage and two fins. The Ace had an unusual 'steering wheel' control arrangement which eliminated the conventional rudder bar. The wheel was mounted on a universal joint; turning it applied aileron, moving it vertically applied elevator and sideways the rudder. It originally flew with a single vertical tail but was soon modified with twin fins. The lone C.H.3 Series 1 Ace first flew in September 1946.

Soon after the company moved to Exeter, the first production aircraft, the C.H.3 Series 2 Super Ace flew in February 1948. This model was powered by a de Havilland Gipsy Major 10 inline piston engine. Wing and tailplane were now metal structures, the span was increased by 2 ft compared with the Ace, and the fins were smaller and rounder. The control system of the first Super Ace was not well received and, as a result, that aircraft and all other Series 3 machines had a rudder bar. Construction was initiated on a production run of 32 aircraft, but only 18 Super Aces were completed and flown. Only 3 of these stayed in the UK; the rest were either immediately exported (12), exported after time in the UK (2) or worked abroad under British registration in the Near East (1). Super Aces flew in Europe (Switzerland), Africa (Gold Coast, South Africa), Asia (Japan, British Malaya, Pakistan), South America (Argentina, Brazil) and Australasia (Australia, New Zealand).

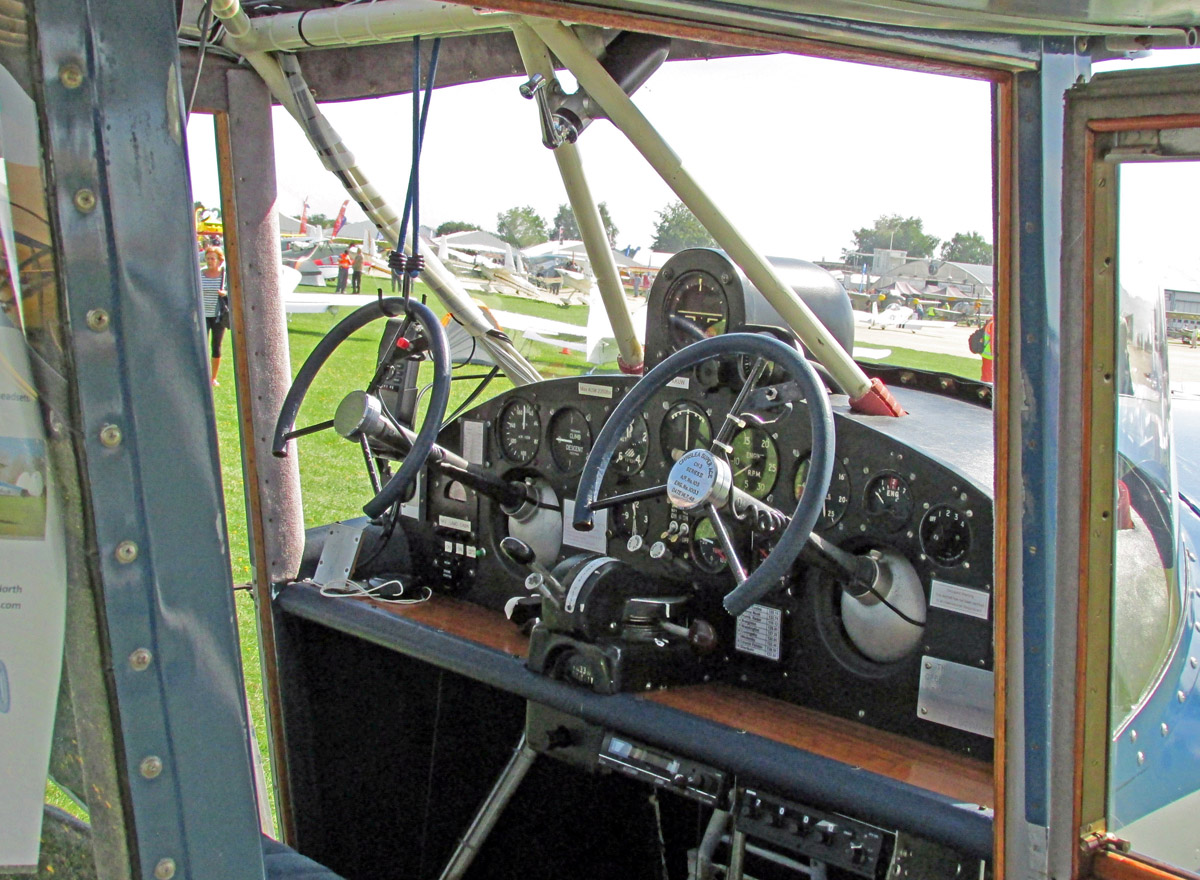
Cabin detail showing the unusual twin "steering wheel" controls jutting out from the instrument panel

The final variant, taken from the Super Ace production run, was the C.H.3 Series 4 Skyjeep, first flown in August 1949. The Skyjeep had a tailwheel landing gear, a conventional control stick instead of the wheel and removable top decking on the rear fuselage. A fuselage stretch of 8.5 in improved the legroom and, combined with the accessible rear fuselage, provided a more flexible internal space. It was powered by a 155 hp Blackburn Cirrus Major 3 engine.

In all, three Skyjeeps were built and sold in Uruguay, Indochina and Australia. The Australian machine flew there with a 200 hp de Havilland Gipsy Six engine for a time, but has since been refitted with the Cirrus and is now flying in the UK.

Sales of the two types were disappointing and 11 of the 32 planned were either not completed (6) or built but not flown (5). These were scrapped in 1952 when the company assets were bought by C.E. Harper Aircraft Limited.

== Variants ==
C.H.3 Series 1 Ace
four-seat high-wing monoplane with tricycle undercarriage powered by a 125 hp (93 kW) Lycoming O-290 engine, one built.
C.H.3 Series 2 Super Ace
145 hp (108 kW) de Havilland Gipsy Major 10 powered. Greater span, rudder bar provided. 18 flown.
C.H.3 Series 3 Skyjeep
Military A.O.P. and ambulance aircraft, essentially similar to the series 4.
C.H.3 Series 4 Skyjeep
conventional controls and tailwheel, 155 hp Blackburn Cirrus Major 3 powered. 3 flown.

== Survivors ==
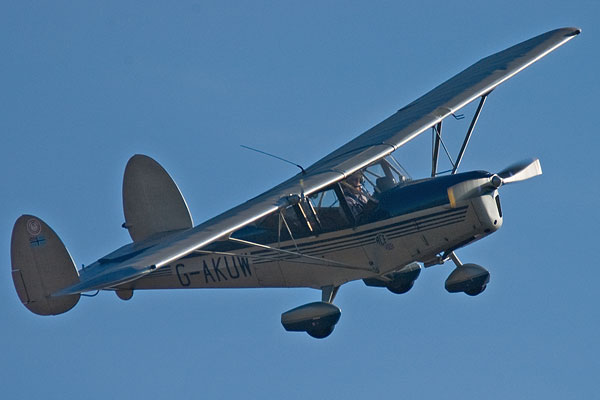
Chrislea CH3 Super Ace Series 2 G-AKUW, manufactured 1948

Recently there have been two flying Super Aces in the UK, G-AKVF and G-AKUW, plus a Skyjeep (G-AKVR).There is also a recently restored Super Ace ZK-ASI in Ashburton Aviation Museum, New Zealand

== Specifications (C.H.3 Series 4) ==
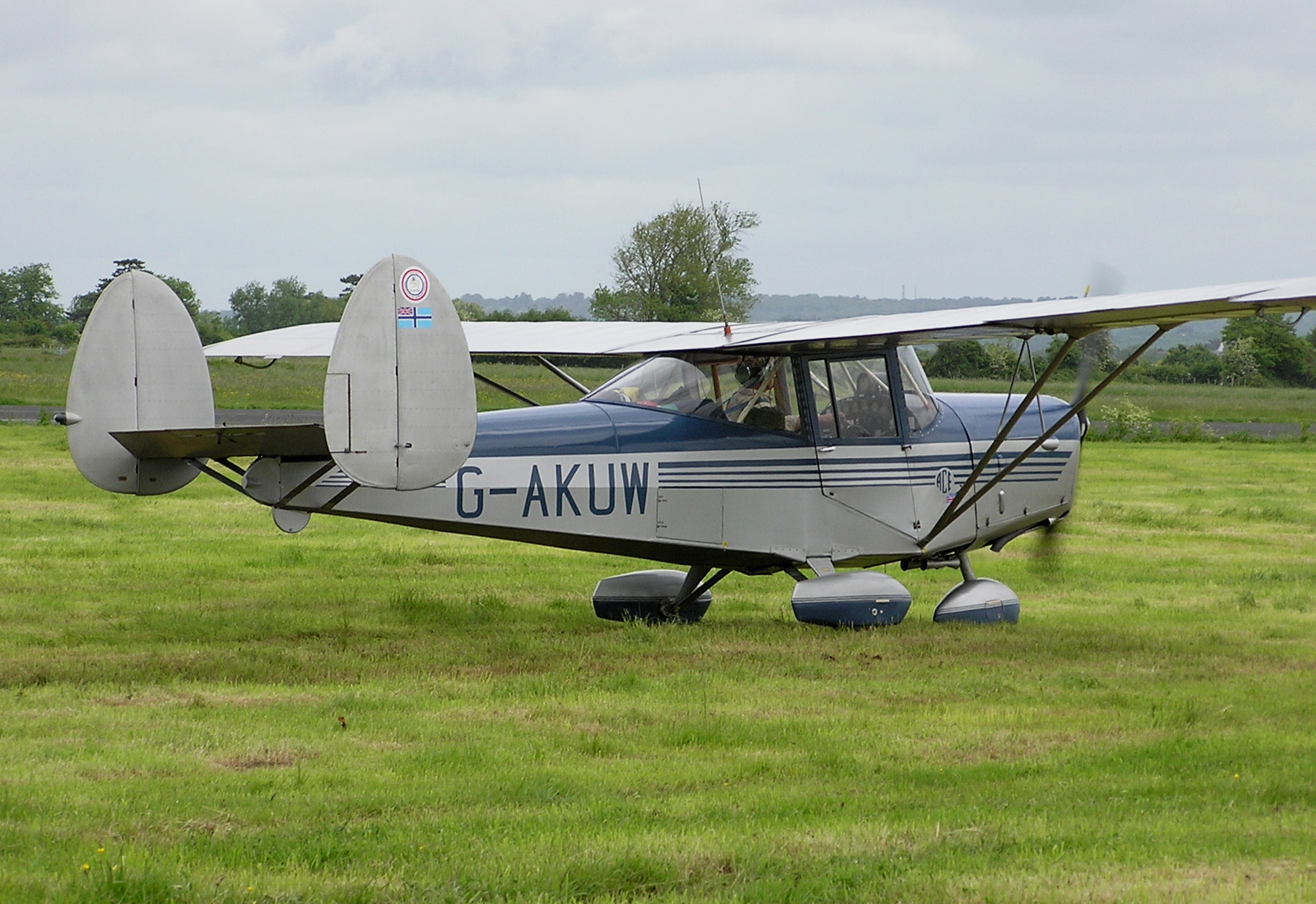
Another view of G-AKUW

Data from Jane's all the World's Aircraft 1949-50, British Civil Aircraft since 1919 Volume 2

General characteristics

- Crew: 1
- Capacity: up to 3 pax with up to 82 lb (37 kg) baggage
- Length: 21 ft 6 in (6.55 m)
- Wingspan: 36 ft 0 in (10.97 m)
- Height: 7 ft 3 in (2.21 m)
- Wing area: 177 sq ft (16.4 m^{2})
- Airfoil: NACA 23012
- Empty weight: 1,426 lb (647 kg)
- Max takeoff weight: 2,400 lb (1,089 kg)
- Fuel capacity: 35 imp gal (42 US gal; 160 L)
- Powerplant: 1 × de Havilland Gipsy Major 10 4-cylinder inverted air-cooled in-line piston engine, 145 hp (108 kW)
- Propellers: 2-bladed Weybridge wooden fixed pitch propeller, 6 ft 10 in (2.08 m) diameter

Performance

- Maximum speed: 126 mph (203 km/h, 109 kn) at 2,400 lb (1,100 kg) weight and 2,000 ft (610 m) altitude
- Cruise speed: 112 mph (180 km/h, 97 kn) economical cruise at 2,000 ft (610 m)
- Stall speed: 47 mph (76 km/h, 41 kn) flaps down
- Range: 400 mi (640 km, 350 nmi)
- Rate of climb: 750 ft/min (3.8 m/s)
- Take-off run to 50 ft (15 m): 250 yd (230 m)
- Landing run from 50 ft (15 m): 200 yd (180 m)

Avionics
Murphy VHF TxRx

== See also ==
- General Skyfarer
- General Aircraft Cygnet
