= PC-Flight Pretty Flight =

Type of ultralight aircraft

Pretty Flight
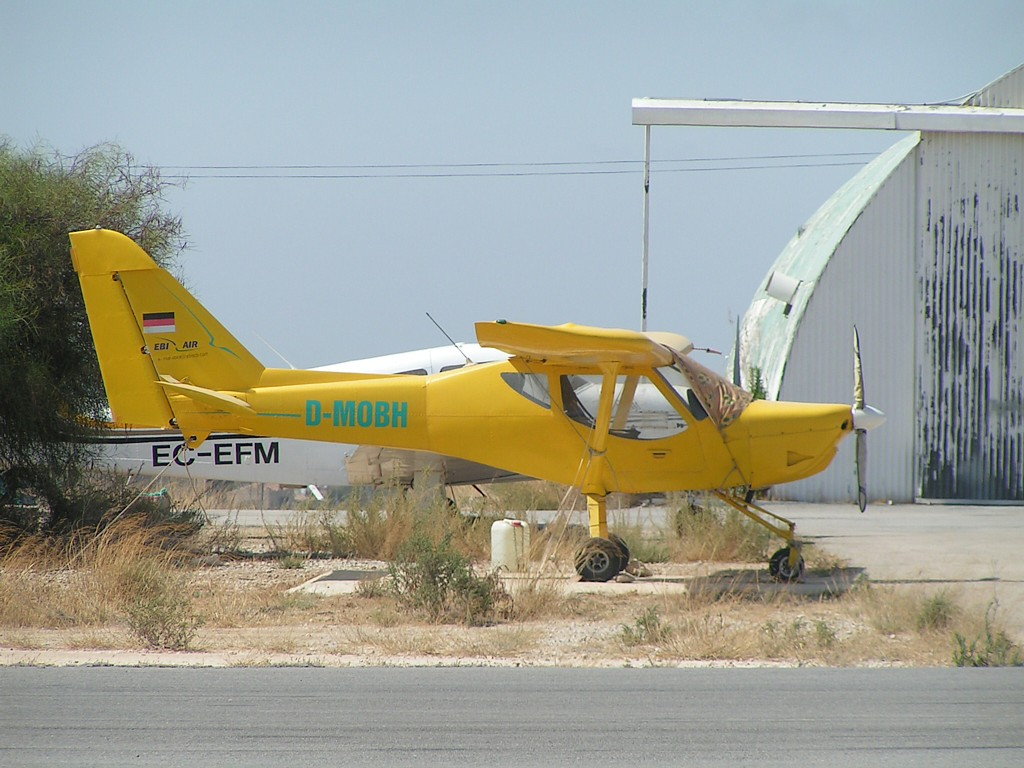

General information
- Type: Two-seat ultralight
- National origin: Germany
- Manufacturer: Original: PC-Flight; Present: GM&T International
- Designer: Calin Gologan
- Status: In production (2011)
- Number built: At least 5

History
- First flight: November 1996

The PC-Flight Pretty Flight is a single-engined, two-seat ultralight aircraft, designed in Germany and built in Romania in the 1990s. Few have been built.

In 2011 the aircraft was listed as back in production as the GM&T International Pretty Flight.

== Design and development ==
Production rights to the Pretty Flight have been held by several companies. It was designed by Calin Gologan and test flown by Peter Maderitch, whose first initials formed the original company name, PC-Flight. This company ceased trading in 2005 but reformed as PCH-Flugzeubau to continue marketing the design. Production rights went to PC-Aero in Germany but PC-Aero signed an agreement in 2002 with GM&T International of Romania giving them the right to produce the design.

The Pretty Flight is a conventionally laid out, high-wing monoplane of all-metal construction, fitted with a single engine and seating two in side by side. The wing is braced with a single, faired lift strut on either side. Its skin is mostly metal apart from the rear part of the wings and the control surfaces. The wing tips are upturned and the fin swept. The wing carries full span flaperons, later replaced with conventional ailerons and flaps. It has a horn-balanced rudder. The cabin seats two in side-by-side configuration. Its tricycle landing gear has cantilever spring main legs and a cantilever nose leg, with wheels in fairings. The Pretty Flight has a ballistic recovery parachute.

While it has been built with the Rotax 912iS 100 hp (75 kW) aircraft engine, in 2015 it was also advertised with the 75 hp (56 kW) Walter Mikron III.

The first flight was in November 1996. Pretty Flight parts were originally produced by Star Tech Impex of Romania and assembled by Nitsche Flugzeubau in Germany. One prototype, one production aircraft and three pre-series aircraft had been built when German certification was achieved in September 1998. A batch of ten production aircraft was established in November 1998 but later suspended at least until the rights change to GM&T; it is not known how many production Pretty Flights were completed. The GM&T demonstrator D-MNPF was the 1996 first prototype.

== Operational history ==
The GM&T aircraft was exhibited at AERO Friedrichshafen, in April 2005, but was not present in 2007. By mid-2010 there were 5 Pretty Flights on the German civil aviation register but none elsewhere in Europe.

== Specifications ==
Data from Jane's All the World's Aircraft 1999/2000

General characteristics

- Capacity: 2
- Length: 6.25 m (20 ft 6 in)
- Wingspan: 10.00 m (32 ft 10 in)
- Height: 2.57 m (8 ft 5 in)
- Wing area: 11.66 m^{2} (125.5 sq ft)
- Airfoil: GAW PC-1
- Empty weight: 270 kg (595 lb)
- Max takeoff weight: 450 kg (992 lb)
- Fuel capacity: 58 L (15.3 US gal, 12.8 Imp gal) standard
- Powerplant: 1 × Rotax 912UL flat four, 60 kW (80 hp)
- Propellers: 2-bladed fixed pitch

Performance

- Maximum speed: 210 km/h (130 mph, 110 kn)
- Cruise speed: 195 km/h (121 mph, 105 kn) at 75% power
- Stall speed: 63 km/h (39 mph, 34 kn)
- Range: 2,000 km (1,200 mi, 1,100 nmi) at 40% power
- Rate of climb: 5.6 m/s (1,100 ft/min) maximum, at sea level
