= Skandinaviska Aero BHT-1 Beauty =

1940s Swedish single-seat light monoplane

BHT-1 Beauty
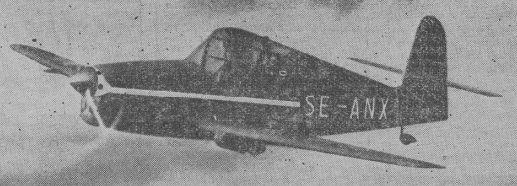

General information
- Type: Single-seat light monoplane
- National origin: Sweden
- Manufacturer: Skandinaviska Aero
- Designer: E. Bratt, K.E. Hilfing and B.Törnblom
- Number built: 1

History
- First flight: 4 December 1944

The Skandinaviska Aero BHT-1 Beauty is a 1940s Swedish single-seat light monoplane designed by E. Bratt, K.E. Hilfing and B.Törnblom and built by Skandinaviska Aero of Stockholm.

== Design ==
The BHT-1 is a wooden low-wing cantilever monoplane with a retractable tailwheel landing gear. Powered by a 60 hp (45 kW) Walter Mikron 4 piston engine it has an enclosed single-seat cockpit. The wings include slotted flaps.

== Variants ==
The BHT-2 was a proposed two-seat development. A prototype constant speed propeller was developed for the aircraft using differential between engine oil, and ram air pressure to control pitch.

== Specifications ==
Data from Jane's Fighting Aircraft of World War II, Jane's all the World's Aircraft 1947

General characteristics

- Crew: 1
- Length: 5.8 m (19 ft 0 in)
- Wingspan: 6.82 m (22 ft 5 in)
- Height: 1.9 m (6 ft 3 in)
- Wing area: 7 m^{2} (75 sq ft)
- Empty weight: 240 kg (529 lb)
- Gross weight: 365 kg (805 lb) aerobatic
- Max takeoff weight: 420 kg (926 lb) long-range
- Fuel capacity: 88 L (23 US gal; 19 imp gal) in three tanks, plus 127 L (34 US gal; 28 imp gal) in "special reserve" fuel tank
- Powerplant: 1 × Walter Mikron 4 4-cyl. inverted air-cooled in-line piston engine, 45 kW (60 hp)
- Propellers: 2-bladed wooden fixed-pitch airscrew with provision for controllable-pitch airscrew

Performance

- Maximum speed: 250 km/h (160 mph, 130 kn)
- Cruise speed: 210 km/h (130 mph, 110 kn) *Landing speed with flaps:75 km/h (47 mph; 40 kn)
- Never exceed speed: 580 km/h (360 mph, 310 kn) with controllable-pitch airscrew
- Range: 1,700 km (1,100 mi, 920 nmi)
- Ferry range: 3,000 km (1,900 mi, 1,600 nmi) with special reserve fuel tank
- Service ceiling: 7,500 m (24,600 ft)
- Rate of climb: 5.2 m/s (1,020 ft/min)
- Wing loading: 52 kg/m^{2} (11 lb/sq ft) aerobatic
- Power/mass: 8.18 kg/kW (13.42 lb/hp)
