= Chrislea Aircraft =

20th-century British aircraft manufacturer

Chrislea Aircraft Limited was a British aircraft manufacturer, formed in 1936 and closed in 1952.

== History ==
The company was formed on 2 October 1936 at Heston Aerodrome near London, England, to build the designs of Richard Christoforides. The company name was derived from the partners Christoforides and Bernard Victor Leak. The first product was the Airguard which first flew in 1938. The Ace first flew in 1946 and soon after in April 1947 the company moved to Exeter International Airport (due to the closure of Heston). At Exeter the Super Ace and Skyjeep were produced, but the aircraft did not sell well due to resistance to the unusual control wheel used. The managing director and chief designer R.C. Christoforides left the company after internal problems, reduced demand and low production levels, with the assets of the company being bought by C.E.Harper Aircraft Limited in 1952, which scrapped all partly constructed and non-flown aircraft (Seven Super Aces and two Skyjeeps).

== Aircraft designs ==
- Chrislea Airguard
- Chrislea Ace
- Chrislea Super Ace
- Chrislea Skyjeep
