= Podesva Trener =

Czech ultralight aircraft

Trener

General information
- Type: Ultralight aircraft
- National origin: Czech Republic
- Manufacturer: Podesva Air
- Designer: Tomas Podesva
- Status: Production completed

History
- Developed from: Zlin 126

The Podesva Trener (English: Trainer), also called the Trener Baby, is a Czech ultralight aircraft that was designed by Tomas Podesva and produced by Podesva Air of Uničov. The aircraft a faithful 80% scale reproduction of the Zlin 126 and is supplied as plans, as a kit for amateur construction or as a complete ready-to-fly-aircraft.

By April 2018 the company website had been taken down and the aircraft seems to be out of production.

== Design and development ==
Podesva designs and builds reproductions of famous aircraft on a custom basis for customers. The Trener was designed to comply with the Fédération Aéronautique Internationale microlight rules. It features a cantilever low-wing, a two-seats-in-tandem enclosed cockpit under a framed canopy, fixed conventional landing gear and a single engine in tractor configuration.

The aircraft fuselage is made from welded steel tubing, with the wings made from aluminum sheet. Its 8.68 m (28.5 ft) span wing has an area of 10.8 m^{2} (116 sq ft) and flaps. The standard engine available is the 75 hp (56 kW) Walter Mikron IIIb four cylinder, four-stroke powerplant.

== Operational history ==
Reviewer Marino Boric described the design in a 2015 review as "a faithful reproduction of the classic aerobatic Zlin 126 aircraft, down to the last detail...The handling of this two-seater is impressive."

== Specifications (Trener) ==
Data from Bayerl

General characteristics

- Crew: one
- Capacity: one passenger
- Wingspan: 8.68 m (28 ft 6 in)
- Wing area: 10.8 m^{2} (116 sq ft)
- Empty weight: 296 kg (653 lb)
- Gross weight: 472.5 kg (1,042 lb)
- Fuel capacity: 80 litres (18 imp gal; 21 US gal) in two 40 litres (8.8 imp gal; 11 US gal) tanks
- Powerplant: 1 × Walter Mikron IIIb four cylinder, air-cooled, four stroke aircraft engine, 56 kW (75 hp)
- Propellers: 2-bladed wooden

Performance

- Maximum speed: 220 km/h (140 mph, 120 kn)
- Cruise speed: 175 km/h (109 mph, 94 kn)
- Stall speed: 65 km/h (40 mph, 35 kn)
- Rate of climb: 4 m/s (790 ft/min)
- Wing loading: 43.8 kg/m^{2} (9.0 lb/sq ft)
