= Utva Trojka =

Yugoslav light aircraft

C-3 Trojka
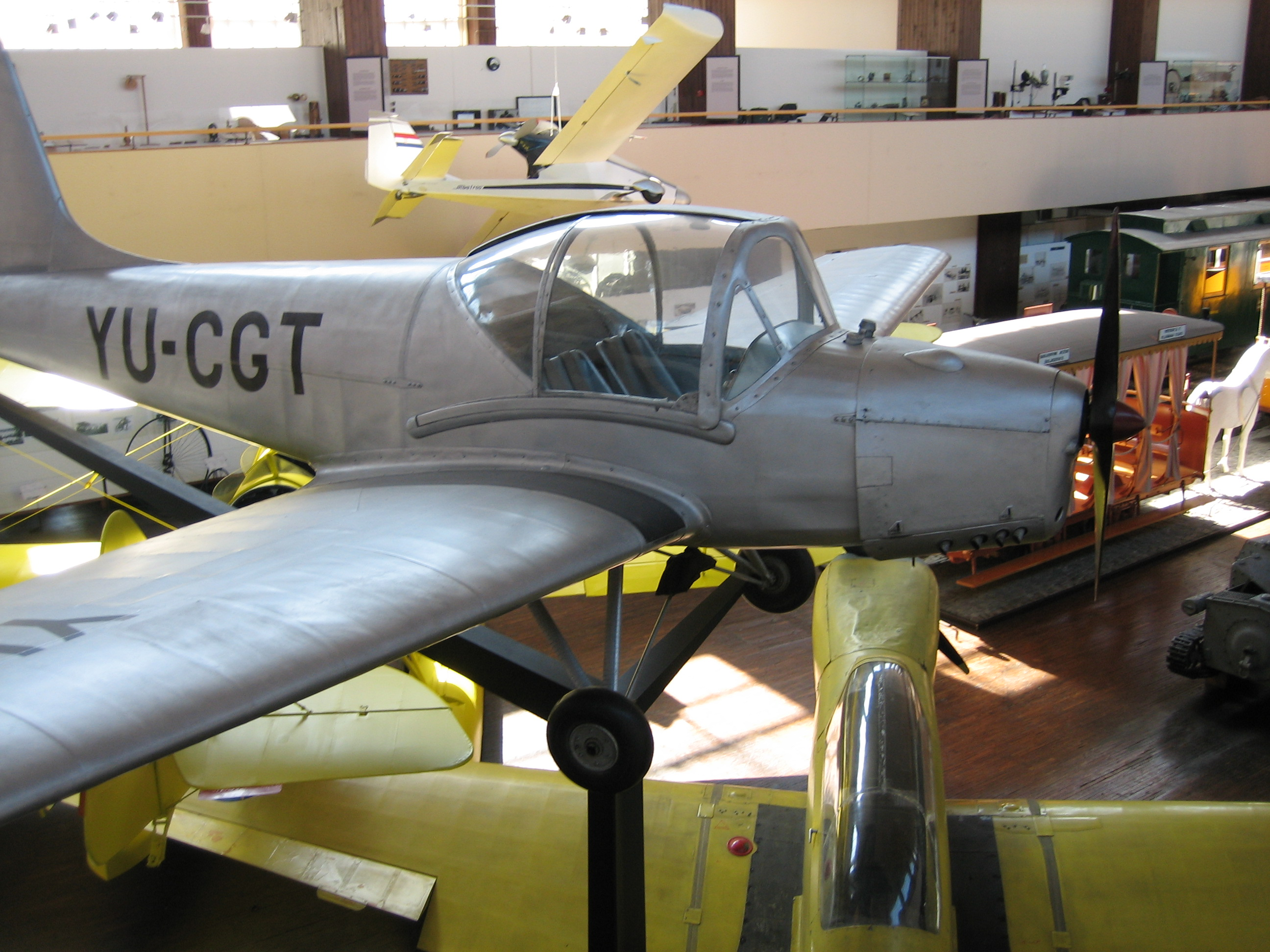
- An Utva Trojka on display at the Technical Museum in Zagreb

General information
- Type: Civil trainer
- National origin: Yugoslavia
- Manufacturer: Ikarus, Utva
- Number built: ca.80

History
- First flight: 1946

The Utva C-3 Trojka (Trey) was a light aircraft built in Yugoslavia shortly after World War II as a result of a government competition to develop a new, domestically built aircraft with which to equip the country's flying clubs. The winning design was submitted by Boris Cijan and Djordje T. Petković and the prototype was built by Ikarus as the Ikarus 251. Series production took place at Utva as the C-3. It was a conventional, low-wing cantilever monoplane with fixed tailwheel undercarriage. The pilot and instructor sat side by side under an expansive canopy. The type remained in production until the mid-1950s with later examples powered by the more powerful Walter Mikron 4.

== Operators ==
Yugoslavia

- Yugoslav Air Force
- Letalski center Maribor

== Specifications ==
General characteristics

- Crew: Two, pilot and instructor
- Length: 8.84 m (29 ft 0 in)
- Wingspan: 10.49 m (34 ft 5 in)
- Height: 2.08 m (6 ft 10 in)
- Wing area: 15.5 m^{2} (16.7 sq ft)
- Empty weight: 374 kg (824 lb)
- Gross weight: 602 kg (1,328 lb)
- Powerplant: 1 × Walter Mikron III , 49 kW (65 hp)

Performance

- Maximum speed: 166 km/h (103 mph, 90 kn)
- Range: 605 km (376 mi, 327 nmi)
- Service ceiling: 3,900 m (12,800 ft)

== See also ==
Aircraft of comparable role, configuration, and era

- LWD Żak
- Zlin Z-22 Junak
- Yakovlev Yak-20
