= Lemberger LD20b =

General information
- Type: Sport biplane
- National origin: West Germany
- Designer: Karl Lemberger
- Status: Experimental
- Number built: 1

History
- First flight: 1971 or 1972

The Lemberger LD20b was a single-engine cantilever biplane designed to be easily towable behind a car. Built in Germany in 1971, it made several flights but did not enter production.

== Design and development ==
One of the main reasons for the popularity of the biplane in the early days of aviation was the wing strength provided by this arrangement. The two wings, without interplane struts and flying wires form a strong structure. Thus cantilever biplane wings are quite rare, though they do provide extra wing area for a given span and for the easy separation of wings from each other and from the fuselage. The Lemberger LD20b was one of this kind, designed with readily detachable wings and a tailplane so that it could be towed by a car. Whilst towing, the wings were stowed alongside the fuselage. The tailskid was linked to the car via a luggage rack-like frame.

The upper and lower wings of the LD20b were very similar, with the same span, area and straight, near-constant chord, plan. The lower wings were attached to the lower fuselage longerons and the upper ones to cabine struts above the front of the cabin. They were arranged with considerable stagger. The wings were built around two closely spaced spars, with plywood skin from the rear spar forward forming a torsion box and fabric covering behind. Differential ailerons were mounted only on the lower wings.

The wooden, rectangular fuselage is plywood-covered to just behind the pilot's seat and fabric-covered further aft apart from a curved plywood decking behind the cabin. The fin was integral with the fuselage and unusually shallow with the variable incidence tailplane mounted on top of it, a little above the fuselage and bearing damped elevators. The balanced rudder was much taller than the fin. The enclosed cabin seated two in tandem with the front seat under the upper wing and over the centre of gravity. Dual control was fitted. In front, a Walter 60 hp Mikron inverted 4-cylinder engine drove a two-bladed propeller.

== Operational history ==
The LD20b was completed in 1971. Its first flights were made from EDSZ Rottweil-Zepfenhahn,(Germany), piloted by a Me 109 pilot. The next flight from Friedrichshafen, Germany, piloted by Arnold Wagner, an airline pilot, the Swiss aerobatic champion and designer of the Hirth Acrostar.

After its presentation at Friedrichshafen, Leonhard Kurt Kienlein took over ownership, which he retains, and the task of making the structural changes in order to make sure the plane did reach stable flight characteristics. He also maintained the aircraft. An enclosed, all-weather trailer was built to house the LD20. The last flight after a total of 368 hours was in 1998.

Later, Lemberger abandoned plans to build a high-wing monoplane of his own design after failing to find suitable construction space.

== Specifications ==
Data from Jane's All the World's Aircraft 1973-74

General characteristics

- Capacity: 2
- Length: 6.67 m (21 ft 11 in)
- Wingspan: 7.28 m (23 ft 11 in)
- Height: 2.20 m (7 ft 3 in)
- Wing area: 14.00 m^{2} (150.7 sq ft) gross
- Empty weight: 300 kg (661 lb)
- Max takeoff weight: 538 kg (1,186 lb)
- Powerplant: 1 × Walter Mikron 4-cylinder inverted air cooled, 46 kW (62 hp) 60 hp
- Propellers: 2-bladed

Performance

- Maximum speed: 178 km/h (111 mph, 96 kn) at maximum take-off weight. Estimated, as are the other performance figures.
- Cruise speed: 120 km/h (75 mph, 65 kn)
- Stall speed: 45 km/h (28 mph, 24 kn)
- Never exceed speed: 240 km/h (150 mph, 130 kn)
- Minimum control speed: 55 km/h (34 mph, 30 kn)
- Ferry range: 360 km (220 mi, 190 nmi)
- Service ceiling: 3,800 m (12,500 ft)
- Time to altitude: 1,000 m (3275 ft) in 7 mins
