= RWD 21 =

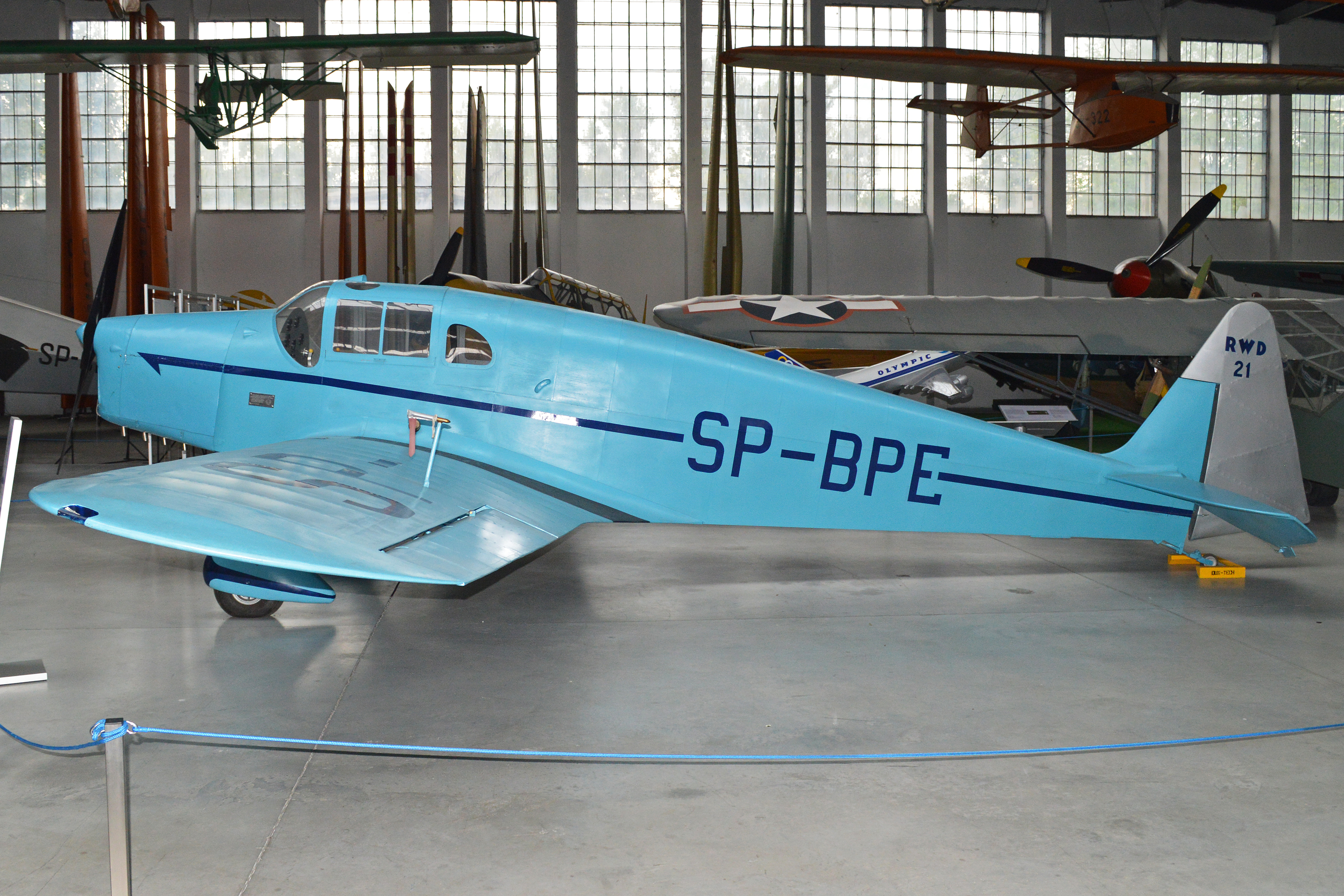
- RWD 21 in the Polish Aviation Museum

General information
- Type: Touring and sports plane
- National origin: Poland
- Manufacturer: DWL
- Designer: RWD bureau
- Primary user: Poland
- Number built: >2 RWD 16bis >6 RWD 21

History
- Manufactured: 1938-1939
- Introduction date: 1938
- First flight: 1938 (RWD 16bis)
- Retired: 1950
- Developed from: RWD 16

The RWD 16bis and RWD 21 were Polish two-seat low-wing touring and sports planes of the late 1930s, constructed by the RWD bureau, sharing the same construction, main difference of the RWD 21 being a stronger engine.

== Development ==
The RWD 16bis was designed in 1938 by Andrzej Anczutin of the RWD bureau as a light and economical touring and sports plane, utilizing the experience from an unsuccessful earlier design RWD 16. In spite of the designation, the RWD 16bis design was new, only partly basing on the RWD 16 construction. On contrary, it appeared a successful design, with good handling and performance and ease of flying. It was a wooden low-wing monoplane, with two seats side-by-side in a closed cockpit.

The first prototype was built and first flown in June–July 1938 (registration SP-BNM) followed by the second prototype (SP-BPC). Both were powered by a Polish-designed 63 hp Avia 3 straight engine. In series, a 62 hp Walter Mikron II straight engine was expected. The LOPP paramilitary organization ordered 20 aircraft, the first were to be built by May 1939. Probably a few were completed by the outbreak of the World War II, but there are no evidences.

The RWD 21 was a development variant with a stronger 90 hp engine Cirrus Minor and some minor changes, mostly to a canopy. The prototype was flown in February 1939 (registration SP-BPE). The first series of 10 aircraft was ordered and at least six were completed and registered before the war outbreak (SP-BRE, BRF, BRG, BRH, BRM, KAR)

== Operational history ==
Both aircraft were found by the LOPP paramilitary organization as successful economical planes, suitable for the plan of subsidising the development of private aviation in Poland. A series of RWD 16bis was ordered by the LOPP at a price of 17,800 złoty (including the engine 6,200 zł), in order to sell airframes to private owners for 9,500 zł (the price of a mid-class car), lending them engines. The price of the RWD 21 was 20,500 zł (including the engine 8,000 zł).

At the outbreak of World War II, one RWD 21 was owned by Wilno Aero Club (SP-BRF), three by the LOPP (SP-BRE, BRG, BRH), one by private owner (SP-KAR) and two remained in the factory (SP-BPE, BRM). After the German invasion on Poland, in September 1939, two RWD 21s (SP-BPE and BRM) were evacuated from the factory to Romania (one of them by a glider pilot Bronisław Żurakowski, who had not flown a plane before). At least one of them (SP-BPE) was used in Romania with markings YR-VEN and returned to Poland after the war. It was next used until the mid-1950s with new markings SP-AKG. It is currently restored and preserved in the Polish Aviation Museum in Kraków.

One RWD 21 was evacuated to Latvia, its further fate is unknown.

== Description ==
Wooden construction low-wing cantilever monoplane, conventional in layout, with a fixed landing gear and a closed cockpit. Fuselage semi-monocoque, plywood-covered, duralumin in front engine section. Single-part trapezoid wings with rounded tips, two-spar, plywood (in front) and canvas covered, fitted with split flaps. Conventional cantilever empennage, plywood (fins) and canvas (elevators and rudder) covered. Two seats side-by-side, with twin controls, under a canopy, with a fixed windshield. Behind a cockpit, a place for a baggage. Conventional fixed landing gear with a rear skid, the main gear in covers. 4-cylinder straight engine in front, driving a two-blade fixed pitch Szomański wooden propeller, with a 73 L (19 US gal; 16 imp gal) fuel tank in the centre-section, under the crew seats.

== Operators ==
Poland
Romania

- Royal Romanian Air Force

== Specifications (RWD-21) ==
Data from Polish aircraft 1893-1939, Polskie konstrukcje lotnicze 1893–1939

General characteristics

- Crew: 1
- Capacity: 1
- Length: 8.4 m (27 ft 7 in)
- Wingspan: 11 m (36 ft 1 in)
- Height: 2.12 m (6 ft 11 in)
- Wing area: 14.95 m^{2} (160.9 sq ft)
- Airfoil: root: Warsaw Aerodynamic Institute 16%; tip: Warsaw Aerodynamic Institute 10%;
- Empty weight: 425 kg (937 lb)
- Gross weight: 660 kg (1,455 lb)
- Max takeoff weight: 685 kg (1,510 lb)
- Fuel capacity: 73 L (19 US gal; 16 imp gal) in a centre-section tank; 7 L (1.8 US gal; 1.5 imp gal) oil
- Powerplant: 1 × Blackburn Cirrus Minor 4-cylinder air-cooledinverted in-line piston engine, 67 kW (90 hp)
- Propellers: 2-bladed Szomański fixed-pitch propeller

Performance

- Maximum speed: 210 km/h (130 mph, 110 kn) at sea level
- Cruise speed: 175 km/h (109 mph, 94 kn)
- Stall speed: 72 km/h (45 mph, 39 kn)
- Range: 600 km (370 mi, 320 nmi)
- Service ceiling: 5,500 m (18,000 ft)
- Time to altitude: 1,000 m (3,300 ft) in 4 minutes 30 seconds
- Wing loading: 44.1 kg/m^{2} (9.0 lb/sq ft)
- Power/mass: 0.1021 kW/kg (0.0621 hp/lb)

== See also ==
Aircraft of comparable role, configuration, and era

- Bücker Bü 181
- LWD Żak
