= Parma Mikron III UL =

Mikron III UL
- Type: Aircraft engine
- National origin: Czech Republic
- Manufacturer: Parma Technik sro

The Parma Mikron III UL is a Czech aircraft engine, developed from the Walter Mikron and produced by Parma Technik sro of Luhačovice for use in ultralight aircraft.

== Design and development ==
The Mikron III UL is a four-cylinder four-stroke, in-line, 2,440 cc (148.9 cu in) displacement, air-cooled, direct-drive, gasoline engine design. It employs dual magnetos and produces 75 hp (56 kW) at 2760 rpm, with a compression ratio of 7.0:1.

== Specifications (Mikron III UL) ==
Data from Tacke

=== General characteristics ===
- Type: Four-cylinder, four-stroke aircraft engine
- Bore: 90 mm (3.5 in)
- Stroke: 96 mm (3.8 in)
- Displacement: 2,440 cc (148.9 cu in)
- Dry weight: 72 kg (158.7 lb)

=== Components ===
- Fuel type: gasoline
- Cooling system: air
- Reduction gear: none

=== Performance ===
- Power output: 75 hp (56 kW)

== See also ==
Related development

- Walter Mikron

Related lists

- List of aircraft engines
