= Chrislea Airguard =

Airguard
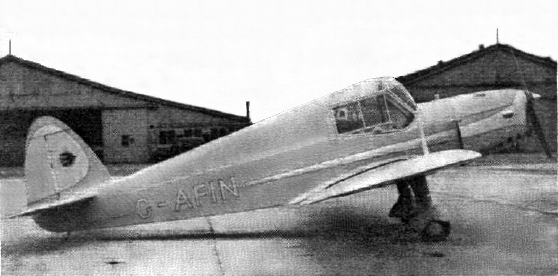
- Chrislea Airguard (G-AFIN), Heston 1939

General information
- Type: Cabin monoplane
- National origin: United Kingdom
- Manufacturer: Chrislea Aircraft Limited
- Designer: R.C. Christophorides and B V Leak
- Number built: 1

History
- First flight: 1938

The Chrislea L.C.1 Airguard is a 1930s British two-seat cabin monoplane, designed by R.C. Christophorides and B V Leak, and built by Chrislea Aircraft Limited at Heston Aerodrome.

== Development ==
The Airguard was designed as a training aircraft for the Civil Air Guard; it was a two-seat (side-by-side) low-wing cantilever monoplane, powered by a 62 hp Walter Mikron II inline piston engine.

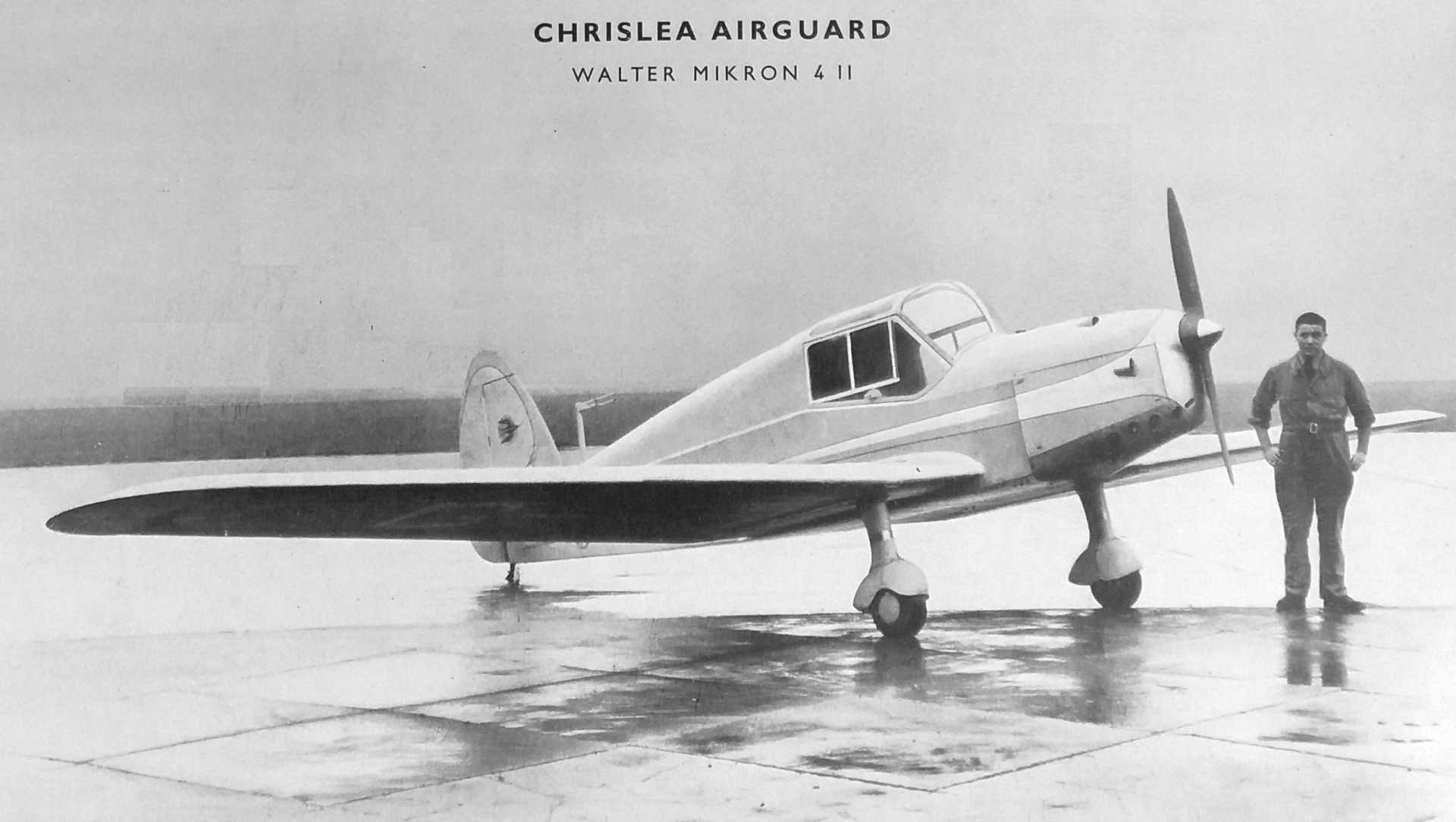
Walter Mikron II and Chrislea L.C.1 Airguard (1938)

== Operational history ==
It was built in 1938, and registered G-AFIN After a time in private ownership, it was withdrawn from use and stored until the 1970s. It was re-built with a new fuselage, but it remains in private storage (2006), not having flown since World War II.

== Specifications ==
Data from Jackson, 1973, p. 289

General characteristics

- Crew: 1
- Capacity: 1
- Length: 21 ft 5 in (6.53 m)
- Wingspan: 35 ft 9 in (10.90 m)
- Height: 6 ft 3 in (1.91 m)
- Wing area: 157 sq ft (14.6 m^{2})
- Empty weight: 812 lb (368 kg)
- Gross weight: 1,300 lb (590 kg)
- Powerplant: 1 × Walter Mikron II , 62 hp (46 kW)

Performance

- Maximum speed: 118 mph (190 km/h, 103 kn)
- Cruise speed: 104 mph (167 km/h, 90 kn)
- Stall speed: 48 mph (77 km/h, 42 kn) (flaps down)
- Range: 375 mi (604 km, 326 nmi)
- Service ceiling: 17,000 ft (5,200 m) (absolute)
- Rate of climb: 550 ft/min (2.8 m/s)
