= Mikron Holding =

Swiss machining and assembly systems company

Mikron Holding AG
- Formerly: Mikron AG
- Company type: Joint-stock company
- ISIN: CH0003390066
- Industry: Machining and assembly systems
- Founded: 1908 in Biel/Bienne, Switzerland
- Founder: Karl Lüthy
- Headquarters: Biel/Bienne, Switzerland
- Products: Machining and assembly systems, transfer machines, milling machines, injection molds
- Revenue: SFr 374.1 million (2024)
- Number of employees: 1,588 (2024)
- Website: mikron.com

Mikron Holding is a Swiss company based in Biel/Bienne specializing in machining and assembly systems.

== History ==
Founded in 1908 by Karl Lüthy, the machine factory Mikron AG initially produced toolmaking lathes, hobbing machines, machines for shaping small gears, and other machines for the watchmaking industry. Under the direction of Christian Gasser, Mikron Holding AG (from 1961) expanded its production to transfer machines in 1962 after acquiring the firm Haesler SA at Boudry, and from the mid-1960s began manufacturing universal milling machines and milling cutters. The company later produced molds for plastic injection molding, synthetic gears, and assembly installations.

Active worldwide and listed on the stock exchange since 1983, the company took over Albe SA at Agno in 1986 (transfer machines for the ballpoint pen industry). Under the name Mikron Technology Group (1997), it acquired further companies from 1999 but sold its milling-machine production division in 2000. In 2001 the company went through a crisis from which it recovered in mid-2003, thanks to a group of investors led by Johann Niklaus Schneider-Ammann.

In 2024 Mikron reported revenue of 374.1 million francs (122.3 in 2007) and employed 1,588 people (1,008 in 2007, 3435 in 2000, 867 in 1970). That year the group expanded through the acquisition of DM2 in Italy and of the software platform LYSR, and announced an expansion of its production facilities at Boudry.

== Bibliography ==
- Mikron Hauszeitung, 8, 1968, 2–7; 46, 1986, 4–5
- Mikron-Journal, 50, 1988, 7, 10, 13
- NZZ, 9 August 2000; 27 May 2003
- Der Bund, 25 July 2007
- Précision à haute cadence – Fast-Paced Precision, 2008
