= Walter Mikron =

1930s Czech piston aircraft engine

Mikron
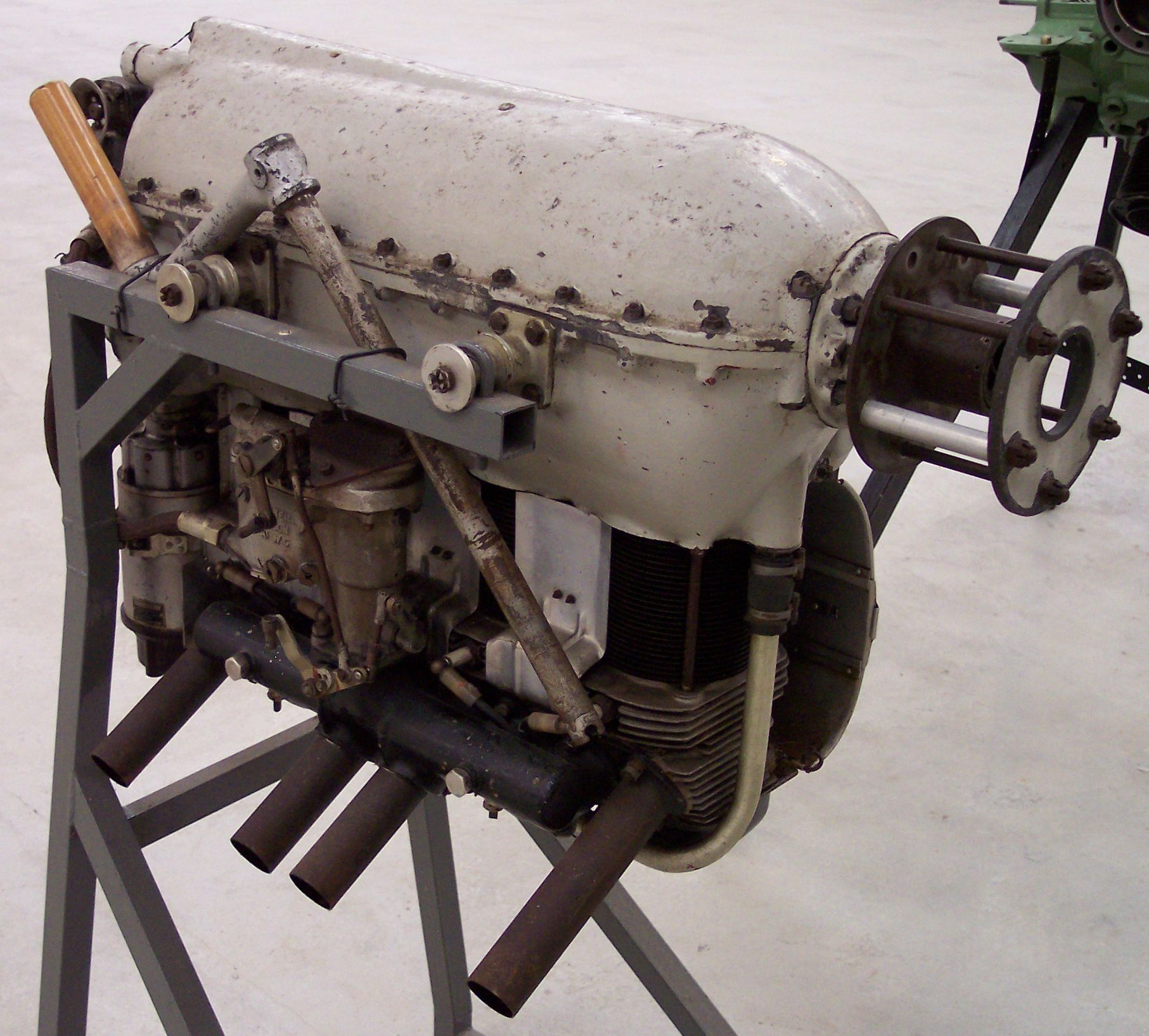
- Walter Mikron III
- Type: Inline piston engine
- National origin: Czechoslovakia
- Manufacturer: Walter Aircraft Engines / Parma Technik
- First run: 1938

The Walter Mikron is a four-cylinder, air-cooled, inverted straight engine for aircraft.

== Development ==
Developed in Czechoslovakia in the early 1930s, the engine saw limited use in late 1930s and early 1950s. In the 1980s an initial batch of engines was rebuilt by Aerotechnik Moravska Trebova for use on L-13 Vivat motorgliders. Production of new engines followed. The company Aerotechnik was later bought by Parma Technik and production resumed in 1999, under a new name, in the same factory. The engine is mostly used on ultralight, LSA and experimental aircraft. The production is about 20-30 engines annually. (2014)

== Variants ==
Mikron I

Initial production engines 37 kW (50 hp). 16 engines made in 1935.

Mikron II

The Mikron II, released in 1936, had a bore of 88 mm (3.46 in) and displacement of 2.336 L (142.55 cu in), delivering 45 kW (60 hp) at 2,600 rpm max continuous and 46 kW (62 hp) at 2,800 rpm for short periods. After a hiatus in production during the Second World War, production resumed till 1948, when the Micron III went into production. In total 421 Mikron II engines were produced.

Mikron III

With a displacement of 2.44 L (148.90 cu in), compression ratio 6:1, it produces 48.5 kW (65.0 hp) at 2,600 rpm. Introduced in 1945, 103 engines made between 1948-1950. The engines were used on Praga E-114 Air Baby.

Mikron IIIS

In 1980s company Aerotechnik in Moravska Trebova had collected 56 engines of the post war production. The engines have been rebuilt, new pistons and carburetor JIKOV SOP 40L installed. Used on L-13 Vivat motorgliders.

Mikron IIIA

Engines produced by Aerotechnik in 1980s-90s. Updated cylinder head with one more cooling rib, updated connecting rod lower end, otherwise identical with IIIS.

Mikron IIIB

Improved version of the Mikron IIIA 56 kW (75 hp) at 2,750rpm for 5 minutes, max continuous power of 51 kW (69 hp) from 2.44 L (148.90 cu in), compression ratio 7.2:1, bore 90 mm (3.54 in), stroke 96 mm (3.78 in), dry weight 69 kg (152.12 lb) Almost identical with IIIA except the compression ratio. The engine initially used lowered A heads. After some problems with cracking, new B heads were developed by Parma Technik.

Mikron M IIISE, AE, BE

Engines equipped with electric starter and alternator.

Mikron IIIC

60 kW (80 hp) at 2,800rpm from 2.7 L (164.76 cu in), bore 93.3 mm (3.67 in), stroke 96 mm (3.78 in). Version developed by Parma Technik for ULL and experimental aeroplanes.

== Applications ==
- Aerolab LoCamp
- Avia BH-1 replica
- Alaparma Baldo
- Avions Fairey Belfair
- Avions Fairey Junior
- B&F Fk131 Bücker Jungmann
- Bücker Bü 180
- Chrislea Airguard
- Currie Wot
- GM&T International Pretty Flight
- Gribovsky G-10
- Gribovsky G-22
- Isaacs Fury
- Jodel D11
- Johansen CAJO 59
- Koolhoven F.K.53
- L-13 SE Vivat
- L-13 SW Vivat
- Lemberger LD20b
- Luton Major
- LWD Żak
- Praga E.114
- Podesva Trener
- RWD-16
- RWD-21
- RWD-23
- Rogožarski SIM-VI
- Rogožarski SIM-VIa
- Skandinaviska Aero BHT-1 Beauty
- Tipsy B
- Utva Trojka
- Zlín Z-XII

== Specifications (Mikron II) ==
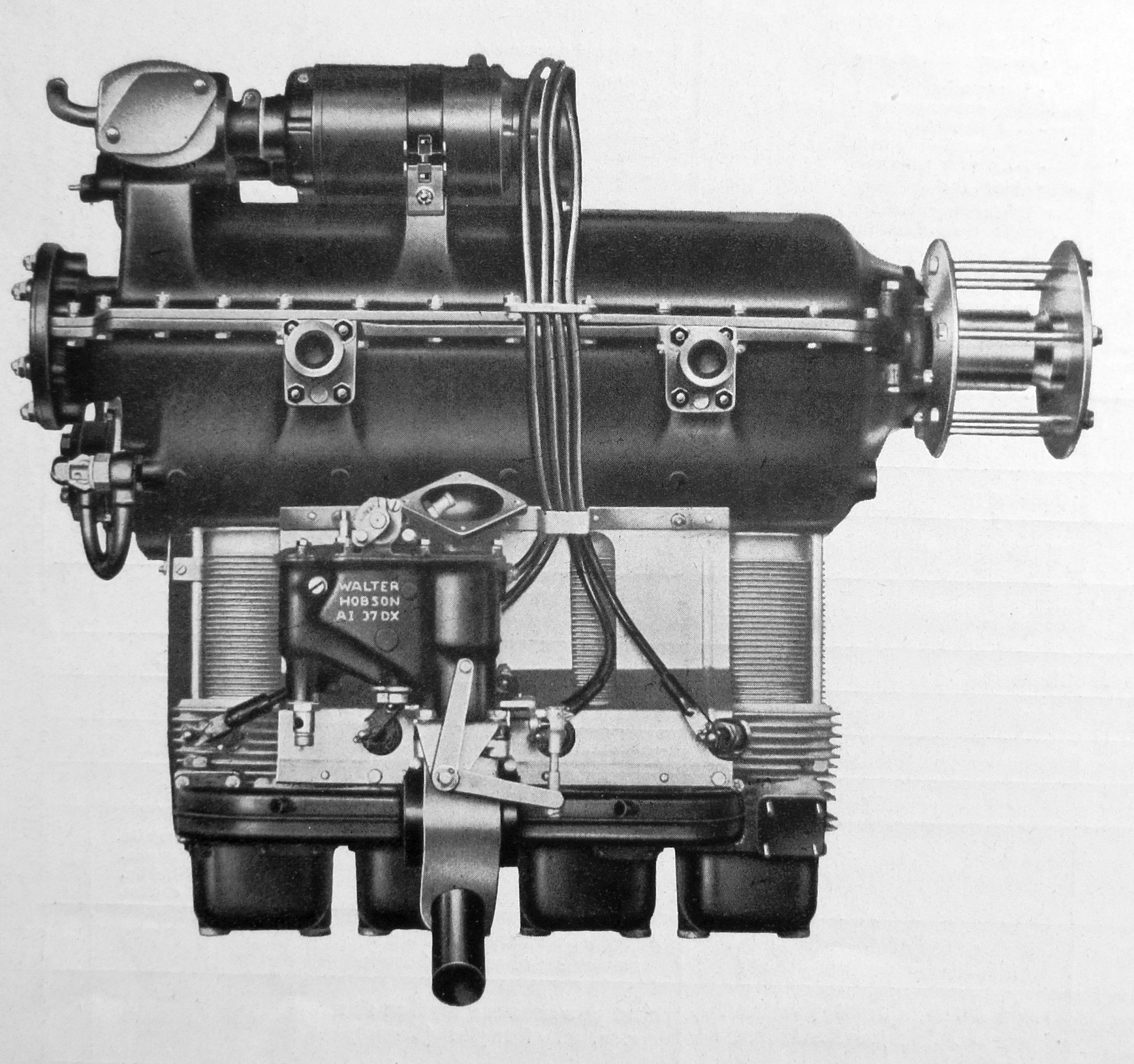

Data from Jane's All the World's Aircraft 1938.

=== General characteristics ===
- Type: 4-cylinder inverted air-cooled inline
- Bore: 88 mm (3.46 in)
- Stroke: 96 mm (3.78 in)
- Displacement: 2.336 L (142.6 cu in)
- Length: 804 mm (31.65 in) with starter
- Width: 342 mm (13.46 in) with fuel pump
- Height: 635 mm (25.00 in) with fuel pump
- Dry weight: 61 kg (134.48 lb) dry

=== Components ===
- Valvetrain: One intake and one exhaust valve per cylinder operated by pushrods and rockers
- Fuel system: 1 Claudel-Hobson carburettor
- Fuel type: 73 octane gasoline
- Oil system: Pressure fed, dry sump
- Cooling system: Air-cooled
- Starter: 1x Walter mecano 4 hand starter

=== Performance ===
- Power output: 45 kW (60 hp) at 2,600 rpm continuous, 46 kW (62 hp) at 2,800 rpm maximum for short periods
- Compression ratio: 6:1
- Power-to-weight ratio: 0.8 kW/kg (0.5 hp/lb)

== See also ==
- Parma Mikron III UL

Comparable engines

- Blackburn Cirrus Midget
- de Havilland Gipsy Minor
- ERCO I-L 116

Related lists

- List of aircraft engines
