= Possession =

Possession may refer to:

== Law ==
- Dependent territory, an area of land over which another country exercises sovereignty, but which does not have the full right of participation in that country's governance
- Drug possession, a crime
- Ownership
- Personal property, physical possessions belonging to a person
- Possession (law), practical control of a thing, in the context of the legal implications of that control
- Title (property)

== Linguistics ==
- Inalienable possession, relationship between two objects that is irreversible
- Possession (linguistics), grammatically expressed relationship such as control-of and ownership

== Supernatural possession ==
- Spirit possession, psychokinetic control of the behavior of a living thing or natural object by a spiritual being. Also psychokinetic control of a person by the Devil or other malevolent spirit.

== Places ==
- La Possession, French commune on the Indian Ocean island of Réunion
- Possession Island (disambiguation), various islands including a French island in the Indian Ocean and other three islands
- Possession Point, former land form, Hong Kong
- Possession Sound, Washington state
- Possession Street, Hong Kong

== Arts and entertainment ==
=== Literature ===
- Possession (Byatt novel), a 1990 novel by A. S. Byatt
- Possession (Johnson novel), a trilogy released from 2011 to 2014 by Elana Johnson
- Possession (Markandaya novel), a 1963 novel by Kamala Markandaya
- Possession (play), a play by Lyle Kessler
- The Possession, a 2002 novel by Annie Ernaux

=== Film and television ===
==== Film ====
- Possession (1919 film), a British silent romance
- Possession (1922 film), a British-French silent drama
- Possession (1981 film), a horror film starring Sam Neill, Isabelle Adjani and directed by Andrzej Żuławski
- Possession (2002 film), an adaptation of the A. S. Byatt novel, starring Aaron Eckhart and Gwyneth Paltrow
- Possession (2009 film), starring Sarah Michelle Gellar and Lee Pace
- Possession (2027 film), an American remake of the 1981 film, starring Margaret Qualley, Callum Turner, and directed by Parker Finn
- The Possession, a 2012 horror film starring Natasha Calis, Jeffrey Dean Morgan, Matisyahu and Kyra Sedgwick
- Dr. Cheon and Lost Talisman (working title Possession), a 2023 South Korean mystery thriller
- Possessor (film), a 2020 thriller film by Brandon Cronenberg
- Possession: Kerasukan, a 2024 Indonesian horror film

==== Television ====
- Possession (TV series), a 1985 Australian soap opera
- Possession (British TV series), a 2026 British thriller television series
- Ninjago: Possession, the fifth season of Ninjago: Masters of Spinjitzu
- "Possession" (Barney Miller), a 1981 episode
- "Possession" (Beast Wars), a 1997 episode
- "Possession" (Hit the Floor), a 2016 episode
- "Possession" (Instant Star), a 2008 episode
- "Possessions" (Chancer), a 1990 episode
- "The Possession" (The Amazing World of Gumball), a 2019 episode

=== Music ===
==== Albums ====
- Possession (Benea Reach album), 2013
- Possession (God album), 1992
- Possession (Joywave album) or the title song, 2020
- Possession (Lily Afshar album), 2002
- Possession (Ty Segall album), 2025

==== Songs ====
- "Possession" (Kuuro song), 2017
- "Possession" (Sarah McLachlan song), 1993
- "Possession" (Melanie Martinez song), 2026
- "Possession"/"My All for You", by Jyongri, 2006
- "Possession", by Bad English from Bad English, 1989
- "Possession", by Elvis Costello from Get Happy!!, 1980
- "Possession", by Danzig from Danzig, 1988
- "Possession", by Iron Butterfly from Heavy, 1968
- "Possession", by Mandaryna from Mandarynkowy sen, 2005
- "Possession", by the Sisters of Mercy from First and Last and Always, 1985

== Other ==
- Possession (sports), control of the ball, generally conveying an opportunity to score
- Possessors, fictional characters in Marvel Comics
- A railway possession, where part of a live railway is closed for maintenance

== See also ==
- Adverse possession
- Dispossess
- Eviction
- Human possession in science fiction
- Possessed (disambiguation)
- Possession Island (disambiguation)
- Possessive (disambiguation)
- Repossession
- US Possession, soccer club on Réunion Island
- Possessors, a fictional race appearing in Marvel Comics
