= PZL.19 =

Polish sports aircraft built in 1932

PZL-19
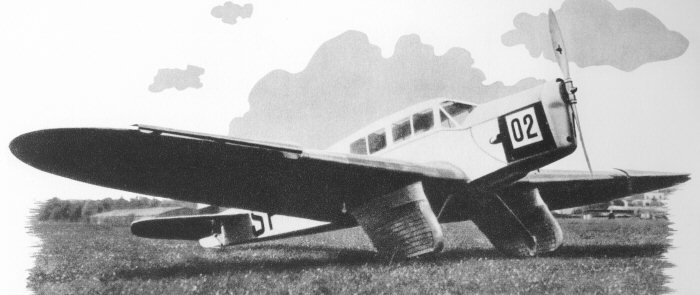
- PZL.19 SP-AHI

General information
- Type: Sports aircraft
- Manufacturer: PZL
- Primary user: Polish civilian aviation
- Number built: 3

History
- Manufactured: 1932
- Introduction date: 1932
- First flight: May 1932
- Retired: 1935

PZL.19 was a Polish sports aircraft built in 1932 in the PZL works. Ordered by the Ministry of Communications, it was specifically designed for the upcoming Challenge 1932 contest held that year in Germany.

== Development ==
The PZL.19 was designed by Jerzy Dąbrowski and Franciszek Misztal in 1931. The aircraft was of a modern construction, an all-metal cantilever low-wing monoplane with a fixed landing gear and a closed canopy. The crew of two sat in tandem, there also could be fitted one passenger seat behind. It was powered by a 120 hp de Havilland Gipsy III straight engine. Three aircraft were built in 1932, the first was flown in May 1932 by Bolesław Orliński. They carried registration SP-AHH, SP-AHI and SP-AHK.

After the Challenge and air meeting in Czechoslovakia all three aircraft were modified in winter 1932/1933 by addition of fuselage 140l fuel tanks, what increased range to 2000 km. In mid-1933 the SP-AHH was modified to carry 657l fuel, increasing range to some 5000 km, and the engine was replaced with a stronger 130 hp de Havilland Gipsy Major I (the SP-AHI also was given this engine).

== Design ==
PZL.19 is a metal construction low-wing monoplane, conventional in layout. Fuselage is a steel frame covered with duralumin in front and canvas at the rear. Trapezoid three-part wing with elliptical ends, covered with duralumin, folding rearwards. Its wings were built around light closed profiles instead of spars and were fitted with automatic slats and slotted flaps. The cab had three seats in tandem, under a common multi-part canopy, with double controls for the first two crew. It featured fixed landing gear with a rear skid, main wheels in massive covers. Its propeller was a two-blade metal design with variable pitch. Its fuel tanks were in wings and had a capacity of 140 L. The number and capacity of fuel tanks were later increased.

== Operational history ==
All three PZL.19 took part in the Challenge in August 1932. In a technical evaluation they were bested only by RWD-6, but technical trials and the race part were less successful. Jerzy Bajan finished on the 11th place, Ignacy Giedgowd on the 18th and Bolesław Orliński withdrew from the race due to illness. Despite its failure in the Challenge (which was won by the Polish RWD-6), it was regarded as a successful machine and took part in several Polish and international contests. All three took part in an air meeting in Prague in Czechoslovakia on 11 September 1932.

In May 1933, Jerzy Bajan and Piotr Dudziński flew on two PZL-19s a 4063 km raid from Warsaw, through Kharkov, Leningrad and Lwów to Vienna, taking the 1st and 2nd place in a rally to Vienna, where they took part in the 1st Alpen Flight international contest. During the contest, the SP-AHI was thrown by a wind to the trees while taking off from Baltant near Treibach, and then burnt (the crew Jerzy Bajan and Gustaw Pokrzywka had bailed out). Piotr Dudziński took the 3rd place in the contest, despite a damage in a forced landing.

On 11 September 1933, SP-AHH crashed near Kazan during an attempt of a long-distance record flight Warsaw-Krasnoyarsk. The aircraft went into a spin due to an air turbulence and hit the ground. The pilot Józef Lewoniewski was killed and the other crewman injured. The last PZL.19 was used in sports aviation - in the Poznań Aeroclub until 1935, when it was removed from the registry.

== Specifications (PZL.19 for 1932 Challenge) ==
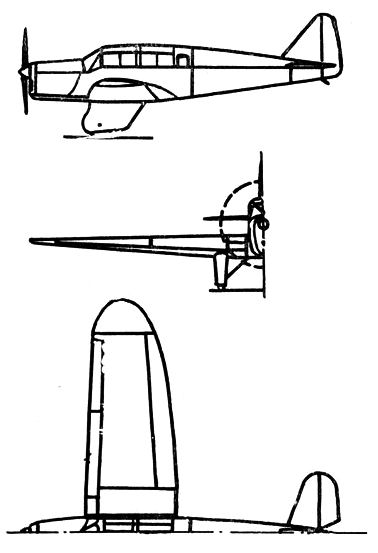
PZL 19 photo 3-view drawing from L'Aerophile Salon 1932

Data from Polish aircraft 1893-1939

General characteristics

- Crew: 1
- Capacity: 1 or 2 pax / 314 kg (692 lb) payload
- Length: 7.15 m (23 ft 5 in)
- Wingspan: 10.42 m (34 ft 2 in)
- Height: 2 m (6 ft 7 in)
- Wing area: 16 m^{2} (170 sq ft)
- Empty weight: 475 kg (1,047 lb)
- Gross weight: 800 kg (1,764 lb)
- Fuel capacity: 140 L (37 US gal; 31 imp gal) in wing tanks and 9 L (2.4 US gal; 2.0 imp gal) collector tank in the fuselage
- Powerplant: 1 × De Havilland Gipsy III 4-cylinder inverted air-cooled in-line piston engine, 89 kW (120 hp) for take-off

78 kW (105 hp) normal / max continuous

- Propellers: 2-bladed Ratier variable-pitch propeller

Performance

- Maximum speed: 228 km/h (142 mph, 123 kn) at sea level
- Cruise speed: 195 km/h (121 mph, 105 kn)
- Landing speed: 65 km/h (40 mph; 35 kn)
- Range: 1,000 km (620 mi, 540 nmi)
- Ferry range: 5,000 km (3,100 mi, 2,700 nmi) (SP-AHH after rebuild)
- Service ceiling: 4,000 m (13,000 ft)
- Rate of climb: 4 m/s (790 ft/min)
- Time to altitude: 1,000 m (3,300 ft) in 4 minutes 30 seconds
- Wing loading: 50 kg/m^{2} (10 lb/sq ft)
- Power/mass: 1.13 kW/kg (0.69 hp/lb)
- Take-off run to 8 m (26 ft): 130 m (430 ft)
- Landing run from 8 m (26 ft): 152 m (500 ft)

== See also ==
Related development

- PZL.26

Aircraft of comparable role, configuration, and era

- Breda Ba.33
- Heinkel He 64
- Klemm Kl 32
- Percival Gull
- Praga BH-111
