= BFW M.29 =

German 1930s single-engine racing aircraft

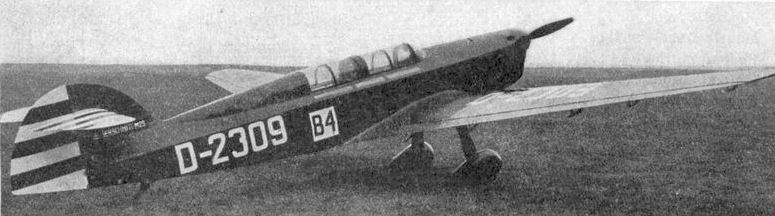

General information
- Type: Twin-seat sports/racing
- National origin: Germany
- Manufacturer: Bayerische Flugzeugwerke (BFW)
- Designer: Willy Messerschmitt
- Number built: 6

History
- First flight: 1932

The BFW M.29 was a single-engine twin-seat low-wing aircraft produced by the German aircraft manufacturer Bayerische Flugzeugwerke (BFW). It was designed by Willy Messerschmitt to participate in the 1932 Circuit of Europe races.

The M.29 was a low-wing cantilever monoplane of slightly smaller span than the preceding BFW M.23. It featured an enclosed continuous cockpit for two in tandem which blended smoothly into a dorsal fairing that extended aft to the fin. The latter carried a wide chord rudder and an all-moving tailplane, mounted on bracing towards the top of the fin. It had a clean cantilever spatted undercarriage. The wings could be folded at wing root hinges, back along the fuselage sides.

== Development ==
During the late 1920s, the German aeronautical engineer Willy Messerschmitt had undertaken the design of several capable racing aircraft. Specifically, separate BFW M.23s had won the Circuit of Europe or Challenge International de Tourisme during both 1929 and 1930; these victories, which came about as a result of the aircraft’s impressive performance, quickly garnered a favourable reputation and bolstered demand for Messerschmitt-designed aircraft. The announcement of the 1932 Circuit of Europe flight promptly led to Messerschmitt setting about producing an even more capable aircraft to capitalise on this opportunity; this work would result in the M.29.

It was a clean-sheet design that was specifically orientated towards the sport and touring sectors. Due to its high speed, the aircraft was envisioned as being particularly attraction to business men seeking to minimise travel time and time-conscious private owner-operators. However, even at the time of its development, it was noted that racing aircraft had typically been met with little demand from private fliers as those aircraft capable of high speed would typically have to perform high speed landings as well, which were more challenging to perform. Accordingly, one of the more ambitious designs goals for the M.29 was that it would be suitable for flying across an atypically wide range of speeds, greater than any aircraft of its type had previously attained. To achieve this, the aircraft possessed a substantial power excess, which permitted vigorous throttling of the engine; it was also claimed that, as a result of the M.39’s increased flight speed, it was more economical than other sport airplanes. Exhaustive aerodynamic investigations, which were performed at Gottingen, determined that the M.29 could attain a maximum speed of 260 kmph (161.6 mph) as well as a landing speed of only 55 to 60 kmph (34 to 37 mph) per hour.

The desired low-speed landing speed performance was achieved via the presence of both flaps and slots along the trailing edge of the wing. These provided a high degree of safety during low-speed flight that was further bolstered by the aileron’s angle of attack lagging behind increases of the flaps’ own angle of attack. The flaps were controlled using a straightforward lever in the cockpit; it would return automatically if the control pressure exceeds a certain amount, thus keeping the wing stresses within permissible limits at all times. When the flaps were fully deflected, the wing behaved similar to the Zanonia wing. In order to prevent the separation of the air flow into large angles of attack, the wingtips were slightly warped. The performance of the flaps and ailerons were such that pilots were capable of conducting a stalled landing without needing to level off. The wing, was entirely composed of wood, had only a single spar and was wholly cantilever. Together with the leading edge planking, this spar made the leading edge torsionally rigid, which was particularly desirable during especially high critical speeds in regards to vibrations. The wing had a pronounced taper along with a special profile that was claimed to possess quite favourable dynamic properties. The lower side of the wing had a six-degree dihedral. It had a medium-thickness wing section and was shaped so that the drag coefficient while flying at small angles of attack approached that of a contemporary racing aircraft. Via use of the flaps, the wing performed akin to one that had a ratio in excess of 200 between maximum lift and minimum drag.

Furthermore, the wing lacked a rigid profile; its profile characteristics, in combination with the favourable aerodynamic design of the majority of the aircraft (particularly the landing gear), has been attributed with enabling the substantial difference between the maximum and minimum speeds. When the flaps were drawn-in for high speed flight, the wing profile was equivalent to a profile with a fixed centre of pressure and kept the torsional stresses exerted on the wing to a low level even when flying at high speeds. The ribs, which were covered with fabric, were joined to the leading edge. Each wing was attached to the fuselage at three points.

The fuselage, which had an almost rectangular cross section, had a triangularly braced frame that was composed of tubular steel and covered with fabric. This covering was designed to have a favourable aerodynamic shape while the frame to which the wing spars were attached was constructed of sturdy girders. Similarly, the attachment point between the frame and the landing gear was strongly braced. Towards the aft end of the fuselage, the tubular steel structure continued into the vertical fin.

The top of the fuselage formed a built-up cabin that enclosed both the pilot and passenger. This cabin’s construction provided good visibility for its occupants, especially during the critical landing phase. If desired, the semi-circular covers could be tipped back from both cockpits. The side walls were transparent, which helped to illuminate the enclosed cabin and improve external visibility; these side walls were let down to leave the cabin. During an emergency scenario that necessitated rapid egress, the whole fuselage top could be quickly detached via a single handle; backpack parachutes could also be worn by the occupants.

A suite of instruments was provided for the pilot, which included an altimeter, compass, turn indicator, clock, speedometer, revolution counter, ignition and short-circuit switches, oil thermometer, oil manometer, and fuel gauge. These instruments were distributed across the cockpit so that one half was centred around the powerplant while the other half was mainly for navigation. Illumination of the instrument panel came via the transparent front and sides of the cabin. The cabin was fitted with adjustable upholstered and roomy seats that were equipped with arm rests. The occupants could pass items between one another and, while the top was closed, conversation was possible. The rudder bar could also be adjusted. Aft of the seats was a compact baggage compartment.

The tail unit featured surfaces that were entirely made of wood save for their fabric coverings. A pilot-operated mechanical stabilizer was fitted while the horizontal stabilizer was dispensed with. Use of this mechanical stabilizer made it possible to stabilize the airplane at any desired speed; this was an unusual practice at that time, even for aircraft that had been equipped with adjustable stabilizers,

The M.29 was equipped with cantilever landing gear that consisted of a pair of sturdy pneumatic struts that were intended to absorb all shocks from landing. Accommodating these struts made of use of the entire height of the fuselage; the shock absorbers had a typical stroke of between 30 and 40 cm (12 and 16 in.). The wheels were furnished with low-pressure balloon tyres and brakes. Both the struts and wheels were both faired. The landing gear, including the metal tail skit, were relatively strong, and were believed to be capable of withstanding a stalled landing. The skid was dampened using rubber chords and could swivel while the aircraft was taxying. The landing gear was designed to generate as little air resistance as possible.

The M.29 possessed considerable manoeuvrability while both the flight controls and control forces were relatively well balanced. All of the controls were easy to operate and service, being that many parts could be speedily replaced. A combination of cables and push rods were used along with a control stick. If desired, the M.29 could be fitted with dual controls, which could be disconnected by a simple turn of the head of the pilot’s control stick.

The aircraft was designed to be powered by a range of air-cooled engines in the 100 to 150 hp power range. Typical powerplants included a closely cowled 112 kW (150 hp) Siemens-Halske Sh 14a seven-cylinder radial engine (M.29a) or an air-cooled inverted inline Argus As 8R (a high-powered racing version of the Argus As 8) of the same power (M.29b). While the Argus engine was started using a hand crank, the Siemens unit used compressed air instead. Whichever engine was installed, it was mounted on supports composed of steel tubing. The cowling, which was composed of smooth sheet elektron, was divided and permitted easy access to the engine, magnetos and carburetor alike. All the tubes were composed of flexible rubber.

Fuel was housed within the front end of the fuselage behind the fire wall; it was supplied to the engine via gravity. The fuel tanks, which could hold up to 120 liters (about 32 gallons), could be easily removed. Dependent on which engine was fitted, the oil tank was either located at the bottom of the fuselage or on the upper side, where it would be screened separately from the engine itself.

== Operational history ==
Four aircraft of both variants were delivered for testing a few days before the start of racing on 27 August 1932. Initial reactions were that the machine was both fast and responsive. However, within days one aircraft had disintegrated in mid-air, killing the pilot and another was lost in the same way on approach to landing. The pilot in the second accident, Reinhold Poss bailed out, though his observer was killed, and reported that the disintegration began at the tailplane, progressing forward. All M.29s were grounded, missing the race, whilst the tail structure was strengthened.

The remaining race aircraft, which were joined by at least one more M.29, flew successfully after receiving modifications. There is photographic evidence of a minimum of six M.29s having been produced.

== Variants ==
Note

- M.29a: 112 kW (150 hp) Siemens Sh 14a radial engine
- M.29b: 112 kW (150 hp) Argus As 8R inline engine

== Specifications (M.29b) ==
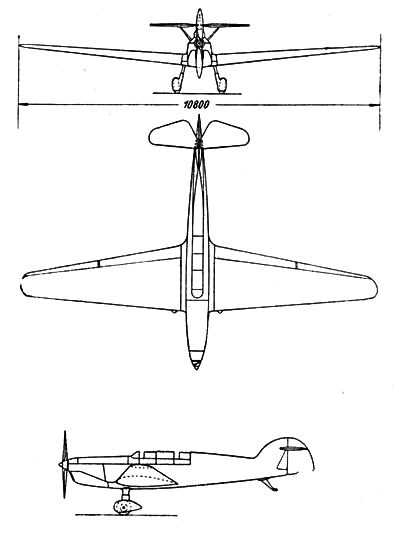
Messerschmitt M 29 3-view drawing from L'Aerophile Salon 1932

Data from Messerschmitt: an aircraft album, National Advisory Committee for Aeronautics

General characteristics

- Crew: two
- Length: 7.75 m (25 ft 5 in)
- Wingspan: 11.00 m (36 ft 1 in)
- Height: 2.00 m (6 ft 7 in)
- Empty weight: 390 kg (860 lb)
- Gross weight: 700 kg (1,544 lb)
- Powerplant: 1 × Argus As 8R air-cooled four-cylinder inverted in-line , 112 kW (150 hp)

Performance

- Maximum speed: 260 km/h (162 mph, 141 kn)
- Range: 700 km (435 mi, 378 nmi)
