= Praga BH-111 =

BH-111
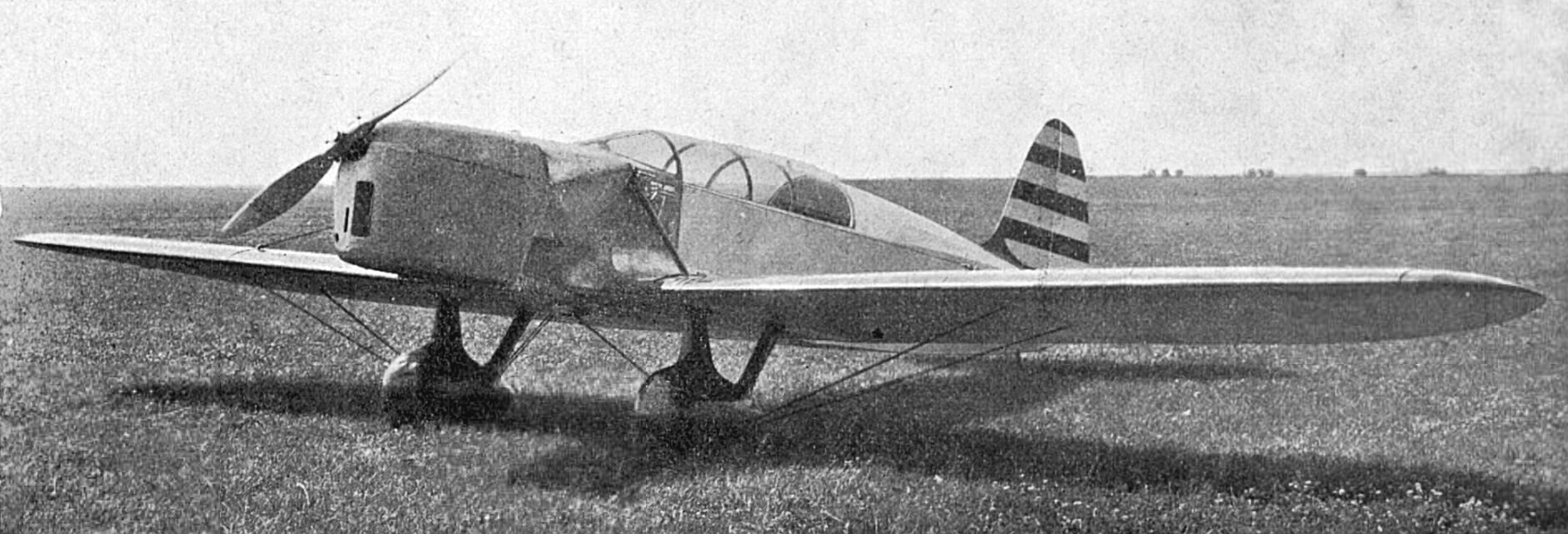

General information
- Type: Sportsplane
- Manufacturer: Praga
- Primary user: Czechoslovakia
- Number built: 3

History
- Manufactured: 1932
- First flight: 1932

The Praga BH-111 was a sportsplane of Czechoslovakia, designed and built specifically to compete in Challenge 1932, the European touring plane championships. It was a two-seater low-wing monoplane.

== Design and development ==
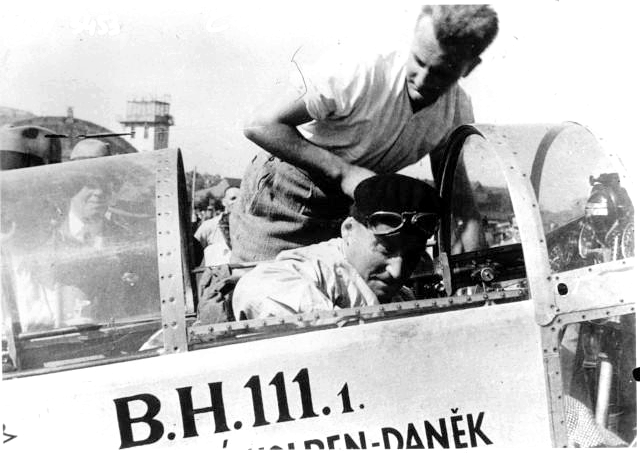
Praga BH-111 and Josef Kalla

The plane was designed by Pavel Beneš and Miroslav Hajn, hence BH letters. Only three aircraft were built, they carried registrations OK-BAH, OK-BEH and OK-BIH.

== Operational history ==
All three aircraft took part in the Challenge 1932. They took average places, the 16th (Josef Kalla) and 21st (František Klepš) for 43 aircraft. The third pilot Karel Mareš has not finished. In a technical evaluation, BH-111s scored the 4th result from 17 aircraft types taking part in the Challenge.

After the Challenge, they were used as touring aircraft in aero clubs. In 1935 they took part in a rally in Italy, taking the 5th and 27th place for 77 crews.

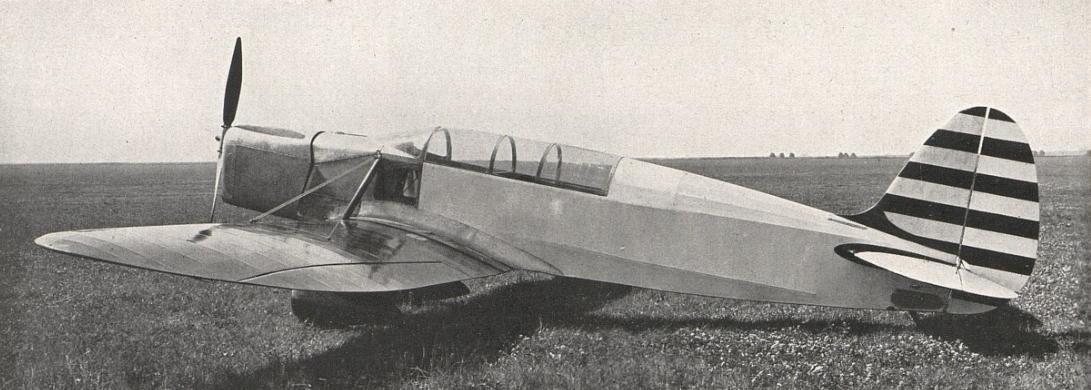
Praga BH-111 (1932)

== Description ==
Mixed construction low-wing monoplane, wing braced with short struts and wire. Fuselage of a steel frame, covered with canvas. Rectangular wings with rounded ends, of wooden construction, canvas covered, fitted with automatic slats and flaps. Wings were folding rearwards. Cab had two seats in tandem, with twin controls, under a common multi-part canopy. Fixed landing gear with a rear skid, main gear with aerodynamic covers. Inline engine in a fuselage nose, two-blade propeller.

== Specifications (BH-111) ==
Data from

General characteristics

- Crew: 1 or 2
- Capacity: 1 / 300 kg (661 lb) payload
- Length: 7.4 m (24 ft 3 in)
- Wingspan: 10.5 m (34 ft 5 in)
- Height: 2.9 m (9 ft 6 in)
- Wing area: 15.1 m^{2} (163 sq ft)
- Empty weight: 470 kg (1,036 lb)
- Gross weight: 770 kg (1,698 lb)
- Powerplant: 1 × de Havilland Gipsy III 4-cylinder air-cooled in-line piston engine, 89.7 kW (120.3 hp)
- Propellers: 2-bladed fixed-pitch propeller

Performance

- Maximum speed: 230 km/h (140 mph, 120 kn)
- Cruise speed: 200 km/h (120 mph, 110 kn)
- Stall speed: 75 km/h (47 mph, 40 kn) (less than)
- Service ceiling: 4,500 m (14,800 ft)
- Wing loading: 51 kg/m^{2} (10 lb/sq ft)
- Power/mass: 0.12 kW/kg (0.073 hp/lb)

== See also ==
Aircraft of comparable role, configuration, and era

- Breda Ba.33
- Heinkel He 64
- PZL.19
