= Poss =

Poss may refer to:

- National Geographic Society – Palomar Observatory Sky Survey, a major photographic survey of the night sky
- Professional open-source software
- Polyhedral oligomeric silsesquioxane, an organic-inorganic hybrid compound with inorganic cubic core and outer organic groups.
- Post Open Source software

== People ==
- Barry Poss, co-founder of bluegrass label Sugar Hill Records
- Greg Poss (b. 1965), former American hockey player and current coach
- Janet Poss (died 2019), American politician
- Nadine Poss (b. 1991), the 2013/14 German Wine Queen
- Reinhold Poss (1897–1933), German flying ace and racing pilot
- Robert Poss, an American guitarist and music producer

== See also ==
- Posse (disambiguation)
- Possessive (disambiguation)
- Possibility (disambiguation)
