= Mauboussin M.112 =

1930s French light aircraft

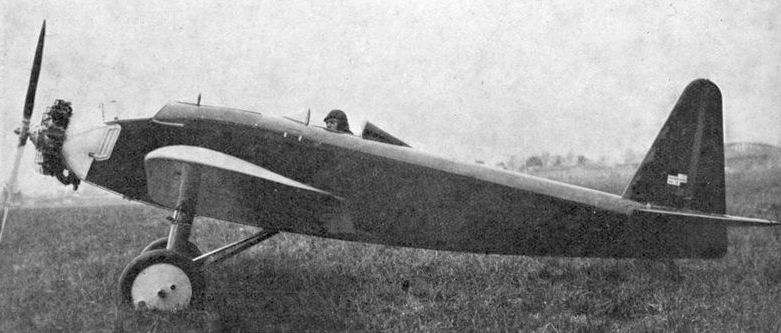

General information
- Type: Two-seat touring aircraft
- National origin: France
- Manufacturer: Louis Peyret in the Zodiac factory
- Designer: Pierre Mauboussin
- Number built: 6

History
- First flight: 5 September 1931
- Developed into: Mauboussin M.120 series

The Mauboussin M.112, M-12 or Mauboussin M.XII was originally called the Peyret-Mauboussin PM XII and was renamed when Mauboussin founded his own company in 1931, ending his partnership with Louis Peyret. It was a French, single-engine, two-seat, low cantilever wing touring monoplane. At least six were built.

== Design and development ==
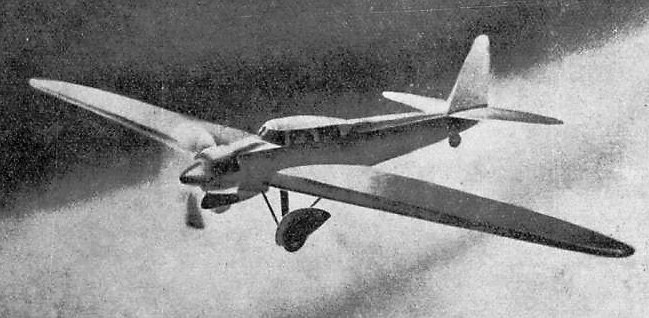
Mauboussin M.12 with cockpit canopy from Annuaire de L'Aéronautique 1931

The low, cantilever wing of the M.112 was built in three parts, a tapered centre-section which was part of the fuselage and trapezoidal outer panels with elliptical tips. Its aspect ratio of 9.5 was high for the time. The outer panels carried mild dihedral and full-span, narrow-chord ailerons. The wings were completely wooden, with twin box spars and alder plywood skin.

It was powered by an uncowled 30 kW (40 hp) Salmson 9Ad nine-cylinder radial engine with its fuel tanks in the wing centre-section. Behind it, beyond a firewall, the wooden fuselage had a rectangular section defined by four longerons, though the upper decking was curved. It was covered in plywood. The M.112 had a pair of tandem seats over the wing, with the pilot at the rear. These seats could be open or enclosed by a removable cover. The fuselage tapered to the rear where the tail surfaces, also ply-covered, were straight-tapered and round tipped. Both horizontal and vertical surfaces had quite high aspect ratios and the vertical tail was tall; the horizontal tail was mounted on top of the fuselage. Both rudder and elevators were aerodynamically unbalanced.

The M.112 had conventional, fixed landing gear. Its mainwheels, fitted with brakes, were on cranked axles and drag struts, both hinged from the lower fuselage longerons. There were short, vertical Messier oleo struts from the outer axles to the forward wing spars in the centre-section, giving it a track of 2.2 m (7 ft 3 in). Its tailskid, which could be replaced with a wheel, castered and had twin small bungee shock absorbers.

== Operational history ==
Built at the Zenith factory, the M.XII first flew in September 1931. In August 1932, flown by André Nicolle and registered as a Mauboussin M.112, it competed in the Challenge International de Tourisme 1932 (English: 1932 International touring aircraft Competition), which involved both technical tests and a 7,200 km (4,500 mi) circuit around Europe. It came last, but with its very low-powered engine, was the only aircraft in its class. It also appeared at the 1932 Paris Aero Salon. The French civil aircraft register included six M.112s, used by aero clubs and individuals.

Aircraft in the Mauboussin M.120 Corsaire series which followed were similar to the M.112 but heavier and with more powerful engines.

== Specifications ==
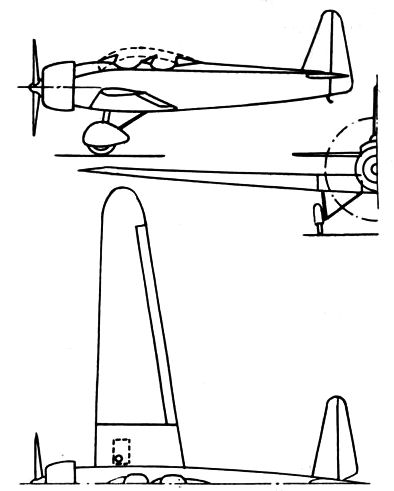
Mauboussin XII 3-view drawing from L'Aerophile Salon 1932

Data from Les Ailes, October 1931 Performance figures calculated

General characteristics

- Crew: One pilot
- Capacity: One passenger
- Length: 6.34 m (20 ft 10 in)
- Wingspan: 11.75 m (38 ft 7 in)
- Height: 2.86 m (9 ft 5 in) to propeller-tip
- Wing area: 14.78 m^{2} (159.1 sq ft)
- Aspect ratio: 9.5
- Empty weight: 280 kg (617 lb)
- Gross weight: 516 kg (1,138 lb)
- Fuel capacity: 60 L (13 imp gal; 16 US gal)
- Powerplant: 1 × Salmson 9Ad 9-cylinder radial, 30 kW (40 hp)
- Propellers: 2-bladed Levasseur, metal

Performance

- Maximum speed: 150 km/h (93 mph, 81 kn)
- Cruise speed: 130 km/h (81 mph, 70 kn)
- Stall speed: 65 km/h (40 mph, 35 kn) minimum flying speed
- Range: 700 km (430 mi, 380 nmi)
- Service ceiling: 5,000 m (16,000 ft)
