= Challenge International de Tourisme 1932 =

The Challenge 1932 was the third FAI International Tourist Plane Competition (French: Challenge International de Tourisme), that took place between 12 and August 28, 1932, in Berlin, Germany. The four Challenges, from 1929 to 1934, were major aviation events in pre-war Europe.

== Overview ==
Germany organized the contest, because German pilot Fritz Morzik won the previous Challenge in 1930. The number of aircraft that took part in the 1932 Challenge was smaller - 43 compared to 60, because the contest was getting much more difficult with time, demanding high pilotage skills and more advanced aircraft. This time, most countries developed new aircraft specifically for the Challenge. There were 67 entries reported, but as much as 24 aircraft did not show up, partly because of unfinished development or crashes during tests.

Teams from six countries entered the Challenge in 1932: Germany (16 crews), France (8 crews), Italy (8 crews), Poland (5 crews), Czechoslovakia (4 crews) and Switzerland (2 crews). English aviator Winifred Spooner entered the contest in the Italian team, being the only woman among the pilots. One Canadian (John Carberry) and one Romanian pilot (Alexander Papana) entered the contest in the German team.

The opening ceremony was on August 12, 1932, at Berlin-Staaken airfield. The contest consisted of three parts: technical trials, a rally around Europe and a maximum speed test. Since one of the aims of the Challenge was to stimulate progress in aircraft development, it was not only pilots' competition, but technical trials also included a construction evaluation that promoted more advanced designs.

== Aircraft ==
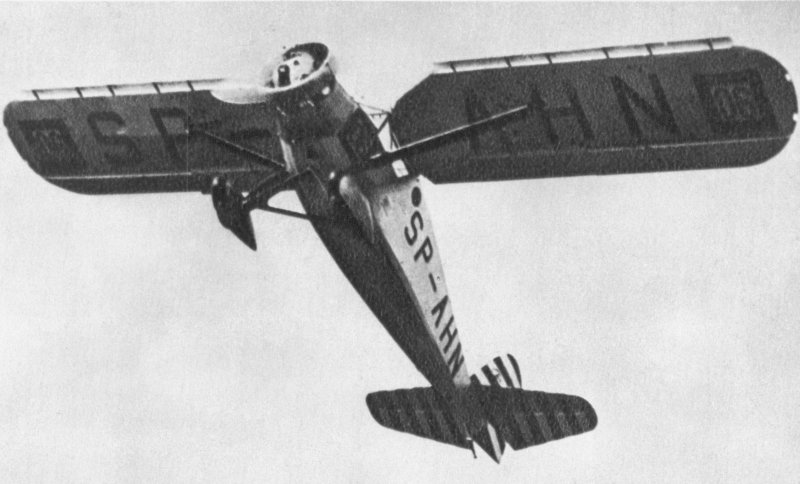
RWD-6 of Franciszek Zwirko during short take-off trial

The Challenge was to be a contest of tourist aircraft, so competing aircraft had to be able to take at least two persons aboard, take off and land on a short field and cover a distance with a good cruising speed. In fact, Germany, Poland, Czechoslovakia and Italy developed modern sports aircraft specifically to meet the demands of the Challenge. Before the contest, a favourite was German Messerschmitt's BFW M.29, offering the highest performance, but due to two crashes during training, all BFWs were withdrawn. Their place as German favourites was taken by six fast Heinkel He 64s. Most numerous German aircraft was the three-seater Klemm Kl 32 (7 plus one in Swiss team). Both were wooden low-wing monoplanes. Italy and Czechoslovakia developed similar strutted low-wing monoplanes, the Breda Ba.33 and Praga BH-111. Poland developed a high-wing RWD-6 and an all-metal low-wing monoplane PZL.19. All these aircraft had enclosed crew cabins, fixed landing gear and advanced wing mechanization (flaps and slat). The other aircraft, especially French, modified from serial designs, were less modern and had lower chances in technical trials.

Aircraft participating were: Klemm Kl 32 (8), Breda Ba.33 (8), Heinkel He 64 (6), Praga BH-111 (3), PZL.19 (3), RWD-6 (2), Potez 43 (2), Farman 234 (2), Farman 353 (1), Darmstadt D-22a (1), Raab-Katzenstein RK-25/32 (1), Breda Ba.15S (1), Monocoupe 110 (1), Guerchais T.9 (1), Caudron C.278 (1), Mauboussin M.112 (1), Comte AC-12 (1).

The German aircraft had starting numbers from a range: A4-A9, B1-B9, C2-C8, E1-E2, French: K1-K8, Italian: M1-M8, Polish: O1-O6, Swiss: S1-S2, Czechoslovak: T1-T4 (numbers were placed on fuselages in a black square frame).

== Technical trials ==
On August 13 the technical evaluation of the competing planes' construction took place. Since it was a tourist plane contest, features such as: a comfortable cabin with a good view, seats placed side-by-side, a rich set of controls, modern construction, safety devices and folding wings were also awarded points. Most points were given to the Polish designs (86 points to the RWD-6 and 84 points to the PZL.19), behind them the Italian Breda Ba.33 (83 points) and Praga BH-111 (80 points). This gave them more than ten points' advantage over most feared German designs (Kl 32 - 71-72 points, He 64c - 66 points), and placed them as favourites from this point. Worst planes scored 44 points (Caudron C.278 biplane and Mauboussin M.12).

The first trial was a minimal speed trial, to evaluate the aircraft safety, which was new in Challenge contests. Flying on the edge of stalling, Franciszek Żwirko was the slowest with 57.6 km/h speed, the second was another Pole flying an RWD-6, Tadeusz Karpiński. Behind them were the Italians, the German He 64s and the French Raymond Delmotte (C.278) with good results ranging from 61.2 to 65.7 km/h, and then the rest. The regulations did not expect such low speeds and therefore all seven results below 63 km/h were awarded with 50 points.

Top results of the minimal speed trial
	Pilot	Country	Aircraft	Speed	Points
1.	Franciszek Żwirko	Poland	RWD-6	57.6 km/h	50 pts
2.	Tadeusz Karpiński	Poland	RWD-6	60.8 km/h	50 pts
3.	Francesco Lombardi	Italy	Ba.33	61.2 km/h	50 pts
4.	Ambrogio Colombo	Italy	Ba.33	61.4 km/h	50 pts
5.	Winifred Spooner	United Kingdom	Ba.33	61.5 km/h	50 pts
6.	Werner Junck	Germany	He 64c	62.1 km/h	50 pts
7.	Hans Seidemann	Germany	He 64b	62.4 km/h	50 pts

Next there were trials of a short take off and landing, carried out in groups until 17 August 1932. The short take-off trial required the crews to fly over an 8-m high gate. The German pilot Wolfram Hirth (Kl 32) was the best, taking off from the closest distance (91.6m - 40 pts), two Italians Colombo and Lombardi scored 40 points as well, other Klemms and Bredas were also at the head. Polish RWD-6s scored 37 points (111.5 and 115 m).

Top results of the short take-off trial
	Pilot	Country	Aircraft	Distance	Points
1.	Wolf Hirth	Germany	Kl 32	91.6 m	40 pts
2.	Francesco Lombardi	Italy	Ba.33	97.5 m	40 pts
3.	Ambrogio Colombo	Italy	Ba.33	100 m	40 pts
4.	Reinhold Poss	Germany	Kl 32	100.3 m	39 pts
5.	Robert Fretz	Switzerland	Kl 32	102.6 m	39 pts
6.	Vittorio Suster	Italy	Ba.33	105.6 m	38 pts

Next, a short landing trial followed, from behind an 8 m high gate. The best result, 92.4 m (40 pts), was achieved by Winifred Spooner. Good results were scored by Klemms, Bredas, RWD-6s and French Potez 43s. After the technical evaluation and these two trials, the leaders in the general classification were: the Italian Ambrogio Colombo and the Pole Franciszek Żwirko on the RWD-6. The next places were taken by an Italian team, then by the Germans and Poles, then the rest.

Top results of the short landing trial
	Pilot	Country	Aircraft	Distance	Points
1.	Winifred Spooner	United Kingdom	Ba.33	92.4 m	40 pts
2.	Reinhold Poss	Germany	Kl 32	97.8 m	40 pts
3.	G. Viazzo	Italy	Ba.33	101.9 m	39 pts
4.	Georges Detré	France	Potez 43	102.8 m	39 pts
5.	Franciszek Żwirko	Poland	RWD-6	105.8 m	38 pts
6.	Ambrogio Colombo	Italy	Ba.33	107.3 m	38 pts
7.	Robert Fretz	Switzerland	Kl 32	107.4 m	38 pts

August 16 saw a trial of quick folding of wings, which was a feature to save place in hangars, and then a trial of quick engine starting. The general classification changed little after these trials, with Żwirko and Colombo holding on to a joint lead with 222 points each.

A fuel consumption trial on a 300 km distance was held on August 19, and the German aircraft won in that category. After all technical trials, Ambrogio Colombo led the general classification, with Franciszek Żwirko second, Italy's Francesco Lombardi third.

Top results of the technical trials:
	Pilot	Country	Aircraft	Points
1.	Ambrogio Colombo	Italy	Breda Ba.33	247 pts
2.	Franciszek Żwirko	Poland	RWD-6	245 pts
3.	Francesco Lombardi	Italy	Breda Ba.33	242 pts
4/5.	Winifred Spooner	United Kingdom	Breda Ba.33	241 pts
4/5.	Renato Donati	Italy	Breda Ba.33	241 pts
6/7.	Tadeusz Karpiński	Poland	RWD-6	238 pts
6/7.	Mario Stoppani	Italy	Breda Ba.33	238 pts
8.	Vittorio Suster	Italy	Breda Ba.33	235 pts
9.	Reinhold Poss	Germany	Klemm Kl 32	234 pts
10.	Robert Fretz	Switzerland	Klemm Kl 32	231 pts

Before the next part, Winifred Spooner was forced to land near Berlin due to sabotage of her fuel, and she decided to withdraw.

== Rally over Europe ==
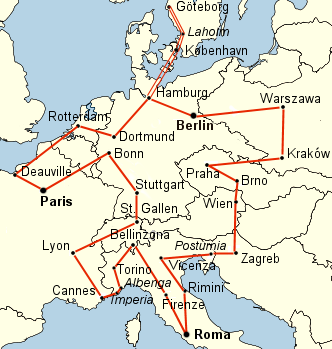

The second part of the Challenge was a 7363 km rally over Europe, on a path: Berlin - Warsaw - Kraków - Prague - Brno – Vienna - Zagreb - Postumia (checkpoint) - Vicenza - Rimini - Rome - Florence - Bellinzona - Turin – Albenga (checkpoint) – Imperia (checkpoint) - Cannes - Lyon - St. Gallen - Stuttgart - Bonn - Paris - Deauville – Rotterdam - Dortmund – Hamburg - Copenhagen – Laholm (checkpoint) - Gothenburg - Laholm (checkpoint) - Copenhagen - Hamburg – Berlin. 39 aircraft took part in the race. Main waypoints were Rome and Paris. Longest section was Berlin – Warsaw (518 km), the shortest - Brno – Vienna (106.4 km).

The rally started on August 21. From the beginning, the German crews tried to take advantage of faster aircraft and make up for the points lost in the technical trials. The Italians tried to be the first in Rome, racing against the Germans. On the other side, the Poles, with slower planes, tried to keep a good cruise speed and flight regularity, which were awarded with points in the rally. On the first day, most crews reached Vienna or Zagreb, while the Italians reached Vicenza. Ambrogio Colombo and three Germans (von Massenbach, Seidemann and Marienfeld) got as far as Rimini. Three crews withdrew on the way due to breakdowns. On August 22, the competitors landed in Rome, but the German pilot Hans Seidemann was first. Only 33 crews reached Rome, three had forced crash landings (among others, the Romanian Aleksander Papana flying Monocoupe 110).

On August 23, the competitors took off from Rome. On that day, two Italian Bredas crashed due to weak wing construction (one mechanic died bailing out). As a result, Italy decided to withdraw all the Italian teams from the Challenge, Ambrogio Colombo being the leader by then. On August 24, the 25 remaining crews reached Paris. On August 27, the competitors finished in Berlin. The first pilot in Berlin, and the fastest in the whole race, was the German Hans Seidemann with a cruise speed of 213 km/h, flying the Heinkel He 64b. The next seven results were also German. Franciszek Żwirko arrived in 11th place, with a cruise speed of 191 km/h.

Top results of the rally:
	Pilot	country	aircraft	average speed	points
1.	Hans Seidemann	Germany	Heinkel He 64b	213 km/h	220 pts
2.	Wolfgang Stein	Germany	He 64c	208 km/h	220 pts
3.	Dietrich von Massenbach	Germany	He 64c	206 km/h	220 pts
4.	Walter Marienfeld	Germany	Darmstadt D-22a	205 km/h	220 pts
5.	Wolf Hirth	Germany	Klemm Kl 32	203 km/h	220 pts
6.	Fritz Morzik	Germany	He 64c	200 km/h	220 pts
7.	Otto Cuno	Germany	Kl 32	198 km/h	218 pts
8/9.	Reinhold Poss	Germany	Kl 32	197 km/h	217 pts
8/9.	Robert Fretz	Switzerland	Kl 32	197 km/h	217 pts
10.	Robert Lusser	Germany	Kl 32	193 km/h	213 pts
11/12.	Franciszek Żwirko	Poland	RWD-6	191 km/h	211 pts
11/12.	Josef Kalla	Czechoslovakia	Praga BH-111	191 km/h	211 pts
13.	Jerzy Bajan	Poland	PZL.19	188 km/h	206 pts

After the technical trials and the rally, Franciszek Żwirko held first place in the general classification with 456 points, with Reinhold Poss in second with 451 pts, Wolf Hirth in third with 450 pts and Robert Fretz (Suiss) in fourth with 448 pts. Fritz Morzik was fifth with 444 pts.

== Maximum speed trial ==
The last part of the Challenge was a maximum speed trial, on a 300 km triangular course. The beginning and landing was on August 28 at the Berlin-Staaken airfield.

The fastest was the German Fritz Morzik (He 64c) with 241.3 km/h. The next four places were also occupied by Heinkels. Żwirko's closest rival, Reinhold Poss flying a Klemm Kl 32, was in 7th position (220.7 km/h). The fastest Pole was Tadeusz Karpiński (8th position, 216.2 km/h, RWD-6), while Franciszek Żwirko took the 13th position with 214.1 km/h.

Due to a handicapping system, contestants took off in order of general classification, with proper intervals, and a number of points given in the speed trial meant that the first on the finish line would be the winner of all contest. As a result, minutes could decide the final victory in the Challenge. Taking off 12 minutes after Żwirko, Morzik landed 83 seconds after him - if he had overrun Żwirko, he would have won. Poss, starting five minutes after the leader, was 2 minutes 30 seconds short.

== Results ==
A closing ceremony was held after the maximum speed test on August 28. The winners were the Polish crew: pilot Franciszek Żwirko and mechanic Stanisław Wigura, with 461 points. Their success was not only a result of their aviation skills, but also of the technical features of their Polish-designed RWD-6 (which Wigura had co-designed). Due to Żwirko's victory, the next Challenge 1934 was organized in Warsaw.

The second and third place was occupied jointly by Germans: Fritz Morzik (Heinkel He 64c, the winner of the Challenge 1930) and Reinhold Poss (Klemm Kl 32V) with 458 points. The 5th place was taken by Switzerland's Robert Frenz flying German Klemm Kl 32. Tadeusz Karpiński flying the other RWD-6, took the 9th place. The best Czech, Josef Kalla, took 16th place, the best French contestant, Raymond Delmotte - 20th place. The Challenge was completed by only 24 crews out of 43 (12 German, 4 Polish, 4 French, 3 Czechoslovak and 1 Swiss).

Final results
	Pilot	country	aircraft	registration / starting number	points: technical + race + speed	= total
1.	Franciszek Żwirko	Poland	RWD-6	SP-AHN / O6	245 + 211 + 5	461
2/3.	Fritz Morzik	Germany	Heinkel He 64c	D-2304 / C6	224 + 220 + 14	458
2/3.	Reinhold Poss	Germany	Klemm Kl 32	D-2261 / B9	234 + 217 + 7	458
4.	Wolfgang Stein	Germany	Heinkel He 64c	D-2302 / A8	221 + 220 + 12	453
5.	Robert Fretz	Switzerland	Klemm Kl 32	CH-360 / S2	231 + 217 + 4	452
6.	Wolf Hirth	Germany	Klemm Kl 32	D-2328 / E1	230 + 220 + 0	450
7/8.	Otto Cuno	Germany	Klemm Kl 32	D-2310 / C2	224 + 218 + 5	447
7/8.	Hans Seidemann	Germany	Heinkel He 64b	D-2260 / A9	214 + 220 + 13	447
9.	Tadeusz Karpiński	Poland	RWD-6	SP-AHL / O4	238 + 200 + 5	443
10.	Robert Lusser	Germany	Klemm Kl 32	D-2311 / B6	219 + 213 + 5	437
11.	Jerzy Bajan	Poland	PZL.19	SP-AHK / O3	223 + 206 + 4	433
12/13.	Georg Pasewaldt	Germany	Klemm Kl 32	D-2320 / C4	219 + 202 + 5	426
12/13.	Theo Osterkamp	Germany	Klemm Kl 32	D-2312 / B7	219 + 204 + 3	426
14.	Werner Junck	Germany	Heinkel He 64c	D-2305 / E2	225 + 186 + 13	424
15.	Dietrich von Massenbach	Germany	Heinkel He 64c	D-2303 / A6	183 + 220 + 12	415
16.	Josef Kalla	Czechoslovakia	Praga BH-111	OK-BAH / T2	192 + 211 + 5	408
17.	Walter Marienfeld	Germany	Darmstadt D-22a	D-2222 / B8	145 + 220 + 10	375
18.	Ignacy Giedgowd	Poland	PZL.19	SP-AHI / O2	198 + 142 + 5	345
19.	Jan Anderle	Czechoslovakia	Breda Ba.15S	OK-WAL / T1	143 + 130 + 0	273
20.	Raymond Delmotte	France	Caudron C.278	F-ALXB / K4	192 + 73 + 0	265
21.	František Klepš	Czechoslovakia	Praga BH-111	OK-BEH / T4	196 + 25 + 0	221
22.	Piere Duroyon	France	Potez 43	F-AMBN / K3	171 + 43 + 0	214
23.	Maurice Arnoux	France	Farman F-234	F-ALLY / K5	89 + 73 + 0	162
24.	André Nicolle	France	Mauboussin M.112	F-ALVX / K6	111 + 40 + 0	151

The first prize in the Challenge was 100,000 French franc, the 2nd - 50,000 FRF, the 3rd - 25,000 FRF, the 4th - 13,000 FRF, 16 other crews would get 7,000 FRF.

Less than a month after the Challenge, Franciszek Zwirko and Stanislaw Wigura died in an accident, flying their RWD-6 to Czechoslovakia in a storm on September 11, 1932. The crash occurred in a forest near Cierlicko, close to Cieszyn. A memorial known as Żwirkowisko was later established at the crash site and remains a place of remembrance for the two aviators.

Reinhold Poss also died in an accident in 1933. Winifred Spooner died the same year.

== See also ==
- Challenge International de Tourisme
- Challenge 1929
- Challenge 1930
- Challenge 1934

== Sources ==
- Marian Krzyżan: "Międzynarodowe turnieje lotnicze 1929-1934", Warsaw 1988, ISBN 83-206-0637-3 (Polish language)
- International Touring Competition in: Flight, Nr. 1234, 19 August 1932, pp. 771–773
- Edwin Heinze, The International Touring Competition in Flight, 26 August 1932, Nr. 1235, pp. 803–808
- Edwin Heinze, The International Touring Competition in Flight, 2 September 1932, Nr. 1236, pp. 826–830
