= Darmstadt D-22 =

Sports aircraft

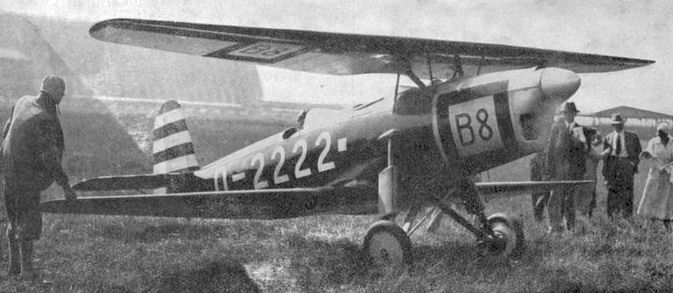

General information
- Type: Sportsplane
- Manufacturer: Akaflieg Darmstadt
- Primary user: Germany
- Number built: 2

History
- Manufactured: 1931
- First flight: 1931

The Darmstadt D-22 was a sports-plane of Germany, designed and built by Akaflieg of Technische Universität Darmstadt.

== Design and development ==
The aircraft was designed by F. Fecher in the Akaflieg (academic group of flyers) of Technische Universität Darmstadt. It was a development of Darmstadt D-18, slightly enlarged, more streamlined and fitted with an inline engine. Thanks to strengthening it was better fit to aerobatics. Two were built in 1931.

Just like the D-18, the D-22 was a cantilever biplane, with an upper wing placed low above a fuselage and ahead of a lower wing. Aerodynamic cleanliness and low weight were emphasised in the design, resulting in a small aircraft with clean lines.

=== Description ===
The D-22 was of wooden construction with cantilever biplane and oval cross-section fuselage skinned with plywood and fabric on parts of the single-spar wings, which could be dismounted and folded rearwards. The two crew sat in open cockpits in tandem, with windshields. The landing gear was fixed with a rear fuselage skid. The engine was mounted in the fuselage nose and drove a two-bladed fixed-pitch propeller. Fuel was supplied from a 100 L (26 US gal; 22 imp gal) tank in the fuselage.

== Operational history ==
The second aircraft, D-2222, a D-22a, took part in the Challenge 1932 international tourist aircraft contest, piloted by Walter Marienfeld. It was handicapped in technical trials, especially the short landing trial, not having flaps or slats, being relegated to 35th place, from 43 participants, after this section. It improved its score after a rally around Europe, where it took the 4th place, with a cruise speed of 205 km/h (127 mph; 111 kn). In the maximum speed trial it was beaten only by the five Heinkel He 64s, reaching 230.7 km/h (143.4 mph; 124.6 kn). As a result, it completed the contest in 17th place. Re-registered as D-EQIN from 1933, it was in use for several years after the Challenges.

== Specifications (D-22) ==
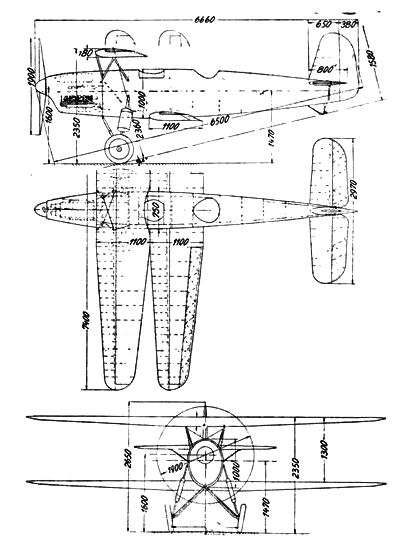
Darmstadt D-22 3-view drawing from L'Aerophile Salon 1932

Data from

General characteristics

- Crew: 1
- Capacity: 1 / 255 kg (562 lb) payload
- Length: 6.6 m (21 ft 8 in)
- Wingspan: 7.4 m (24 ft 3 in)
- Height: 2.4 m (7 ft 10 in)
- Wing area: 13 m^{2} (140 sq ft)
- Empty weight: 345 kg (761 lb)
- Gross weight: 600 kg (1,323 lb)
- Fuel capacity: 100 L (26 US gal; 22 imp gal)
- Powerplant: 1 × Argus As 8 4-cylinder inverted air-cooled in-line piston engine, 75.7 kW (101.5 hp)
- Propellers: 2-bladed fixed-pitch propeller

Performance

- Maximum speed: 230 km/h (140 mph, 120 kn)
- Cruise speed: 200 km/h (120 mph, 110 kn)
- Stall speed: 82 km/h (51 mph, 44 kn) ~
- Range: 800 km (500 mi, 430 nmi)
- Service ceiling: 6,200 m (20,300 ft)
