= Argus As 8 =

1930s German piston aircraft engine

As 8
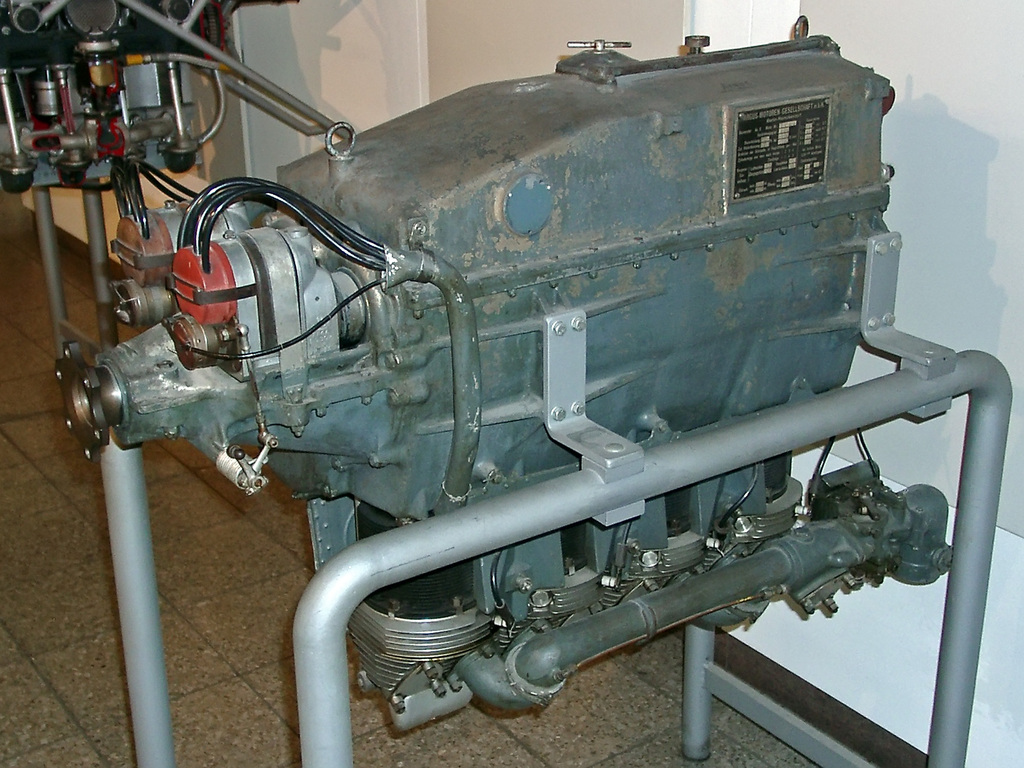
- Argus As 8 aircraft engine
- Type: Piston aircraft engine
- Manufacturer: Argus Motoren

The Argus As 8 was a four-cylinder, air-cooled, inverted inline aircraft engine produced in Germany by Argus Motoren in the 1930s.

== Variants ==
As 8A
Initial production version 71 kW (95 hp) maximum for 5 minutes, 60 kW (80 hp) continuous.
As 8B
A more powerful variant developing 101 kW (135 hp) maximum for 5 minutes, 86 kW (115 hp) continuous.
As 8R
A variant produced for sport aircraft, particularly for competition use, developing 110 kW (150 hp) for take-off. Featuring:
- Increased compression ratio, from 5.36 to 5.8
- Improved cooling by increasing the numbers of cooling fins at the cylinder head and the cylinder body
- Increasing the heat dispersing area of the pistons
- Improved crankcase and oil cooling
- Improved cylinder charging
- Modified valve timing

== Applications ==
- Albatros L 100
- Albatros Al 101
- Arado L II (As 8A)
- Arado L IIa (As 8R)
- Baumgärtl Heliofly III
- BFW M.23
- BFW M.27
- BFW M.29
- BFW M.35
- Blohm & Voss Ha 136
- Comte AC-12 Moskito
- Darmstadt D-22
- DFS 40
- Focke-Wulf Fw 44
- Heinkel He 64
- Heinkel He 72
- Klemm L 25E
- Klemm Kl 32
- Raab-Katzenstein RK.25/32
- Ruhrtaler Ru.3

== Specifications (As 8B) ==
Data from Flugzeug-Typenbuch. Handbuch der deutschen Luftfahrt- und Zubehör-Industrie 1944, Argus AS-8R

=== General characteristics ===
- Type: 4-cylinder inverted air-cooled in-line piston engine
- Bore: 120 mm (4.72 in)
- Stroke: 140 mm (5.51 in)
- Displacement: 6.332 L (386.40 cu in)
- Length: 1,075 mm (42.3 in) without airscrew hub
- Width: 470 mm (18.5 in)
- Height: 731 mm (28.8 in)
- Dry weight: 116 kg (256 lb) dry

128.4 kg (283 lb) equipped

=== Components ===
- Valvetrain: Overhead valves operated by pushrods and rockers
- Fuel system: One down-draught carburretor
- Fuel type: 80 Octane Aviation gasoline
- Oil system: Pressure feed at 3–6 bar (44–87 psi)
- Cooling system: Air-cooled

=== Performance ===
- Power output:

- 135 PS (133 hp; 99 kW) at 2,200 rpm (5 minutes) at sea level
- 125 PS (123 hp; 92 kW) at 2,150 rpm (30 minutes) at sea level
- 115 PS (113 hp; 85 kW) at 2,090 rpm (max continuous) at sea level

- Specific power: 21.3 PS/L (0.344 hp/cu in; 15.7 kW/L)
- Compression ratio: 5.35:1
- Specific fuel consumption:

- 0.235 kg/PSh (0.53 lb/(hp⋅h); 0.320 kg/kWh) at maximum rpm
- 0.230 kg/PSh (0.51 lb/(hp⋅h); 0.313 kg/kWh) at maximum continuous rpm

- Oil consumption: 0.008 kg/PSh (0.018 lb/(hp⋅h); 0.011 kg/kWh) at maximum continuous rpm
- Power-to-weight ratio: 1.149 PS/kg (0.514 hp/lb; 0.845 kW/kg)
- B.M.E.P.: 7.7 atm (7.8 bar; 113 psi)

== See also ==
Comparable engines

- Alfa Romeo 110
- Blackburn Cirrus Major
- de Havilland Gipsy Major
- Elizalde Tigre IV
- Hirth HM 504
- Menasco C4

Related lists

- List of aircraft engines
