= Possessive (disambiguation) =

In linguistics, a possessive is a word or construction that indicates possession or similar relationship.

== See also ==
- Possession (linguistics), for the relationships indicated by grammatical possessives
- Possessive case, a grammatical case used in possessive constructions in some languages
- Possessive determiner (or possessive adjective), a word modifying nouns in possessive constructions, such as my, their
- Possessive pronoun, a word used independently in possessive constructions, such as mine, theirs
- Possessive affix, a prefix or suffix used added to a word in some languages to indicate the possessor
- English possessive, the above forms as found in the English language
- Posesif, a 2017 Indonesian drama film.
- Possession (disambiguation)
- Possessed (disambiguation)
- The Dispossessed, novel
- Dispossess
