= Elana Johnson =

American author

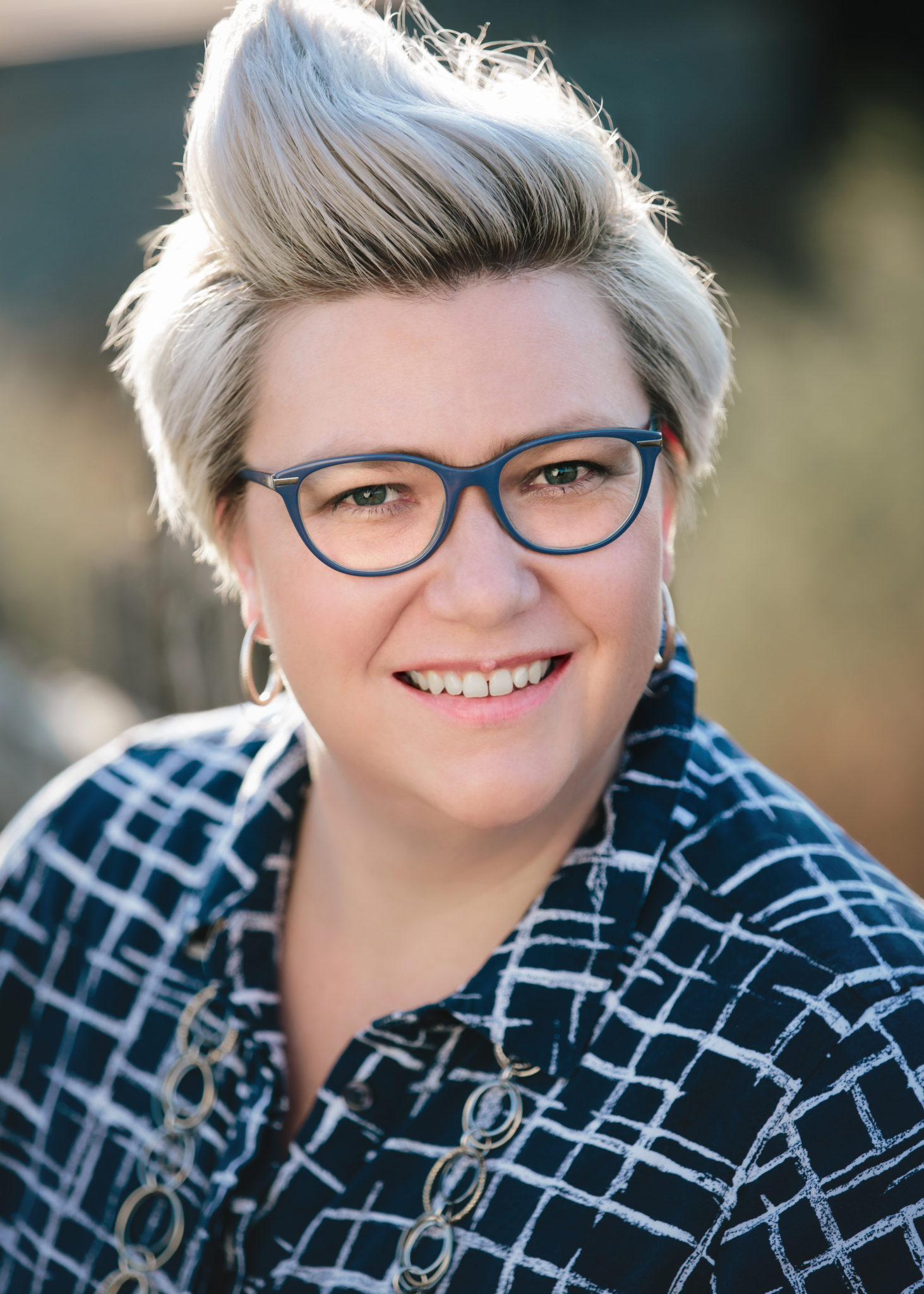
- Johnson in 2017
- Writing career
- Pen name: Liz Isaacson, Jessie Newton
- Genres: Romance, young adult fiction, inspirational, speculative fiction, dystopian
- Website: elanajohnson.com

Elana Johnson is an American author and also writes under the names of Liz Isaacson and Jessie Newton. Her works of young adult fiction and romance have appeared on USA Today's bestseller list three times. Johnson is a Utah-based writer with over 100 works to her credit.

== Background ==
She studied math and science in school and college, and is the technology specialist at a school in Pleasant Grove, Utah. Her husband is a teacher; they have two children. She started writing in late 2007, and published Possession in 2011.

Her From the Query to the Call is a guide for aspiring writers, and she co-founded the QueryTracker blog and also blogs at The League of Extraordinary Writers.

== Writing career ==
=== As Elana Johnson ===
Under the name Elana Johnson, she has written for young adults and adults. The speculative fiction Possession series for young adults includes three dystopian novels, a novella, and a short story prequel; she said in 2011 that she hoped to make readers think for themselves and deliberately had her protagonist question what she was told from the start.

In 2014 she published Elevated, her first contemporary teen romance; Both Elevated and Something About Love, also published in 2014, are verse novels.

Later works include a duology entitled Rift Walkers, three novels in the Elemental romance series, two novels in the Redwood Bay adult contemporary romance series, published in 2016 and 2017, and Echoes of Silence, which is adult fantasy.

=== As Liz Isaacson ===
Under the name Liz Isaacson, she writes inspirational romance novels, including several series, of which her first was the Three Rivers Ranch Romance series, and the novella Starting Over at Steeple Ridge. She also wrote A Dash of Love, based on the 2017 television film.

== Publications as Elana Johnson ==
=== Trilogy ===
Possession trilogy

1. Possession (June 2011)
2. Surrender (June 2012)
3. Abandon (June 2013)
4. Regret (novella) (February 2012)
5. Resist (short story) (December 2011)

=== Verse novels ===
- Elevated (2014)
- Something About Love (2014)

=== Elemental series ===
- Elemental Rush
- Elemental Hunger
- Elemental Release

=== Rift Walkers ===
- Rift
- Mend

=== Redwood Bay ===
- Until Summer Ends (2016)
- Until Winter Breaks (2017)

=== Adult fantasy ===
- Echoes of Silence (2020)

=== Other works ===
- From the Query to the Call
- Open for Love (novella)
- Under Your Spell (anthology)
- All Hallows' Eve (anthology)

== Publications as Liz Isaacson ==
=== Three Rivers Ranch series ===
- Second Chance Ranch (2015)
- Third Time's the Charm (2015)
- Fourth and Long (2016)
- Fifth Generation Cowboy (2016)
- Sixth Street Love Affair (2016)
- The Seventh Sergeant (2016)
- Eight Second Ride (2016)
- The First Lady of Three Rivers Ranch (2016)
- Christmas in Three Rivers (2016)
- Lucky Number Thirteen (2017)
- The Curse of February Fourteenth (2018)
- Fifteen Minutes of Fame (2018)
- Sixteen Steps to Fall in Love (2018)
- The Sleigh on Seventeenth Street (2018)

=== Gold Valley series ===
- Before the Leap (2016)
- After the Fall (2017)
- Through the Mist (2017)
- Between the Reins (2017)
- Over the Moon (2017)
- Under the Bridge (2017)
- Up on the Housetop (2018)
- Around the Bend (2018)

=== Other romance series ===
- Brush Creek Brides (from 2017)
- Buttars Brothers (from 2017)
- Grape Seed Falls (from 2017)
- Christmas in Coral Canyon (from 2018)
- Quinn Valley Ranch (from 2018)
- Last Chance Ranch Romance (from 2019)
- Horseshoe Home Ranch (from 2019)
- Steeple Ridge Romance (from 2019)
- Seven Sons Ranch in Three Rivers (from 2019)
- Shiloh Ridge Ranch in Three Rivers Romance (from 2020)
- Christmas at Whiskey Mountain Lodge (from 2020)

=== Other romance books ===
- Curl Up With A Cowboy (co-authored omnibus, 2016)
- Ticket to Bride (2017)
- Fractured Slipper (Fairy Tale Ink, 2018)
- A Dash of Love (novelization, 2018)
- Take a Cowboy Home for Christmas (omnibus, 2019)
- Her Cowboy Billionaire (omnibus, 2020)
- Cowboy Valentines (2020)
