= Heinkel He 71 =

German monoplane prototype

He 71
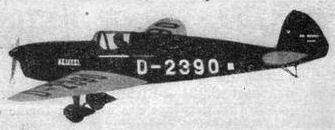

General information
- Type: Single-seat monoplane
- National origin: Germany
- Manufacturer: Heinkel
- Number built: 1

History
- First flight: 1933
- Developed from: Heinkel He 64

The Heinkel He 71 was a German single-seat monoplane, a smaller version of the two-seat Heinkel He 64. A low-wing monoplane with a fixed conventional landing gear, the prototype first flew with an open cockpit and a 60 hp (45 kW) Hirth HM 60 engine. It was later modified with an enclosed cabin and a 78 hp (58 kW) Hirth HM 4 engine. With additional fuel tanks to increase range it was used by German aviator Elly Beinhorn on a flight around Africa.

== Specifications (He 71B) ==
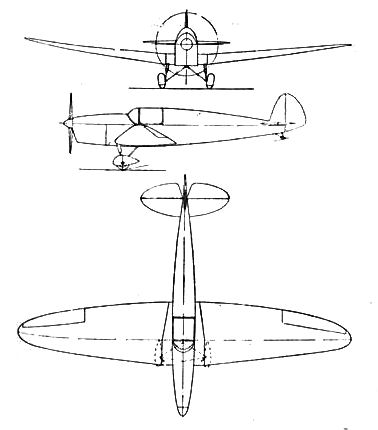
Heinkel He 71 B 3-view drawing from L'Aerophile May 1933

Data from The Illustrated Encyclopedia of Aircraft

General characteristics

- Crew: 1
- Length: 6.97 m (22 ft 10 in)
- Wingspan: 9.50 m (31 ft 2 in)
- Height: 1.70 m (5 ft 7 in)
- Wing area: 12.90 m^{2} (138.9 sq ft)
- Empty weight: 310 kg (683 lb)
- Gross weight: 335 kg (739 lb)
- Max takeoff weight: 679 kg (1,497 lb)
- Powerplant: 1 × Hirth HM 4 , 58 kW (78 hp)

Performance

- Maximum speed: 200 km/h (120 mph, 110 kn)
- Cruise speed: 160 km/h (99 mph, 86 kn)
- Range: 2,410 km (1,500 mi, 1,300 nmi)
- Wing loading: 52.3 kg/m^{2} (10.7 lb/sq ft)
- Power/mass: 0.115
