= Albatros Al 101 =

German trainer aircraft

Al 101
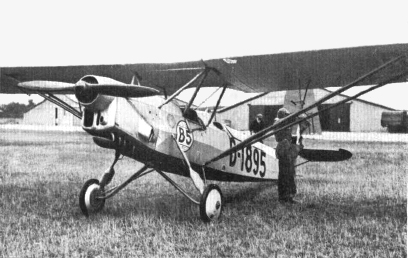

General information
- Type: Trainer
- Manufacturer: Albatros Flugzeugwerke
- Number built: 71

History
- First flight: 1930

The Albatros Al 101 was a 1930s German trainer aircraft. It was a parasol-wing monoplane of conventional configuration, and seated the pilot and instructor in separate, open cockpits.

== Variants ==
- L 101
- L 101W – two examples built as floatplanes
- L 101C
- L 101D

== Specifications (Al 101D) ==
Data from Nowarra 1993

General characteristics

- Crew: 2
- Length: 8.5 m (27 ft 11 in)
- Wingspan: 12.5 m (41 ft 0 in)
- Height: 2.7 m (8 ft 10 in)
- Wing area: 20 m^{2} (220 sq ft)
- Empty weight: 515 kg (1,135 lb)
- Gross weight: 830 kg (1,830 lb)
- Powerplant: 1 × Argus As 8a inverted 4-cyl air-cooled in-line piston engine, 73 kW (98 hp)

Performance

- Maximum speed: 171 km/h (106 mph, 92 kn)
- Range: 670 km (420 mi, 360 nmi)
- Service ceiling: 3,600 m (11,800 ft)
- Rate of climb: 4.2 m/s (830 ft/min)
- Landing speed: 70 km/h (43 mph)

== See also ==
Related lists

- List of Interwar military aircraft
