= Ruhrtaler Ru.3 =

General information
- Type: Advanced single-seat trainer
- National origin: Germany
- Manufacturer: Ruhrtaler Maschinenfabrik, Mülheim
- Designer: Willy Fiedler
- Number built: 1

History
- First flight: Autumn 1936

The Ruhrtaler Ru.3 was a German advanced single-seat trainer designed to take pilots to combat standards. Initial flying tests showed promise but the owner of Ruhrtaler cancelled all aeronautical activity after his son was killed whilst demonstrating the Ru.3 to the Air Ministry.

== Design and development ==
The expansion of the German aircraft industry from 1932 attracted several industrial concerns not previously involved in aviation. Henschel, best known as locomotive builder was one; another, less familiar was the Ruhrtaler Maschinenfabrik Schwarz and Dyckerhoff who built small Diesel engined locomotives for underground use in the mining industry. They became involved in aviation through the enthusiasm of Hanns Schwarz, son of the founder of the firm.

Around 1933, a manoeuvrable high performance single-seat advanced trainer was needed to train fighter pilots for combat. Klemm had been approached but their work progressed very slowly despite the likely order for 180 aircraft. Meanwhile, Ruhrtaler had persuaded Willy Fiedler, a member of the Stuttgart Akaflieg associated with Stuttgart University, to spend a semester designing a competitor. Fiedler and Schwarz invited Tasso Proppe, experienced in glider building, to manage the new workshop. Schwarz himself took charge of the project after Fiedler's return to the Akaflieg and it was not until the autumn of 1936 that the Ru.3 made its first flight, piloted by Hanns Schwarz. Later, other pilots including Proppe and a commercial pilot named Trudel flew the aircraft, which they found fast and very manoeuvrable, as required for combat practice.

On 1 November 1936 representatives of the Reich Air Ministry attended a demonstration of its capabilities. The morning session was a success but during an afternoon exhibition of the Ru.3's flight characteristics Schwarz got into a spin and was killed. His father immediately cancelled all aeronautical activity in his firm. The contract for an advanced trainer had gone to the Focke-Wulf Fw 56 after trials in 1935.

The Ruhrtaler Ru.3 was a single engine, parasol wing aircraft of mixed construction. Its one piece wing was built around a single wooden spar, with a plywood covering forward of it forming a torsion resistant box. Elsewhere the wing was fabric covered. Broad, short ailerons were hinged on an auxiliary spar and extended to the wing tips. In plan the leading edge was swept back at about 9° but the trailing edge was unswept. The tips were elliptical and there was a wide but shallow cut-out to assist the pilot's upward view.

Its fuselage was a steel tube lattice structure, largely fabric covered. Four longerons formed an almost rectangular quadrilateral, with the upper side slightly wider than the underside. Its Argus As 8B four cylinder inverted inline engine was mounted on steel bearers attached to the forward end of the fuselage frame. It produced 99 kW (133 hp) and drove a two blade propeller. Its fuel tank was in the fuselage aft of the engine firewall. The wing was held a little above the fuselage by a short, outward leaning lift strut on each side from the upper longerons to the wing spar and by further struts from the spar at the centre of the wing. The open cockpit placed the pilot on the line of the outer trailing edge, looking forward between wing and fuselage. Both upper and lower fuselage cross sections were rounded and the sides appeared faceted, shaped by stringers. The tapered tailplane and vertical tail had straight edges and rounded tips, with the tailplane mounted at mid-fuselage height. Both fin and rudder were broad at the base, the latter extending to the keel and moving in a small elevator cut-out.

The Ru.3 had a fixed, conventional undercarriage. The spatted mainwheels were mounted on long shock absorbing legs which leant inward to the upper longerons at the same points as the wing struts. Each axle was attached to a pair of V-struts, hinged on the fuselage underside and faired in. There was also a small tailskid. The Ru.3 was unarmed but instead was fitted with a camera for recording success or otherwise in combat simulations with another aircraft.

== Specifications ==
Data from Kens (2011) Dimensions and weights are approximate.

General characteristics

- Crew: One
- Length: 6.8 m (22 ft 4 in)
- Wingspan: 10.0 m (32 ft 10 in)
- Wing area: 13.0 m^{2} (140 sq ft)
- Empty weight: 600 kg (1,323 lb)
- Gross weight: 800 kg (1,764 lb)
- Powerplant: 1 × Argus 8B serie 3 four cylinder inline inverted, 99.2 kW (133.0 hp)135 PS
- Propellers: 2-bladed fixed pitch

Performance

- Maximum speed: 240 km/h (150 mph, 130 kn)
- Cruise speed: 210 km/h (130 mph, 110 kn)
- Service ceiling: 4,600 m (15,100 ft)
- Wing loading: 62 kg/m^{2} (13 lb/sq ft)
- Power/mass: 0.12 kW/kg (0.076 hp/lb)
