= Klemm Kl 32 =

1930s German monoplane

Kl 32
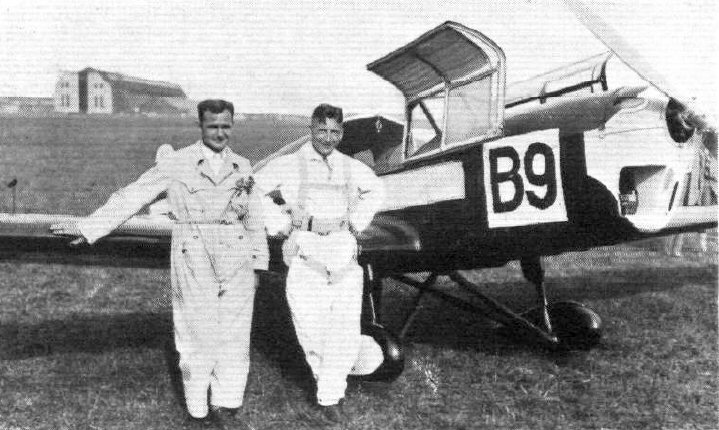

General information
- Type: Competition touring aircraft
- National origin: Germany
- Manufacturer: Klemm
- Designer: Robert Lusser

History
- First flight: 1932

The Klemm Kl 32 was a touring aircraft, developed in Germany in 1932, based on the Klemm Kl 31 as a competitor in the Challenge 1932 touring aircraft competition.

== Design and development ==
Like its predecessor, the KI 32 was a conventional, low-wing cantilever monoplane with fixed, tailskid undercarriage. The Kl 32, however, had a smaller cabin (seating three), and a fuselage built from wood rather than metal.

Eight Kl 32s were entered in the competition, seven by German teams and one by a Swiss team. These were powered by a variety of engines, including the Bramo Sh 14, Argus As 8, de Havilland Gipsy, and Hirth HM 150. Notable German pilots included Robert Lusser (who designed the aircraft), Wolf Hirth, and Reinhold Poss.

Hirth won the short takeoff trial in his Kl 32, and Poss tied for second place in the overall competition with his. Five of the teams flying Kl 32s finished in the top ten in the "rally over Europe" part of the competition, and five of the top ten scores overall were achieved by teams flying Kl 32s.

A Klemm L32-V (VH-UVE, originally D-2299) was flown by Maude Bonney during her Brisbane to Cape Town flight in 1937, a distance of 29,088 km and the first flight from Australia to South Africa.

== Specifications ==
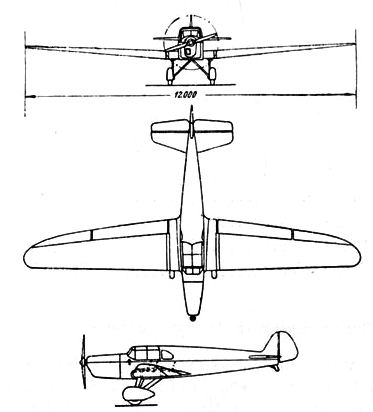
Klemm Kl 32 3-view drawing from L'Aerophile Salon 1932

General characteristics

- Crew: one pilot
- Capacity: two passengers
- Length: 7.20 m (23 ft 8 in)
- Wingspan: 12.00 m (39 ft 4 in)
- Height: 2.05 m (6 ft 9 in)
- Wing area: 17.0 m^{2} (183 sq ft)
- Empty weight: 590 kg (1,300 lb)
- Gross weight: 950 kg (2,090 lb)
- Powerplant: 1 × Bramo Sh 14a , 120 kW (160 hp)

Performance

- Maximum speed: 210 km/h (130 mph, 110 kn)
- Range: 800 km (500 mi, 430 nmi)
- Service ceiling: 4,800 m (15,700 ft)
- Rate of climb: 4.0 m/s (790 ft/min)

== See also ==
- Challenge 1932, for more detailed results of the competition
