= Kuuro =

American electronic music producer and DJ

- Origin: Seattle, Washington, U.S.
- Genres: Trap, dubstep, moombahton, hardstyle
- Years active: 2016–2024
- Labels: Monstercat; RAM Records; Welcome Records; Musical Freedom; Night Mode
- Members: Luke Shipstad
- Past members: Jordin Maikel Post

Luke Shipstad, better known by his stage name Kuuro (/ˈkjʊəroʊ/) (stylised in all caps), is an American DJ and electronic music producer. The Kuuro project was formerly a production duo that also included Dutch producer Jordin Post. They revealed themselves as the producers behind the name in May 2017 during an episode of Monstercat's Call of the Wild radio program.

In April 2020, Post announced his departure from Kuuro to focus on a solo endeavor.

== Discography ==
=== Extended plays ===
- Bad Habits (2019, Monstercat)

=== Singles ===
- "Aamon" (2016, Monstercat)
- "Fade to Black" (2016, Self-released)
- "Savage" (2017, Monstercat)
- "Bandit" (2017, Monstercat)
- "Possession" (2017, Monstercat)
- "Rapture" (featuring MC Mota) (2017, Monstercat)
- "Swarm" (2017, Monstercat)
- "Doji" (2017, Monstercat)
- "Swarm VIP" (2017, Monstercat)
- "Omen" (2018, Monstercat)
- "Afraid of the Dark" (featuring Sophiya) (2018, Monstercat)
- "Knockin'" (2018, Monstercat)
- "Take Me Down" (featuring Bianca) (2018, Monstercat)
- "1000 Cuts" (with Clockvice) (2018, Monstercat)
- "What U Wanna Do" (featuring Spencer Ludwig) (2018, Monstercat)
- "Inferno" (2019, Self-released)
- "Replicant" (with Delta Heavy) (2019, RAM Records, Only in Dreams)
- "Trigger" (2019, Monstercat)
- "Can We Be Free" (2019, Monstercat)
- "Fallout" (2019, Welcome Records)
- "All Night" (with Clockvice) (2019, Monstercat)
- "Greed" (with Zok) (2020, Musical Freedom)
- "Slap!" (2020, Night Mode)
- "Warning Signs" (with Hex Cougar) (2020, Monstercat)
- "She's Got a Gun" (featuring McCall) (2020, Monstercat)
- "Crash & Burn" (2020, Monstercat)
- "Don't Stop" (2020, Monstercat)
- "Close To Hell" (with Goja) (2021, Monstercat)
- "Can't Say" (featuring Syon) (2021, Monstercat)
- "Collapse" (with Hayve and featuring imallryt) (2021, Monstercat)
- "Waiting" (featuring Bianca) (2021, Monstercat)
- "D.E.A.L" (with Psycho Boys Club) (2021, Monstercat)
- "BTFU" (with AnthonyZ) (2022, Kuuro Music)
- "Break" (2022, Nightmode)
- "Damage" (2022, Monstercat)
- "Alive" (with SKUM) (2023, Monstercat)
- "Snakes And Ladders" (with Bianca) (2023, Monstercat)

=== Remixes and covers ===
- Galantis – "Louder, Harder, Better" (Kuuro Remix) (2016)
- What So Not and Burns – "Trust" (Kuuro Remix) (2017)
- Boombox Cartel – "Dem Fraid" (Kuuro Remix) [featuring Taranchyla] (2017)
- Post Malone – "Better Now" (Kuuro Cover) (2019)
- Zedd and Katy Perry – "365" (Kuuro Remix) (2019)
