= Possessed =

Possessed may refer to:

== Possession ==
- Possession (disambiguation), having some degree of control over something else
  - Spirit possession, whereby gods, demons, animas, or other disincarnate entities may temporarily take control of a human body
    - Demonic possession, spirit possession by a malevolent entity

== Film and television ==
- Possessed (1931 film), a 1931 drama starring Clark Gable and Joan Crawford
- Possessed (1947 film), a 1947 film noir starring Joan Crawford
- The Possessed (1965 film), a 1965 Italian mystery film
- The Possessed (TV series), a 1969 British drama television series
- La Endemoniada (The Possessed) a 1974 Spanish horror film directed by Amando de Ossorio, a.k.a. Demon Witch Child
- The Possessed (1977 film), a 1977 American horror film directed by Jerry Thorpe
- Junoon (1978 film), a.k.a. Possessed, 1978 Indian epic
- Possessed (1983 film), a 1983 Hong Kong horror film
- Possessed II, a 1984 Hong Kong horror film
- The Possessed (1988 film), a 1988 French film
- Possessed (2000 film), a 2000 TV-movie starring Timothy Dalton
- Possessed (2006 film), a 2006 Malaysian horror film
- The Possessed (2009 film), a 2009 American horror film based on a true story
- Living Death (film), a 2009 South Korean horror film also known as Possessed
- Soul (South Korean TV series), a 2009 South Korean TV series also known as Possessed
- Possessed (TV series), a 2019 South Korean TV series
- The Possessed (2021 film)

== Literature ==
- "The Possessed" (short story), a 1951 short story by Arthur C. Clarke
- Demons (Dostoevsky novel), an 1872 novel by Fyodor Dostoyevsky sometimes also called The Possessed
  - The Possessed (play), a 1959 play by Albert Camus, adapted from Dostoyevsky's novel
- The Possessed: Adventures with Russian Books and the People Who Read Them (2010), a book by Elif Batuman named after Dostoevsky's novel
- Possessed (novel), a 1939 novel by Witold Gombrowicz
- The Possessed (novel), a Russian novel by Fyodor Dostoevsky also translated as Demons or The Devils
- The Possessed (comics), a limited series written by Geoff Johns and Kris Grimminger, with artwork by Liam Sharp

== Music ==
- Possessed (band), American death metal band
- Possessed (Gojira album)
- Possessed (Kode IV album), a 1990 album by the band Kode IV
- Possessed (Venom album)
- "Possessed", a song by Sasami from Blood on the Silver Screen

== Other uses ==
- The Possessed (comics), 2003
- Possessed (roller coaster), a Steel Impulse Coaster at Dorney Park formerly referred to as Voodoo

== See also ==
- Repossessed (film), a parody/spoof film from 1991 starring Leslie Nielsen
- Repossession, a financial institution taking back property
- The Dispossessed, a 1974 utopian science fiction novel by Ursula K. Le Guin
