= Winifred Spooner =

English aviator (1900–1933)

Winifred Evelyn Spooner
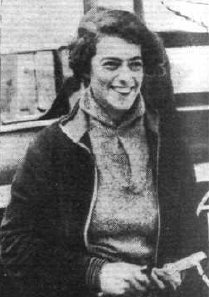
- Born: 11 September 1900; Woolwich, Kent, England
- Died: 13 January 1933 (aged 32); Leicestershire
- Occupation: Aviator

Winifred Evelyn Spooner (11 September 1900 – 13 January 1933) was an English aviator of the 1920s and 1930s, and the winner of the Harmon Trophy as the world's outstanding female aviator of 1929. In 1930 she was described as "the finest woman pilot in the world". She died aged 32 from pneumonia.

== Early life and education ==
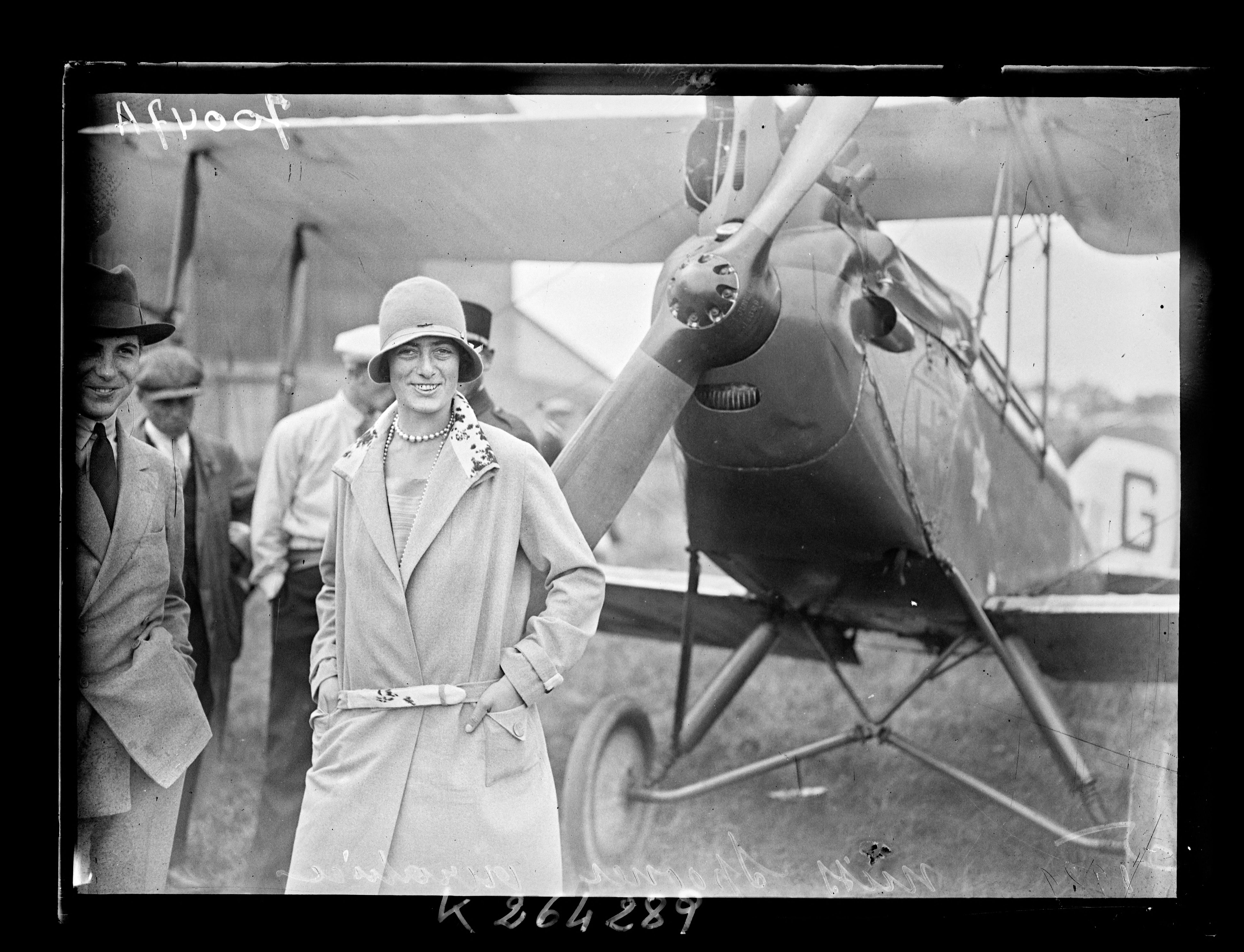
Spooner at the Challenge International de Tourisme 1929

Winifred Spooner was born on 11 September 1900 in Woolwich in Kent, to Annie (née Kirk) and Major Walter B. Spooner, a fifth child and the only girl in the family. Her brothers made her learn to swim, a skill which later saved her life. She attended Sherborne Girls in Dorset between 1916 and 1918. Both her parents died young, her father in 1901 and her mother on Armistice Day, 11 November 1918 from influenza. She attended the University of Reading to study domestic science but did not stay there long. Spooner then worked at a YMCA canteen in Cologne, Germany for a short time. Her youngest brother was a pilot and this inspired her to take up flying as well.

After she received pilot's licence No. 8137 from the London Aeroplane Club in September 1927, she became a competitor in sports aviation. She was the 16th woman in Britain to receive a licence. She also received an Aviator's Certificate in the United States, dated 21 August 1931 and signed by Orville Wright.

Winifred's brothers, Tony and Frank, had leased farmland and stables near Folly Court in Wokingham, Berkshire, where they schooled and sold polo-ponies, hunters and steeplechasers. They called their enterprise The Polo Farm. During the First World War Frank had served as a cavalry officer in India, and from 1917 to 1918 had been the head of the equestrian school. Winifred's other brother, Captain Hugh "Tony" Spooner, who served in the 19th King George's Own Lancers, married to Glenda Spooner, was Superintendent of Flying Operations and Chief Pilot to the Misr-Airwork Company of Egypt. He was killed in a flying accident in a sandstorm in Egypt on 15 March 1935.

There was a field on the farm big enough upon which to land a light aircraft, so Winifred built a wooden hangar and moved her Moth from Stag Lane. During this period Winifred, Hugh and Frank lived at 4 South Drive in Wokingham, with Frank's daughter Vivian. Winifred continued her air-taxi service, charging £4 an hour or one shilling a mile, covering Britain and France, and gave flying lessons. She also bought a car; Wokingham locals recall her being one of the first woman drivers in the area. Some time later she moved to Scott's Farm near Bearwood, now part of Woosehill.

== Achievements ==
In July 1928 she took the 3rd place in the seventh King's Cup Race and won the Siddeley Trophy as the first Aeroplane Club aviator to cross the line, flying DH.60 Cirrus I Moth.

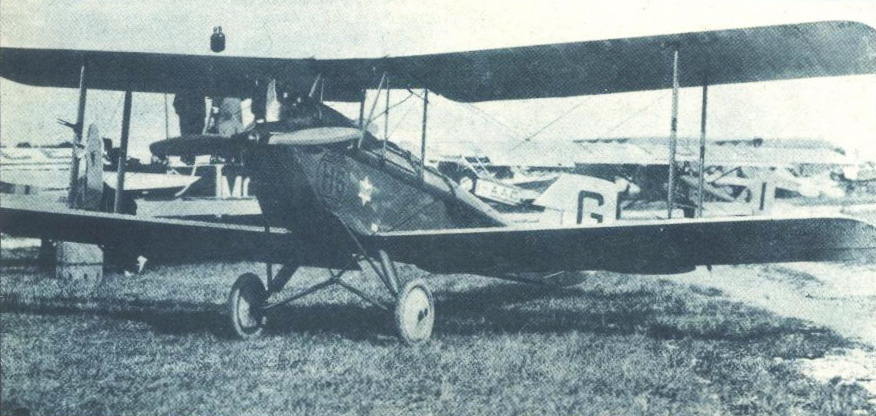
The de Havilland DH.60 Moth of Miss Spooner in the Challenge International de Tourisme 1929

In 1929 she finished fifth in the King's Cup Race, and won the Harmon Trophy as the world's outstanding female aviator. She also took 10th place in the International Tourist Plane Contests Challenge.

In 1930 she was a member of the British team at the International Tourist Plane Contest Challenge 1930 between 16 July and 8 August in Berlin, Germany, finishing the rally seventh overall in her De Havilland Gipsy Moth. She completed the whole contest in 4th position. In late August of the same year she was fourth in the handicapped race Giro Aereo d'Italia in Italy.

On 5 December 1930, accompanied by Captain Edwards, she set out to prove that South Africa could be reached within 5 days by flying day and night. After 16 hours, while Captain Edwards was flying the aircraft and Winifred was asleep, the plane crashed into the sea off the coast of Belmonte Calabro in complete darkness. The plane losing height was attributed to a mechanical failure. As Captain Edwards was quite badly injured, Winifred left him sitting on the wooden fuselage and swam ashore "6 strokes at a time"; the ditching was about two miles offshore. She then alerted local fishermen who set out to rescue Captain Edwards and the plane.

She participated in three out of four F.A.I – International Tourist Plane Contests – Challenge 1929, Challenge 1930, Challenge 1932 – as one of only two women; being one of the top contestants and taking 10th place in 1929 and 4th place in 1930. In 1932 she occupied the 4th position after technical trials, but she decided to withdraw after a forced landing, caused by a sabotage on her fuel.

In 1931, she took the fifth place in the King's Cup Race and became the first British woman to earn her living as a private owner's personal pilot, flying the air racer and MP, Sir William Lindsay Everard, all over Britain, Europe, Turkey and the Middle East.

In June 1931, Spooner persuaded fellow pilot Amy Johnson to join her at Sherborne Girls School to raise funds to build a swimming pool at the school by offering flights for a fee, and reminisced that had she not learned to swim, she would not have survived her 1930 sea crash.

She is reported to have crashed an aircraft in Cleator Moor in Cumberland, England. The date is unknown but the plane was taken to the Mill Yard, and Spooner is reported to have suffered no more than tattered stockings.

== Death ==
In January 1933, Spooner, who was never ill, caught a cold while at Ratcliffe Aerodrome, Leicestershire, which rapidly worsened and she took to her bed. Pneumonia set in on the following day and the local doctor sent for a specialist from Nottingham. Unfortunately, because of thick fog, the specialist lost his way and the oxygen he was bringing, which might have saved her life, arrived too late: Spooner suffered a heart attack, and, despite an injection of strychnine, died the next day, on 13 January. The bad luck that had dogged Spooner all her life, and which had cost her numerous trophies and earned her the nickname 'bad luck Wimpey', had followed her to the end.

Her remains were taken to St. Swithin's Church at Hinton Parva, near Swindon in Wiltshire for burial beside her parents. The Rev. W. Lucas Stubbs, the Rev. C.F. Burgess and the Rev. Gordon Soames conducted the service, and in addition to members of her family, those present included: Captain Tregona representing the Italian Government; the Italian Air Minister, General Italo Balbo; Commander H.E. Perrin, Secretary of the Royal Aero Club; and her former employer, Lindsay Everard. A memorial service was held four days later at St. Peter's in Eaton Square, London. Many attended, including Viscountess Elibank; Lt.-Col. F.C. Shelmerdine, Director of Civil Aviation; Lady Acton and Kathleen Countess of Drogheda representing the Women's Committee, Air League.

== Commemoration ==
A bronze bust of Spooner, created by Donald Gilbert, was unveiled on 30 May 1934 by Lindsay Everard MP at the headquarters of the Women's Automobile and Sports Association, presented by an anonymous donor.

== Sherborne Memorial Scholarship ==
In 1936, Spooner's close friend, Dugald Macpherson, founded a memorial scholarship to her memory at Sherborne School for Girls.
