= Possessors =

Fictional race

Possessors is a fictional extra-dimensional race appearing in American comic books published by Marvel Comics. They first appeared in Strange Tales #118 (March 1964).

== Fictional character biography ==
The Possessors sought to conquer Earth but were defeated by Doctor Strange.
