= Possession (trilogy) =

Young adult dystopian novel series written by Elana Johnson

- First editions
- Possession; Surrender; Abandon
- Author: Elana Johnson
- Country: United States
- Language: English
- Genre: Young adult novel
- Publisher: Simon Pulse
- Published: June 2011 - June 2013
- Media type: Print, e-book

Possession is a young adult dystopian novel trilogy written by Elana Johnson and published by Simon Pulse. The first book in the series, Possession, was published on 7 June 2011, and was followed by Surrender (5 June 2012) and Abandon (4 June 2013). The series follows Vi, a rebellious teen girl who is unwilling to follow the rules set out by the oppressive 'Thinkers' yet unable to leave her prospective mate Zenn behind. After the release of Possession Johnson issued a 20-page short story entitled Resist, which serves as a prequel to the series.

== Reception ==
=== Surrender ===
School Library Journal said that Surrender "can stand on its own though the sometimes convoluted plot and references to characters introduced in the first book can be confusing to those unfamiliar with it", and compared it to the Hunger Games and Uglies.

== Synopsis ==
=== Possession ===
Vi is a beautiful and rebellious young teen living in a world where people are separated into "Goodies", people who live in the Goodlands and give up their free will in exchange for safety, and "Baddies", those who are willing to live in pollution and danger but retain control over their will and thoughts. While Vi mostly abides by the rules, she will occasionally break a few of them- especially when she is around her approved mate Zenn. Girls are not allowed to mingle freely with boys, but Vi decides that she will take the opportunity to walk alone with Zenn and possibly even kiss him, as she figures that since he is her future mate that the rules will not matter as much in the long run. This ends up being far from the case and she attracts the attention of the oppressive "Thinkers", who control everything that the Goodies do. They place her in prison, where she meets Jag, an equally rebellious teen boy that Vi finds herself falling for. The two of them manage to break out of the prison with the intention of joining the Baddies' rebellion, but Vi is unwilling to leave Zenn alone with the Thinkers and is willing to fight against them in order to keep him safe.

=== Surrender ===
Surrender is told from the viewpoint of the "Baddie" Raine, the daughter of the Director of Freedom. She is roomed with Vi, who has managed to escape the oppressive rule of the Thinkers, in accordance with a request by her father. As Vi was extensively brainwashed, Raine's father cannot trust Vi completely and he wants his daughter to monitor Vi's activity and report everything back to him. He is especially curious about Vi's potential special abilities. As Raine watches Vi, she also begins to fall in love with Gunner, who has had a crush on her for a long time.

=== Abandon ===
In Abandon everything comes to a head: Vi finally makes a choice between Jag and Zenn, which could prove to have far reaching repercussions. At the same time, the group must find a way to defeat the Thinkers once and for all, something that is made more difficult by the fact that the resistance has a traitor in their midst.

== Characters ==
=== Violet/Vi ===
Vi is a rebellious teen living with her mother after her father vanished, soon followed by her sister. After being imprisoned for touching her fiance, she meets Jag Barque, the leader of a large band of rebels. She joins the rebels, using her latent Thinker-like abilities to turn the tides against the Thinkers for good. She is captured and brainwashed, but ultimately has this undone with the help of Raine Hightower and the rebels.

=== Jag Barque ===
Jag is the leader of a rebellion against the Thinker government. He has the ability to force anyone to do what he says. By the end of the series he gets into a relationship with Vi. Despite his young age, he leads the rebellion.

=== Zenn Bower ===
Zenn is the former fiance of Vi, and a member of the society's government. He struggles with questions of where his loyalty lies; he is aligned with the rebellion, but Vi's father, a high-ranking Thinker, makes him question this. He ultimately falls in love with another rebel named Indy, and he dies at the end of Abandon. A Thinker, Zenn has the ability to control the wind.

=== Raine Hightower ===
The daughter of the ruler of a city, Raine is responsible for leading a group of elite teen Thinkers. She is in love with Gunner, a pilot, and her best friend is Cannon. Raine helps Vi, her brainwashed roommate who she is to spy on, escape. She is brainwashed into thinking she is 'Arena Locke', before the rebellion helps undo the brainwashing.

== Books ==
1. Possession (2011)
2. Surrender (2012)
3. Abandon (2013)

=== Short stories ===
- Resist (2011, released as 0.5 of the series)
- Insider Information (2011, released as 0.5 of the series)
- Regret (2012, released as 1.5 of the series)
