= Possession Island =

Possession Island may refer to:

- Possession Island (Namibia), on the Skeleton Coast of Africa, largest within the Penguin Islands
- Possession Island (Queensland), in the Torres Strait, Australia
- Possession Island, Antarctica, in the Possession Islands group
- Île de la Possession, a French subantarctic territory
- "Possession Island", a song by Gorillaz featuring Beck from their 2023 album Cracker Island

== See also ==
- Possession Islands, Antarctica
