= Raab-Katzenstein RK.25 =

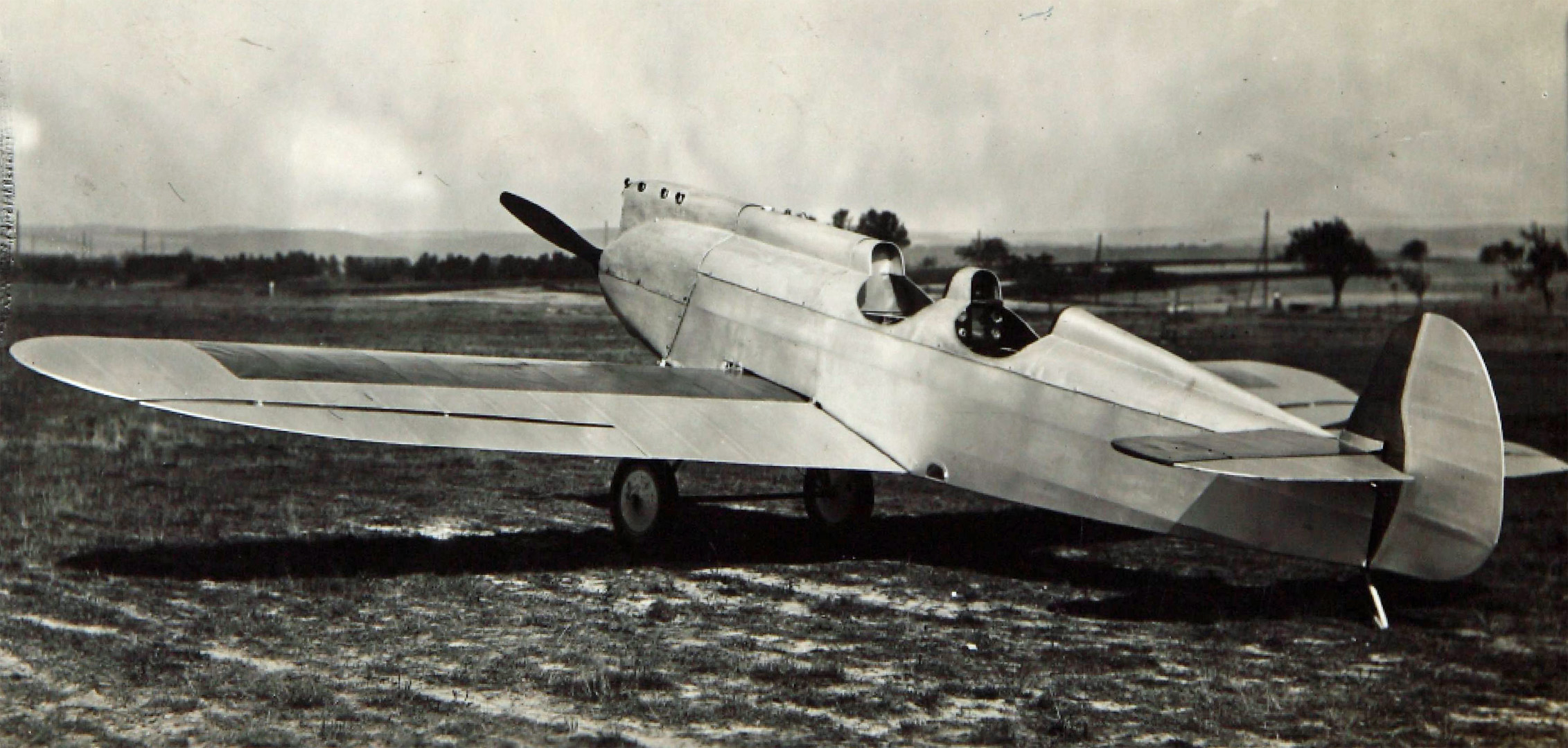
- The first RK.25, factory fresh

General information
- Type: Sport and trainer aircraft
- National origin: Germany
- Manufacturer: Raab-Katzenstein Flugwerk
- Designer: Paul Hall and Richard Bauer
- Number built: 3

History
- First flight: 1928-9

The Raab-Katzenstein RK.25 was a two-seat, low wing cantilever monoplane aircraft designed and built in Germany in the 1920s for fast touring. Three were built and one had some success in a 1928 international contest. Another was later re-engined and provided with cabin accommodation.

== Design and development ==
The RK.25 was noted by contemporaries for its speed, aerodynamic cleanness, its use of new light alloys and, with a range of 2,000–2,400 km (1,200–1,500 mi; 1,100–1,300 nmi), its suitability for long distance touring. It was a low wing, cantilever monoplane with an engine choice between an 80 hp (60 kW) Cirrus II or a 90 hp (67 kW) Cirrus III, both four-cylinder upright air-cooled inlines. Success in the upcoming first Challenge International de Tourisme would offer publicity and its points system benefited designs with high performance, high structural strength and low weight.

Its wings were trapezoidal in plan, though with long, rounded tips. Their thickness reduced outwards, largely from below, contributing to the significant dihedral. Structurally, the wings were wooden, each with two longerons which were joined into a box spar by plywood skin out to three-quarter span; this appears dark in the photograph above. The rest of the surfaces, including the unbalanced ailerons which occupied about half the span, were silk covered. The ailerons had frames of elektron, a recently developed magnesium alloy.

The RK.25's upright Cirrus engine was neatly cowled in weight-saving elektron, following the upper cylinders to minimise their obstruction of the pilot's forward view. The fuselage had a welded steel tube structure with fabric-covered sides and underside and a curved top which continued the narrow upper engine fairing dorsally. There were two open cockpits in tandem, one occupied by the navigator over the rear wing and the other by the pilot, behind the trailing edge.

Its tail was conventional, with wooden structures and tapered, round-tipped surfaces. The elevators and the leading edges of the rudder (there was no fin) were ply-covered boxes, with silk elsewhere. The tailplane's angle of incidence could be adjusted on the ground for trimming but its elevators were unbalanced. A large balanced rudder reached down to the keel and worked in an elevator cut-out.

The RK.25 had a traditional fixed undercarriage with a track of 1.40 m (55 in), its mainwheels on a single axle supported by a pair of V-struts from the lower fuselage. The tops of the forward V-strut members were joined transversely by a beam, free to slide vertically between pairs of fuselage members but restrained by sets of rubber rings which also circled the wing structure as it crossed the fuselage.

The second RK.25 (registered D-1701) was fitted with a Cirrus III engine, the improved cylinder head cooling of which required a slightly wider and raised cowling. It also had raised cockpit sides.

In 1932 the first prototype (D-1489) was rebuilt as the RK.25/32 for the Challenge International de Tourisme 1932. This had an enclosed cabin with large side and upper glazing panels, inboard Ksoll slotted, camber-changing flaps and independent, faired undercarriage legs. It was powered by a 93 kW (125 hp) Argus As 8 air-cooled, four cylinder, inverted inline engine and had a maximum speed about 240 km/h (150 mph).

== Operational history ==
The date of the RK.25's first flight is not known, though the prototype was registered in September 1928. It and the second example competed in the 1929 Challenge; the latter, with its more powerful engine and flown by John Carberry, came third.

A third and final RK.25 was registered to Luftfahrtverein Ruhrgau (Ruhrgau flying club) of Essen in 1933.

The RK.25/32 took part in the 1932 Challenge, though it was late and only admitted after the payment of a fine. It performed badly in the tests before the tour, coming last of forty-one and engine problems forced it out of the tour at Rimini.

== Variants ==
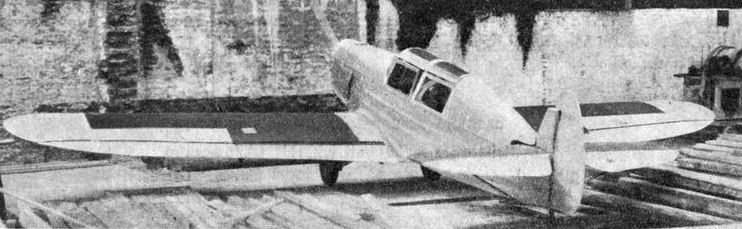
Raab Katzenstein RK 25/32 photo from L'Aérophile Salon 1932

RK.25
Original version with open cockpits and Cirrus II/III engine. Three built.
RK.25/32
1932 version with enclosed cabin and Argus 8 engine. One converted from RK.25.

== Specifications RK.25, (Cirrus II) ==
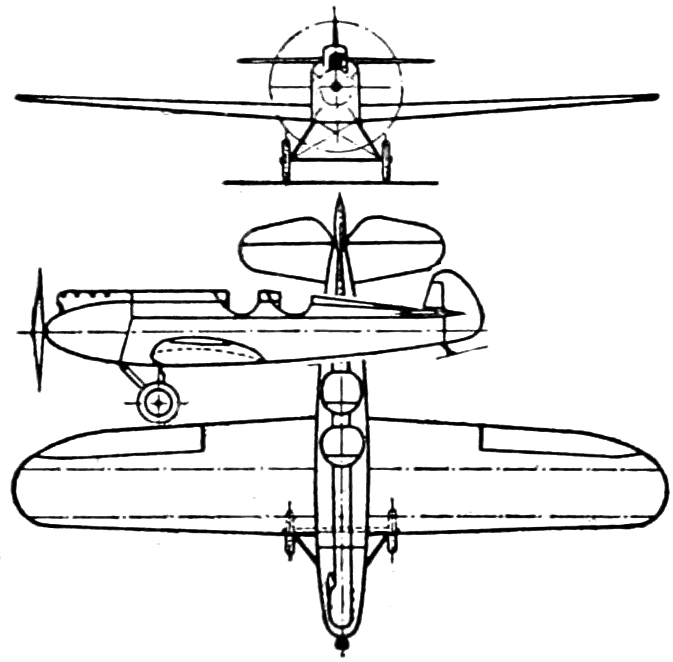
Raab-Katzenstein RK.25 3-view drawing from Aero Digest October 1929

Data from Les Ailes, February 1929

General characteristics

- Crew: Two
- Length: 6.48 m (21 ft 3 in)
- Wingspan: 9.30 m (30 ft 6 in)
- Height: 2.18 m (7 ft 2 in)
- Wing area: 13 m^{2} (140 sq ft)
- Empty weight: 295 kg (650 lb)
- Gross weight: 700 kg (1,543 lb)
- Fuel capacity: 300 L (66 imp gal; 79 US gal)
- Powerplant: 1 × Cirrus II 4-cylinder upright air-cooled inline, 60 kW (80 hp) at 2000 rpm
- Propellers: 2-bladed

Performance

- Maximum speed: 200 km/h (120 mph, 110 kn) (185 km/h (115 mph; 100 kn) according to NACA 1930 report)
- Cruise speed: 185 km/h (115 mph, 100 kn)
- Range: 2,400 km (1,500 mi, 1,300 nmi)
- Service ceiling: 3,500 m (11,500 ft)
- Time to altitude: 6 min to 1,000 m (3,300 ft)
