= Possession (Kuuro song) =

Single by Kuuro

from the album Monstercat Uncaged Vol. 2
- Released: 19 May 2017
- Genre: Moombahton
- Length: 3:34
- Label: Monstercat
- Producer(s): Jordin Post; Luke Shipstad

Kuuro singles chronology
"Bandit" (2017)	"Possession" (2017)	"Rapture" (2017)

"Possession" is a song by Dutch-American electronic music duo Kuuro. Canadian record label Monstercat released it on May 19, 2017. The song was originally released as part of the compilation album Monstercat Uncaged Vol. 2, released August 25, 2017. It was later featured as part of Monstercat's Best of 2017 compilation album, released on December 18, 2017.

== Background and release ==
Although the duo attempted to remain anonymous since the release of their debut single "Aamon", they decided to reveal themselves as Luke Shipstad, one half of electronic music duo Suspect 44, and Jordin Post, otherwise known as Juventa. Prior to the reveal, Reddit user FabulousViking had correctly guessed their identities. The duo confirmed their identities in an article from the magazine Billboard, with the duo writing that when they started the Kuuro project, they wanted to have their own distinguished sound, further stating that "We spent about a year working on it before we even released any music. We wanted to truly refine the project." The announcement was coincided with, and was used to promote, the release of their latest track at the time, "Possession".

On May 19, 2017, the song was released as a digital download on international digital stores through Canadian record label Monstercat, as well as being released through various music streaming services. "Possession" was featured on the compilation album titled Monstercat Uncaged Vol. 2 released on August 25, 2017. The song was later featured on the yearly best-of compilation album titled Monstercat: Best of 2017 released on December 18, 2017.

== Critical reception ==
"Possession" was well received by most critics, with most noting the song as reminiscent of Skrillex's remix of "Red Lips", originally produced by GTA. Patrick Shipstad of Billboard described it was more suited for a large festival crowd "looking to rumble", writing "with a cinematic open and lots of heavy boom, it's got the kind of mean bass face that screams festival tune." Writing for Your EDM, Landon Fleury called the song one of the duo's most "heavy-hitting song to date", writing that "Possession" was "bigger and wilder than ever before" when compared to the duos previous releases. EDM Sauce's Steven Jacobs called it the best track by the duo at the time, writing that the song built "with a big, but beautiful production, ultimately culminating for a hard and heavy-hitting metallic moombahton drop." In his review of the song for Noiseporn, Lennon Cihak praised the song, stating that the duo had "taken the moombahton genre and made it their own with the extraordinarily cunning percussion and impeccable sound design." While covering Kuuro in an Under the Radar segment for EDM.com, Cihak noted the song as his personal favourite song from the duo.

== Track listing ==
Digital download – Single
No.	Title	Length
1.	"Possession"	3:34
Total length:		3:34

== Release history ==
Region	Date	Format	Version	Label	Ref.
Worldwide	May 19, 2017	Digital download	"Possession"	Monstercat	
Worldwide	August 25, 2017	Digital download	Monstercat Uncaged Vol. 2	Monstercat	
Worldwide	December 18, 2017	Digital download	Monstercat: Best of 2017	Monstercat	
