= Breda Ba.33 =

Italian light sport aircraft

Ba.33
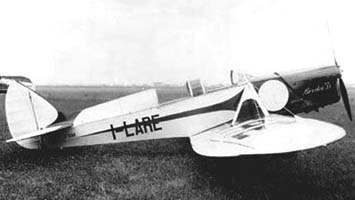
- Ba.33

General information
- Type: Light sport aircraft
- Manufacturer: Breda
- Designer: Ing Cesare Pallavicino

History
- First flight: 1930

The Breda Ba.33 was an Italian light sport aircraft designed and built by the Breda company.

== Design and development ==
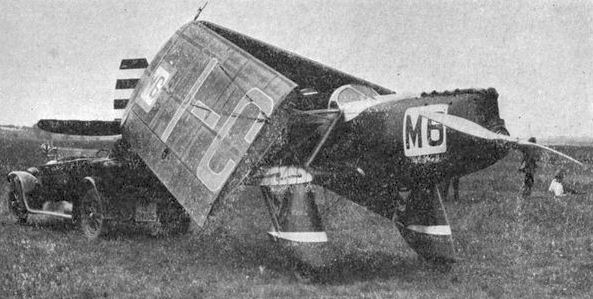
Breda Ba.33 photo from L'Aerophile Salon 1932

Ing Cesare Pallavicino of the Breda company led the design and development of the Ba.33. The first version, the Ba.33 Serie 1, was a two-seat low-wing monoplane with external bracing between the wings and the fuselage. It was powered by an 89-kilowatt (120-horsepower) de Havilland Gipsy III four-cylinder air-cooled inline engine. Later, two versions of the Ba.33 Serie 2 appeared, one with the de Havilland Gipsy engine and another with a Colombo engine.

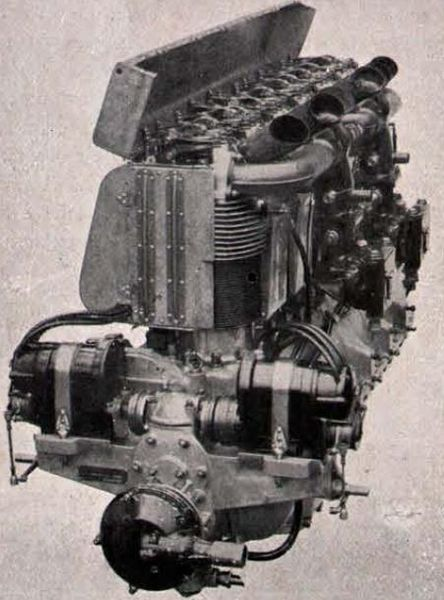
Colombo S.63 engine

Breda also developed a single-seat version of the aircraft, the Ba.33S; differing from the Ba.33 in being a single-seater and having an enclosed cockpit and a more powerful engine, the 97 kW (130.08 hp) Colombo S63 engine.

== Operational history ==
After the Ba.33 first flew in 1930, the aircraft and its variants proved to be a very successful series of touring and racing aircraft during the 1930s. In 1931, a Ba.33 won the Giro aereo d'Italia ("Air Tour of Italy") race.

Ba.33s were the equipment of the Italian team for the International Touring Competition in 1932, with which also Winifred Spooner entered the contest. Ambrogio Colombo was a leader in the contest after technical trials. However, two Bredas crashed on 23 August 1932, due to weak wing construction (one mechanic died bailing out), and Italy decided to withdraw all the Italian teams from the contest.

== Variants ==
Ba.33 Serie 1
Original two-seat version with 89-kilowatt (120-horsepower) de Havilland Gipsy III engine.
Ba.33 Serie 2
Two versions, one offered with a de Havilland Gipsy engine and one with a 130 hp (97 kW) Colombo S.63 engine.
Ba.33S
Improved single-seat version with enclosed cockpit and 140 hp (104 kW) Colombo S.63 engine.

== Operators ==
Japan

- Mainichi Shimbun a Japanese newspaper.

== Specifications (Ba.33 Serie 1) ==
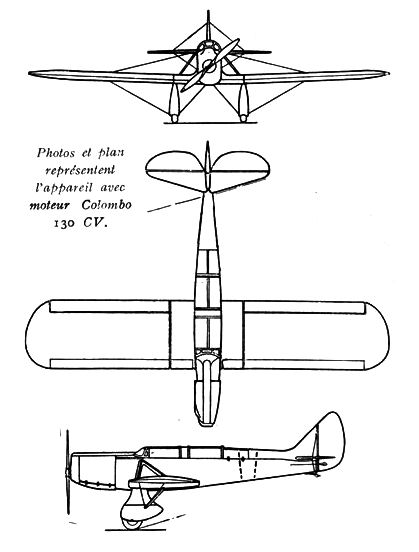
Breda Ba.33 3-view drawing from L'Aerophile Salon 1932

Data from Italian Civil and Military aircraft 1930-1945

General characteristics

- Crew: 2
- Length: 6.78 m (22 ft 3 in)
- Wingspan: 9.40 m (30 ft 10 in)
- Wing area: 15.00 m^{2} (161.5 sq ft)
- Empty weight: 429 kg (946 lb)
- Gross weight: 828 kg (1,826 lb)
- Powerplant: 1 × de Havilland Gipsy III 4-cyl. inverted in-line, air-cooled piston engine, 89 kW (120 hp)
- Powerplant: 1 × Colombo S.63 6-cyl. air-cooled in-line piston engine,, 100 kW (140 hp) (Serie 2 and Ba.33S)

Performance

- Maximum speed: 230 km/h (143 mph, 124 kn)
- Cruise speed: 200 km/h (124 mph, 108 kn)
- Stall speed: 85 km/h (53 mph, 46 kn)
- Range: 1,800 km (1,120 mi, 970 nmi)
- Service ceiling: 7,000 m (22,960 ft)
- Rate of climb: 4.44 m/s (874 ft/min)
- Time to altitude: 13,120 ft (3,998.98 m) in 15 minutes

== See also ==
Aircraft of comparable role, configuration, and era

- Mitsubishi Ki-15 Karigane
