= Heinkel He 64 =

1933 German sports aircraft

He 64
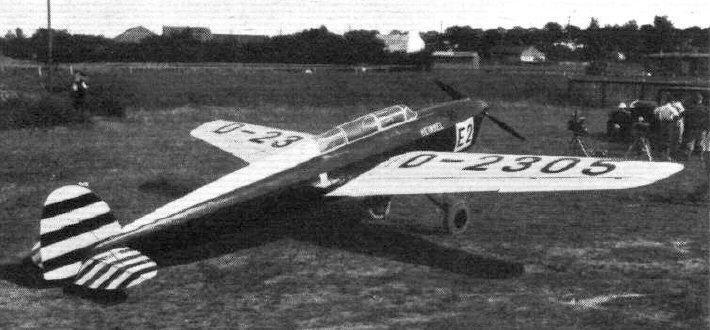

General information
- Type: Sports plane
- National origin: Germany
- Manufacturer: Heinkel
- Designer: Siegfried and Walter Günter
- Number built: 7

History
- First flight: 1933
- Developed into: Heinkel He 71

The Heinkel He 64 was a sports plane designed by the German aeronautical engineers Siegfried and Walter Günter and produced by the aircraft manufacturer Heinkel. It was specifically built to participate in the touring plane championships of 1933.

The He 64 was a sleek, low-wing monoplane of conventional configuration, being furnished with fixed, tailskid undercarriage and a well-furnished and relatively spacious cockpit. It was outfitted with a single-spar trapezoidal-shaped slotted folding wing; it was the first such wing of its type. The automated slots permitted the aircraft to fly at steep climb angles and relatively low landing speeds. Both the wing and fuselage were primarily composed of wood. A variety of engines could be fitted to power the He 64 including the de Havilland Gipsy III, Hirth HM 504A-2, Hirth HM 506, and Argus As 8R.

First flown in 1933, the type promptly entered several air races; notably, it took the first three places in the 7,363 km (4,601 mi) Europa Rundflug ("Rally over Europe"). While quickly overshadowed by other developments, the aircraft was used for testing purposes for a while. At least one aircraft was alleged still active into the early 1950s.

== Development ==
During the early 1930s, Heinkel decided to produce an aircraft that would be both capable of high speed flight and would specifically fulfil the competition requirements of the 3rd International Touring Contest. The resulting aircraft, the He 64 would considerably surpass the sustained top speeds of prior competition aircraft; while the organisers had anticipated a travel time of roughly six days to complete a roughly 7,500 km course, the He 64 was able to fly that distance in only three days. Despite this considerable performance jump, ample attention was paid to design aspects such as comfort and safety as well.

The He 64 was a twin-seat cantilever low-wing monoplane of wooden construction. The cockpit, which seated a crew of two, was fairly spacious; both the pilot and passenger were provided with adjustable seats, complete with arm rests, as well as a well-equipped instrumentation panel. The passenger's position could be outfitted with detachable dual flight controls that could be readily disconnected by the pilot. Relatively easy egress from the aircraft was achieved via a sliding transparent canopy that provided protection from the elements and good external visibility. The pilot had a high degree of visibility in all directions, including downwards. Communication between the pilot and passenger was atypically good due to the presence of a talking tube. A variety of modern safety measures were incorporated into the aircraft, including the presence of fire extinguishers, life jackets, parachutes, a first aid kit, restraint belts, and fireproof doping.

The structure of the oval cross-section fuselage largely consisted of bulkheads and longerons. The forwardmost bulkhead directly attached to the steel tube engine mounting; this specific bulkhead functioned as a firewall. To prevent vibration generated by the engine from travelling through to the rest of the aircraft, rubber buffers were present. The exterior of the fuselage was covered in three-ply and featured several compact access panels that permitted easy inspection to the interior. The fuselage accommodated a semi-circular cabin structure that possessed favourable aerodynamic qualities.

The aircraft was furnished with a single-spar trapezoidal-shaped slotted wing; this was claimed to be the first such application of a slotted wing with a single spar structure. It was composed entirely of wood and attached to the central portion using bolts. The wing could be easily folded; to permit this, there was no conventional sheet covering at the connection point of the wing, leaving a free slot that was roughly 1mm across. The automated slots were coupled to the trailing flaps; their use permitted the aircraft to fly at a relatively steep climbing angle as well as low landing speed could be reasonably obtained.

The tail unit had similar construction to that of the main wing, being entirely composed of wood and covered with three-ply. The flight control surfaces were actuated in a conventional manner via an orthodox stick and rudder bar. The undercarriage was braced using streamlined tubes that were intentionally interchangeable for ease of replacement. A combined oleo-pneumatic shock absorber was incorporated along with a rubber-spring tail skid. A hand lever in the cockpit was used to operate the brakes.

A variety of engines around the 150 hp range could be installed to power the aircraft, such as the de Havilland Gipsy III, Hirth HM 504A-2, Hirth HM 506, and Argus As 8R. The engine was installed in the nose of the aircraft and had a light metal fairing. Fuel was delivered to the engine via pumps. The primary oil tank was located behind the forward bulkhead; an additional oil tank was positioned aft of the pilot.

== Operational history ==
Six examples were entered in the championships, which represented almost every example of the type built, the only exception being the first prototype, which had crashed.

The He 64s performed quite well during the numerous speed trials conducted. The type took the first three places in the 7,363 km (4,601 mi) Europa Rundflug ("Rally over Europe") as well as the first five places in top speed trials. They also had high positions in a minimal speed trial. Although no He 64 had won in any of the other categories, these wins were sufficient to gain pilot Fritz Morzik an overall tied second place in the contest.

During 1933, a single He 64C was imported into the United Kingdom for flap research, at first with the aircraft manufacturer Handley Page and later with the Royal Aircraft Establishment, which was flying it by 1935. This aircraft later saw use in Rhodesia as late as 1952.

== Variants ==
He 64a
The prototype of the He 64 family.
He 64b
Initial production version
He 64c
Later production offering a variety of powerplants, including the de Havilland Gipsy III, Hirth HM 504A-2 and Hirth HM 506
He 64d
Two examples of a high speed version were built, powered by the standard Argus As 8R but with elliptical planform wings similar to those fitted to the He 70 and no Handley Page slats. The maximum speed was increased to 290 km/h (180 mph).

== Specifications (He 64b) ==
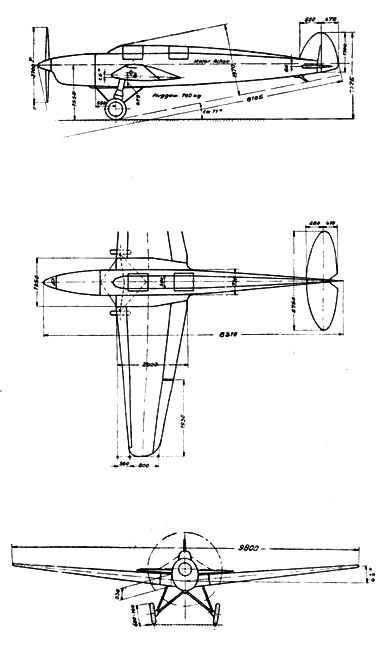
Heinkel He 64 3-view drawing from L'Aerophile Salon 1932

Data from Heinkel: An aircraft album, National Advisory Committee for Aeronautics

General characteristics

- Crew: 1
- Capacity: 1 passenger
- Length: 8.319 m (27 ft 3.5 in)
- Wingspan: 9.792 m (32 ft 1.5 in)
- Height: 2.06 m (6 ft 9 in)
- Empty weight: 470 kg (1,036 lb)
- Max takeoff weight: 780 kg (1,720 lb)
- Powerplant: 1 × Argus As 8R four-cylinder inverted air-cooled in-line piston engine, 110 kW (150 hp)

Performance

- Maximum speed: 245 km/h (152 mph, 132 kn) at sea level
- Cruise speed: 222 km/h (138 mph, 120 kn) at sea level
- Stall speed: 63 km/h (39 mph, 34 kn) (less than)
- Range: 1,500 km (930 mi, 810 nmi)
- Service ceiling: 6,000 m (19,700 ft)
