= Firewall (engine) =

Car part that separates the engine from passengers

Firewall in an automobile illustrated by a red line

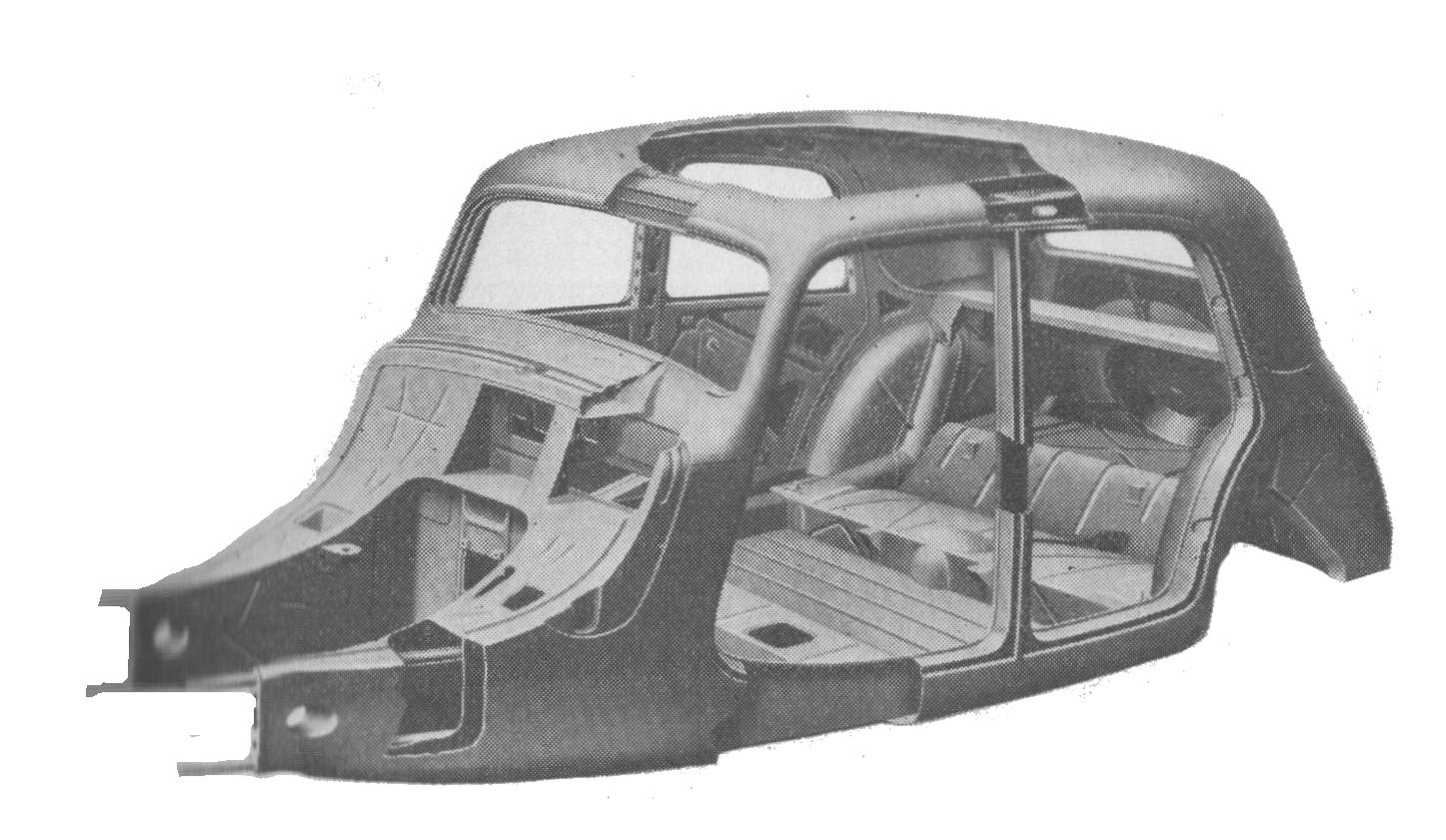
Cutaway drawing of the 1934 Citroen Traction Avant, showing the firewall

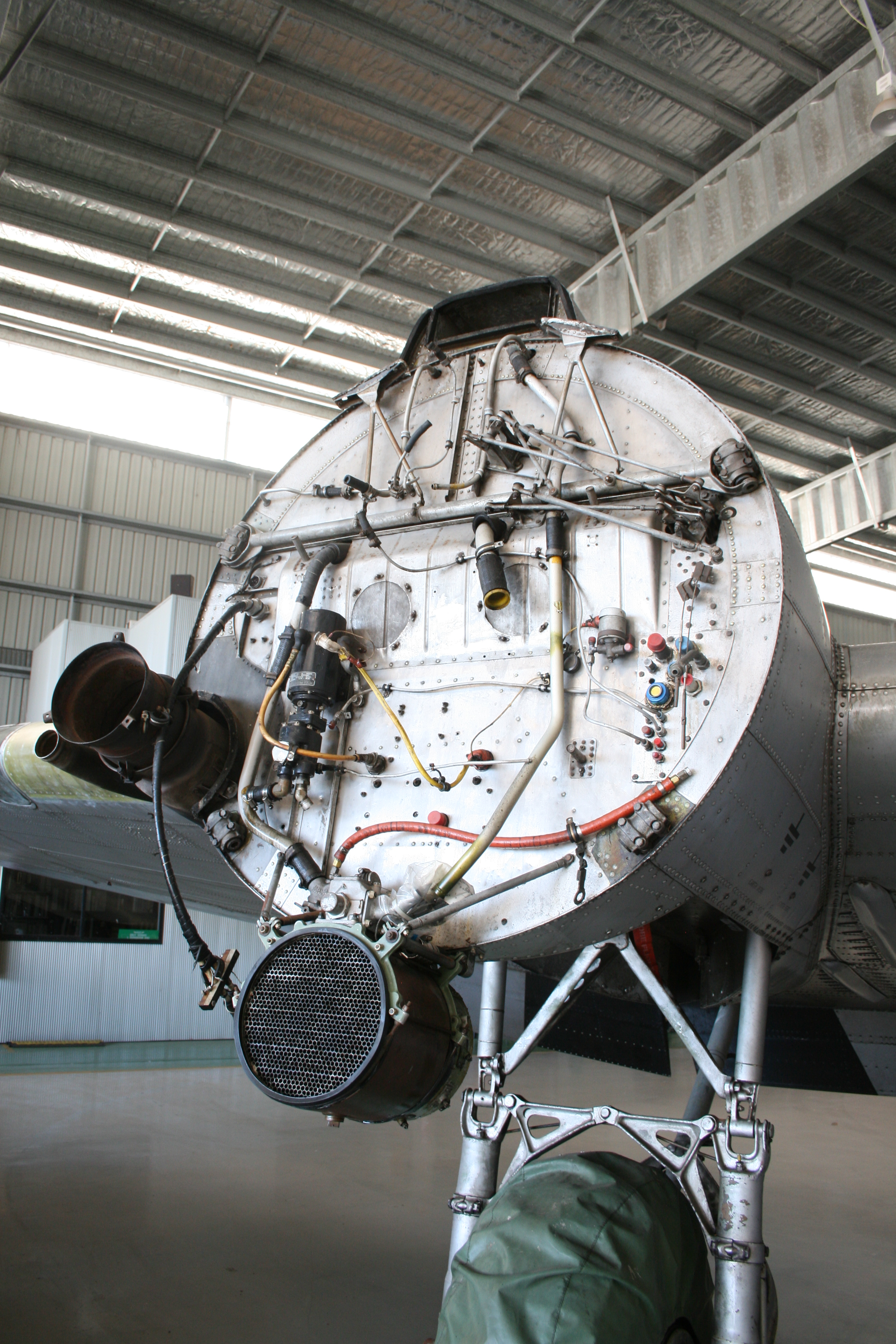
Firewall of an aircraft's engine nacelle

In automotive engineering, a firewall (American English) or bulkhead (British English) is the part of the automobile body (unibody or body-on-frame) that separates the engine compartment from the passenger compartment (driver and passengers). It is most commonly a separate component of the body or, in monocoque construction, a separate steel pressing, but may be continuous with the floorpan, or its edges may form part of the door pillars. The inner and outer surfaces of the firewall are often coated with noise, vibration, and harshness (NVH) absorber to prevent most engine noise from reaching the passenger compartment. The name originates from steam-powered vehicles, where the firewall separated the driver from the fire heating the boiler.

In competition, firewalls are found in specially prepared cars for compartmentalisation. For example, a typical conversion of a production car for rallying will include a metal firewall which seals the fuel tank off from the interior of the vehicle. In the event of an accident, resulting in fuel spillage, the firewall can prevent burning fuel from entering the passenger compartment, where it could cause serious injury or death. In regular stock cars, the firewall separates the engine compartment from the cabin and can, at times, contain fibreglass insulation. Automotive firewalls have to be fitted so that they form a complete seal. Usually this is done by bonding the sheet metal to the bodywork using fibreglass resin.

In aerospace engineering, an aircraft firewall isolates an engine from the other parts of the airframe. In single-engine aircraft, it is the part of the fuselage that separates the engine compartment from the cockpit. In multi-engine propeller aircraft, the firewall is usually part of the engine nacelle and separates the engine from the rear sections of the nacelle or from components mounted behind the engine, such as the wing structure or accessory compartments.

The word "firewall" is also used as a slang term for taking an engine to maximum power or acceleration.
