= Reinhold Poss =

German flying ace and racing pilot

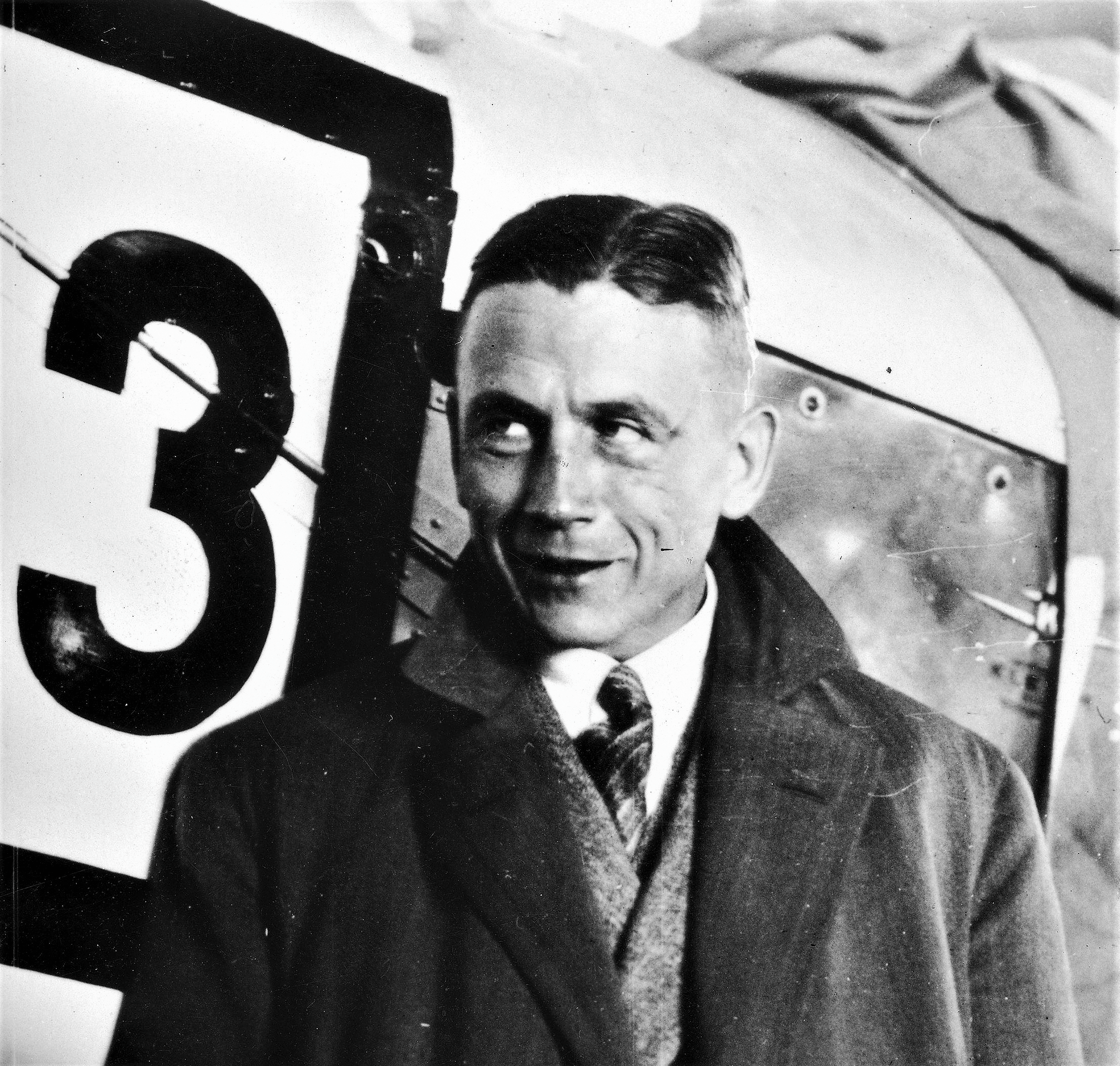
Reinhold Poss 1932

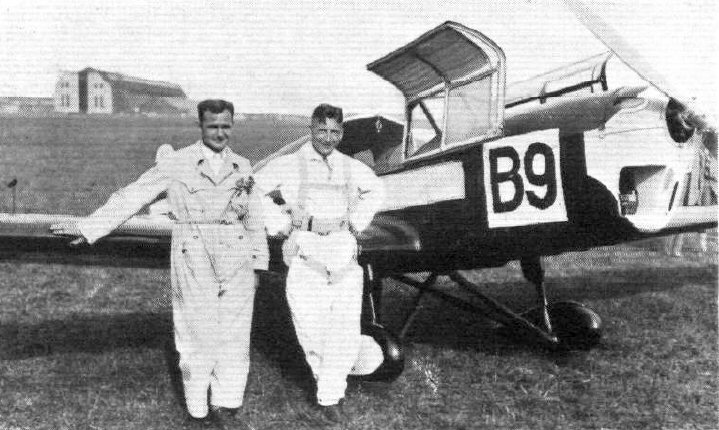
Fritz Morzig and Reinhold Poss

Reinhold Poss (11 September 1897 – 26 August 1933) was a German flying ace and racing pilot. Poss enlisted with the Imperial German Navy during World War I and scored eleven kills as a naval pilot. In May 1918 he took command of the Seefrontstaffel and in September 1918 of the IV. Marinefeldjasta, which he led until 15 October, when he was shot down and captured. He spent the final month of the war in a POW camp.

Following the war, Poss achieved further fame as a pilot, completing, with Hermann Köhl, the first night-time flight between Warnemünde and Stockholm, Sweden. Poss competed in three Fédération Aéronautique Internationale air races, Challenge 1929 (finishing 15/16th overall), Challenge 1930 (2nd overall), and Challenge 1932 (tying Fritz Morzik for 2/3rd).

On 26 August 1933, Poss and his copilot, Paul Weirich, crashed after striking a church tower while flying near Neuruppin. Neither survived. Poss is buried in the Parkfriedhof of Berlin-Lichterfelde.

== See also ==
Challenge 1929
Challenge 1930
Challenge 1932
List of World War I flying aces by nationality
