= BFW M.23 =

1928 German sporting aircraft

M.23
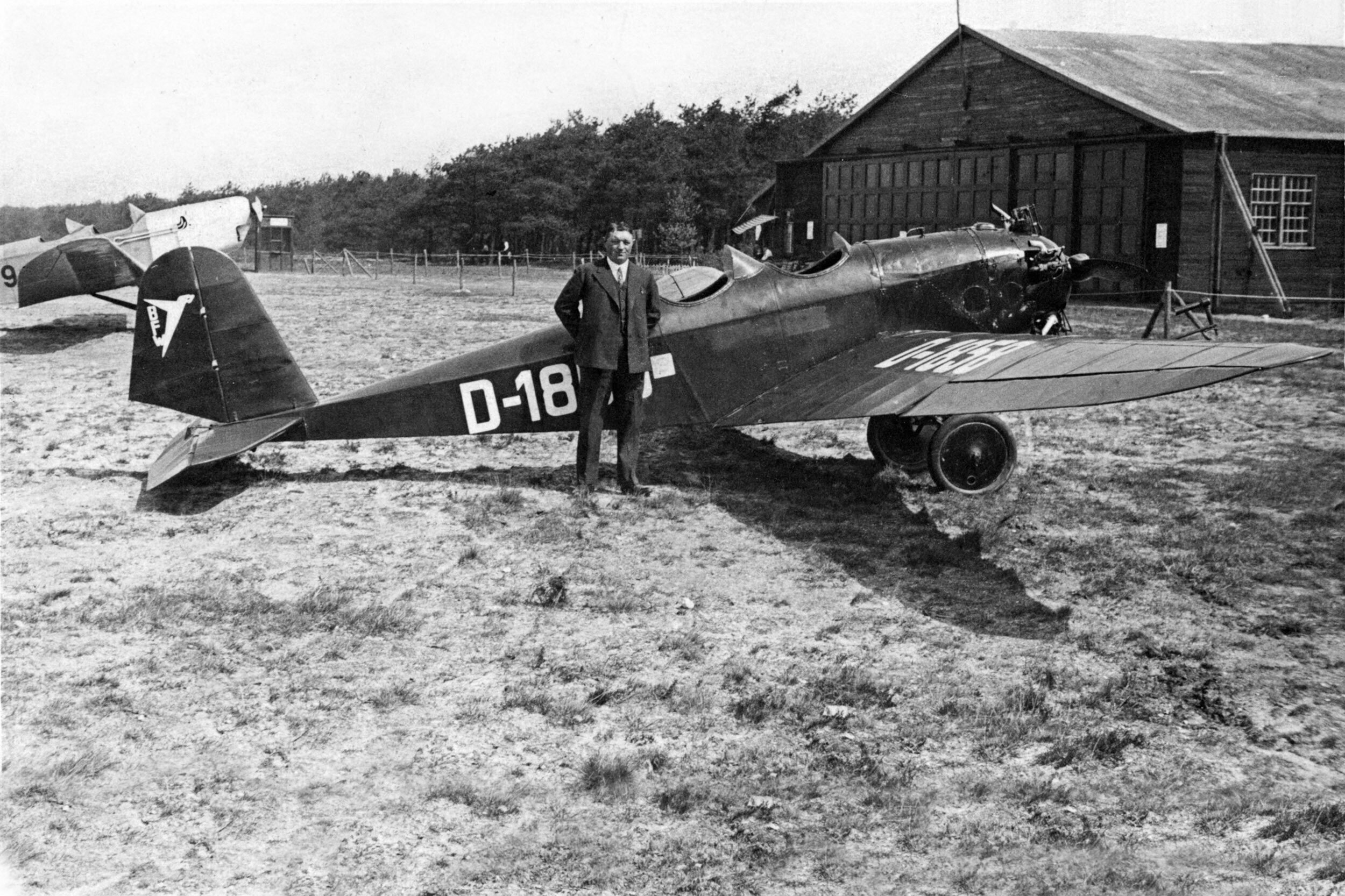

General information
- Type: Two-seat sports aircraft
- National origin: Germany
- Manufacturer: Bayerische Flugzeugwerke (BFW)
- Designer: Willy Messerschmitt
- Number built: ≥ 100

History
- First flight: early 1928
- Developed from: M.19

The BFW M.23, sometimes known as the Messerschmitt M 23, was a 1920s two-seat sporting aircraft designed by Willy Messerschmitt, and produced by Bayerische Flugzeugwerke (BFW). Examples won several prestigious races in 1929 and 1930.

== Development ==
The BFW M.23, (the M standing for its designer Willy Messerschmitt), was developed in response to a specification issued in 1929 by the German Aero Club for the Ostpreussenflug (East Prussian Circuit) competition. The result was an improved version of the M.19, with seating for two, and wings that could be folded for transport or storage.

The M.23 was a small, conventional low-wing cantilever monoplane. It had a fixed undercarriage, the mainwheels mounted on a cranked axle, plus a tailskid. The fin and rudder assembly were broader and shorter than that of the M.19, though the shape varied with sub-type. A wide variety of engines were fitted, with power ranging from the 28 kW (38 hp) ABC Scorpion two-cylinder motor to the 112 kW (150 hp) of the seven-cylinder Siemens Sh 14a radial.

The first of three production variants, the M.23a used low-powered engines and had a very angular vertical tail. The M.23b had curved upper fuselage decking and a more rounded tail and was produced with a large range of engines, both inline and radial. The length depended slightly on the engine fitted. The final version, the M.23c had an enclosed cockpit, the most powerful engines and was slightly larger (200 mm/8 in in span, around 500 mm/20 in in length) than the earlier variants. Its tail was again different, more rounded at the top and missing the elevator cutaway of the earlier models.

At least one M.23b appeared on floats.

== Operational history ==
The M.23bs won both the 1929 Ostpreussenflug (Genet-powered) and the Circuit of Europe (Siemens Sh 13-powered) races. The M.23c was developed for, and won, the Circuit of Europe the following year with seven of them entered.

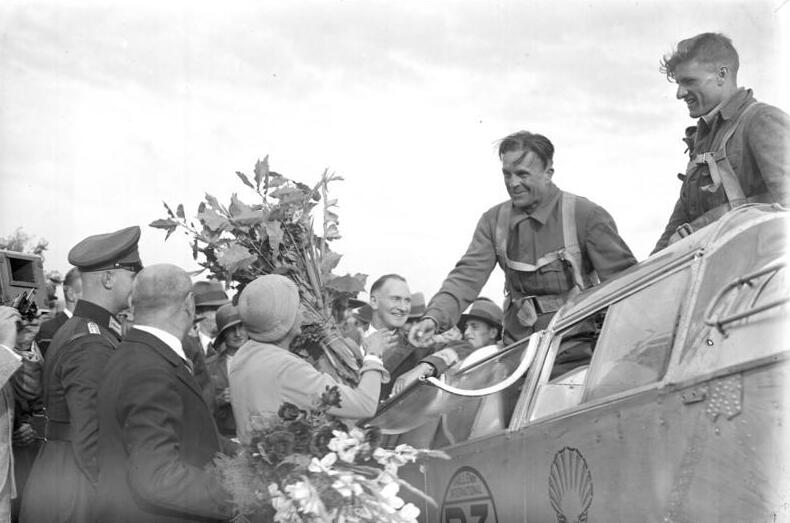
The winner of the 1930 Circuit of Europe, Fritz Morzik at Berlin Tempelhof, July 1930 with the M.23c

Production numbers are not certain, but 74 appear on the reconstructed German civil aircraft register; 53 of these are M.23bs and 11 M.23cs. Many were bought by flying clubs for basic and acrobatic training. Other went to individual owners, with some familiar names amongst them like Ernst Udet (who made well publicised flights to Africa and to Greenland, the latter with Leni Riefenstahl as a passenger) and Rudolf Hess. In 1933, Erwin Aichele and his wife flew trouble-free for 13,000 km (8,000 mi) around the Mediterranean.

The corresponding Romanian registers show 26 more M.23bs, 14 of them locally built by ICAR (Intreprinderea de Constructii Aeronautice Romanesti, "Enterprise for Romanian Aeronautical Constructions") under licence from Messerschmitt. These were distinct from the Romanian modified version known as the ICAR Universal. The licensing deal was part of Messerschmitt's successful attempt to save a small core of staff from BFW when it went bankrupt in June 1931, a group that became Messerschmitt-Flugzeubau GmbH and survived until the reformation of BFW under the Nazis in 1933.

== Variants ==
M.23
initial open cockpit variant, powered by a 15 kW (20 hp) Daimler F7502 2-cyl horizontally opposed engine.
M.23a
either 28 kW (38 hp) ABC Scorpion or 34 kW (46 hp) Salmson 9ADb nine-cylinder radial.
M.23b
many engines fitted, including

70 kW (94 hp) inline upright ADC Cirrus III
85 kW (114 hp) inline ADC Cirrus Hermes
64 kW (86 hp) five-cylinder radial Armstrong Siddeley Genet
37 kW (50 hp) five-cylinder radial BMW X
62 kW (83 hp) radial Siemens Sh 13
86 kW (115 hp) seven-cylinder radial Siemens Sh 14

M.23c
Powered by several engine types, including

82 kW (110 hp) in-line inverted Argus As 8
112 kW (150 hp) radial Siemens Sh 14a.

== Specifications (M.23b with Siemens Sh 14 engine)) ==
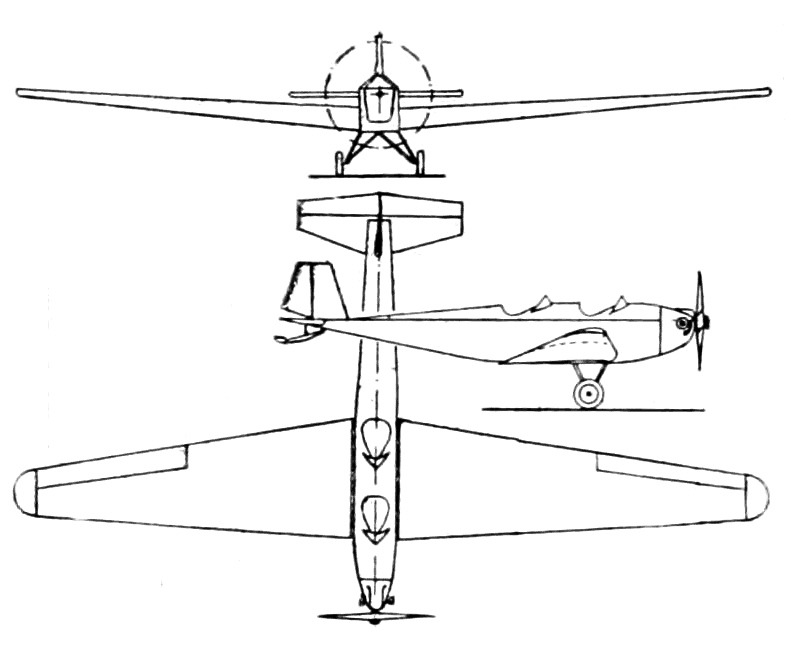
BFW M.23 3-view drawing from Aero Digest October 1929

Data from Smith 1971, p. 26

General characteristics

- Crew: two
- Length: 6.35 m (20 ft 10 in)
- Wingspan: 11.80 m (38 ft 8.5 in)
- Height: 2.30 m (7 ft 6.5 in)
- Wing area: 14.4 m^{2} (155 sq ft)
- Empty weight: 370 kg (816 lb)
- Gross weight: 670 kg (1,477 lb)
- Powerplant: 1 × 7-cylinder radial Siemens Sh 14 , 86 kW (115 hp)

Performance

- Maximum speed: 185 km/h (115 mph, 100 kn)
- Range: 1,000 km (621 mi, 540 nmi)

== See also ==
- Albatros L 100 and L.101
- Arado L II
- Darmstadt D-18
- Junkers A 50
- Klemm Kl 25E

== Bibliography ==
- Cortet, Pierre (August 2000). "Rétros du Mois" [Retros of the Month]. Avions: Toute l'Aéronautique et son histoire (in French) (89): 4. ISSN 1243-8650.
- Smith, J Richard (1971). Messerschmitt: An Aircraft Album. London: Ian Allan. ISBN 0-7110-0224-X.
