= Challenge International de Tourisme 1929 =

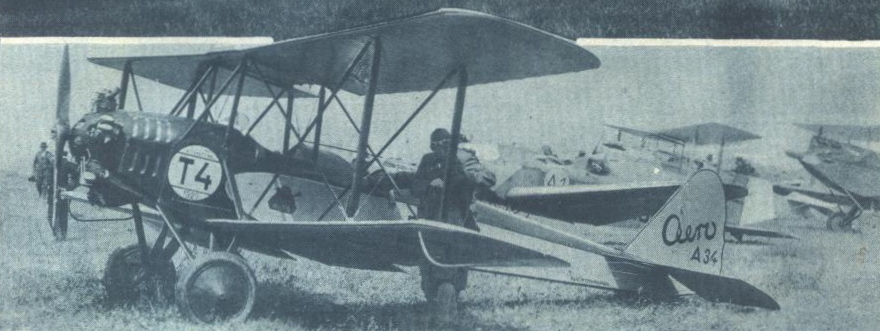
The Aero A.34 at the 1929 event with other competitors in the background

The Challenge 1929 was the first FAI International Tourist Plane Contest (French: Challenge International de Tourisme), that took place between August 4 and August 16, 1929 in Paris, France. Four Challenges, from 1929 to 1934, were major aviation events in pre-war Europe.

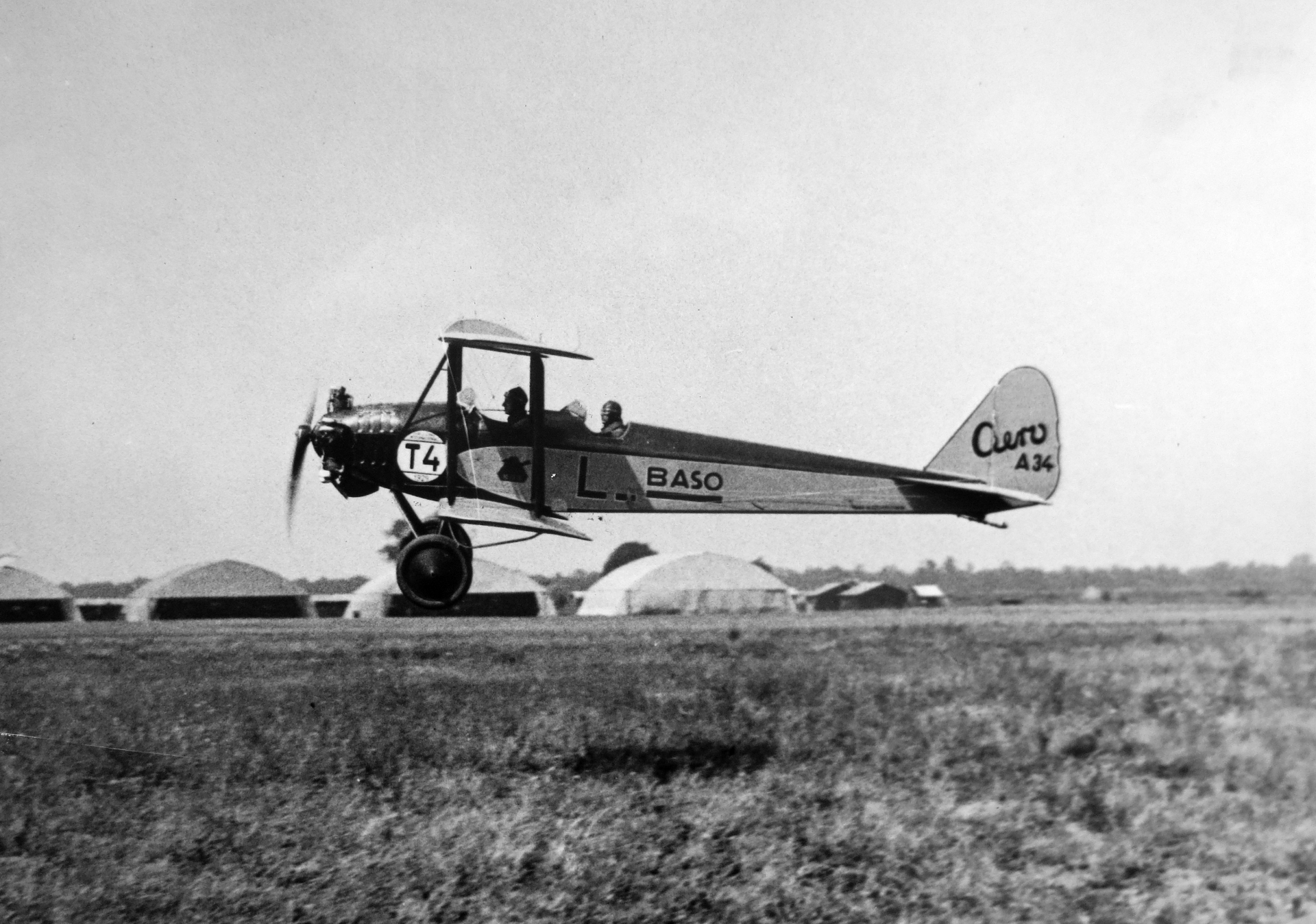
The Aero A.34 taking off at the 1929 event

== Overview ==
The contest was conceived by the Aéro-Club de France, inspired by the International Light Aircraft Contest, in France in 1928. The idea of a tourist plane contest was approved by the FAI, and the first Challenge was to be organized by the French.

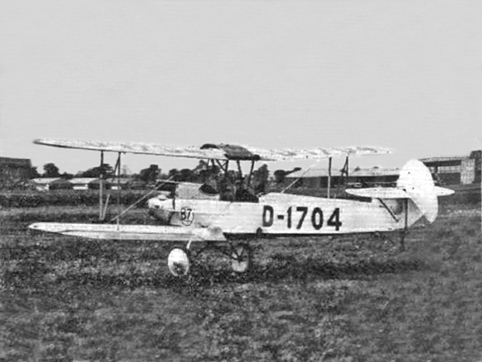
The Albatros L82 at Orly airport

The contest was opened on August 4, 1929 in Paris. It consisted of two parts: technical trials of aircraft and a rally over Europe. Since one of the aims of the Challenge was to generate a progress in aircraft building, it was not only pilots' competition, but technical trials also included a construction evaluation, to build more advanced tourist planes.

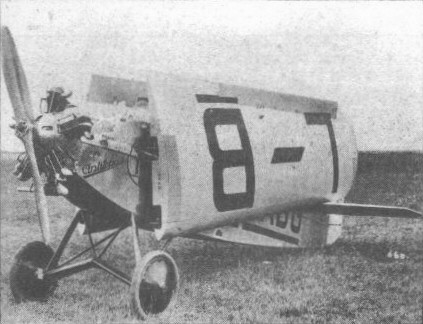
The Avia BH-11 folded for the garaging test

55 aircraft entered the Challenge in 1929, from six countries: Germany (24 crews), Italy (12 crews), France (9 crews), United Kingdom (5 crews), Czechoslovakia (3 crews), and Switzerland (2 crews). In some teams there were also foreign aviators, e.g. in the German team there was the Canadian John Carberry, flying a German RK-25 aircraft; in the French team there were two Belgians. Among the British team, there was one woman Winifred Spooner (the second, Lady Mary Bailey, eventually flew the rally apart from the contest). All planes flew with two-men crews, pilot and passenger or mechanic.

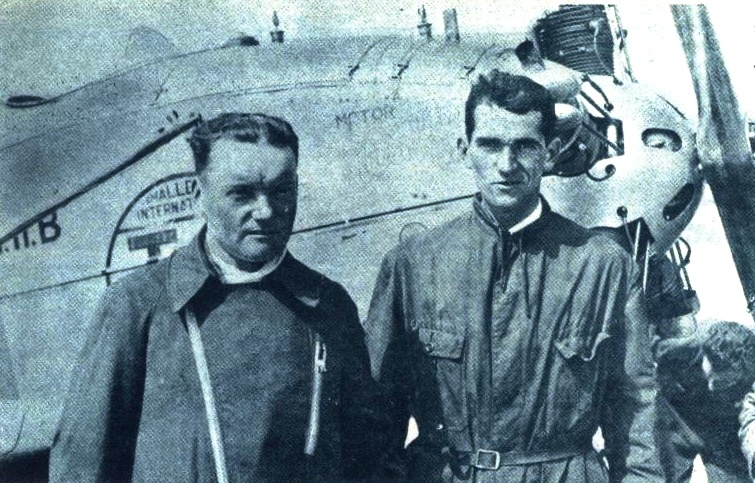
Kleps, the BH-11 pilot, pictured with his mechanic in front of the aircraft

== Aircraft ==
The aircraft in the contest were popular sport planes of the late twenties years, like de Havilland Gipsy Moth (DH-60G), which was the main aircraft of the British team. These aircraft had mostly open cabs, built in low-wing, high-wing or biplane layout. Unlike in the following years, there were no aircraft built specially for a Challenge contest, only the Czech Avia BH-11B's "Antilopa" were improved by adding folding wings. All aircraft in the contest had fixed landing gear and had no wing mechanization. The most numerous were German BFW M.23b (9 aircraft) and Klemm (6 of the L.25 Ia model, including 2 in the Swiss team, and 2 of the L.26 model). BFW's and Klemms were wooden low-wing planes with open two-seater tandem cabins.

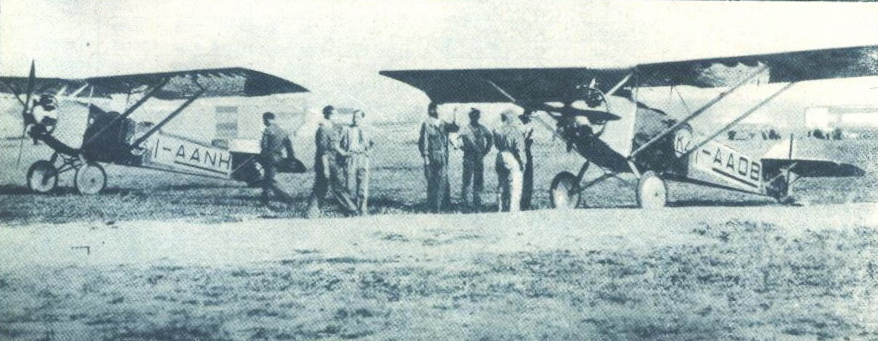
The two fiat AS.1 competitors

== Technical trials ==
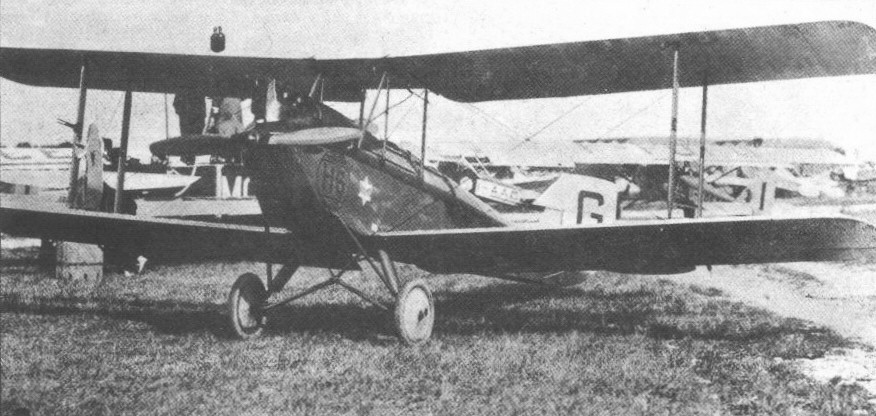
The de Havilland DH.60 Moth, with Gipsy engine, piloted by Miss Winifred Spooner in the "Challenge International de Tourisme", 1929.

The first part of the contest were technical trials, starting on August 4. Unlike the following Challenges, it was not too complicated and consisted of a technical evaluation, quick engine start test, quick wing folding test and fuel consumption trial only.

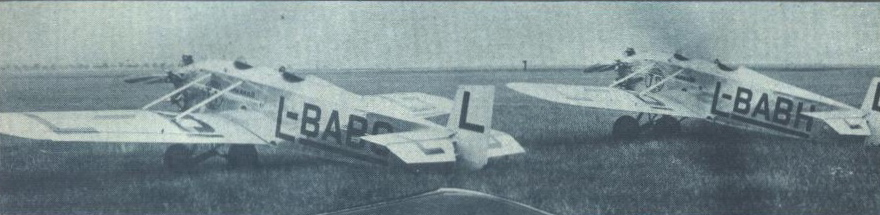
The two Avia BH-11 aircraft, with Walter Vega engines, taking part in the "Challenge International de Tourisme", 1929.

The first was a technical evaluation of competing planes' construction. Such features, like twin controls, rich set of controls, wheel brakes, fire safety devices and a room for parachutes, could bring up to 18 points. Most points was given to the Italian Breda Ba-15s (11.75 to 12 pts) and German all-metal Junkers A50s (11.75 pts). Very good result of 11.25 points was obtained also by the Italian Fiat AS.1s and Romeo Ro-5s. The German BFW M.23b were given only 9.5 points, DH-60s - from 9.5 to 10.5 points, and the lowest result was 8 points (Caudron C.113).

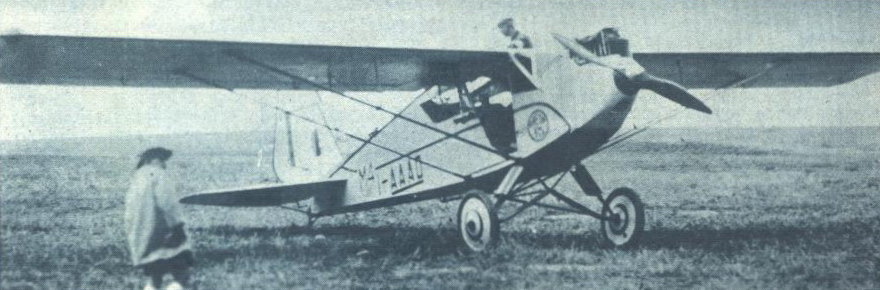
The Breda Ba.15 taking part in the "Challenge International de Tourisme", 1929.

After quick wings' folding and quick engine starting tests, the classification leader was the Czech Josef Novak flying an Aero A.34 biplane, with 17.5 pts. Behind him, there were three Italians flying Romeo Ro-5 biplanes (17.25 pts), then the rest. The best German pilot, Wolf Hirth, had 16.25 pts (12th place, Klemm L.25), but most Germans had a few points less. Some planes were handicapped, not having folding wings. Some crews completed wings' folding trial on 6 August.

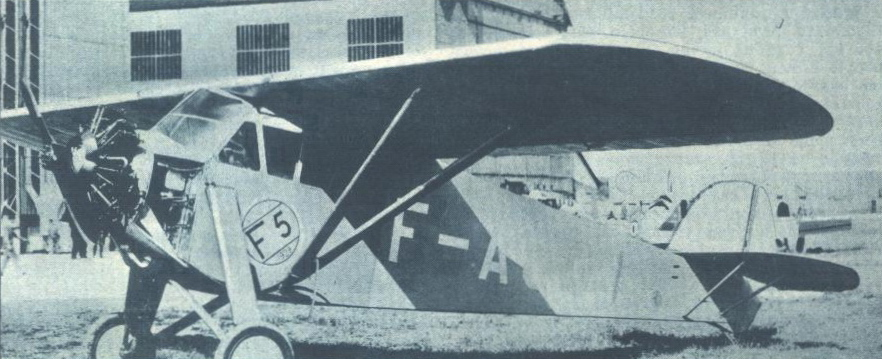
The Potez 36 aircraft taking part in the "Challenge International de Tourisme", 1929.

The last was a fuel consumption test, on 6 x 50 km closed circuit, on 5 August. It could bring up to 20 points. The best result was obtained by the German Johannes Nehring flying a Darmstadt D-18 biplane (18.5 pts), then the Swiss Hans Wirth (Klemm L.25), three German Junkers A50 and two Czech Avia BH-11s, with 15-17 pts. The German Klemms also were good at this trial, with 12-14.5 pts.

The fuel consumption trial changed the general classification order. The three leaders, with 32 pts each, became Johannes Nehring (Darmstadt D-18), the Swiss Hans Wirth (Klemm L.25) and the Czech František Klepš (BH-11). Further places, from the 4th to the 10th, were occupied by the German crew of Klemms and Junkers', with 29,5 - 30,5 pts, the best of them was Robert Lusser. The best Englishman, Hubert Broad, was on the 15th place, while Winifred Spooner was on the 25th place (22.5 pts). The German BFW M.23b's occupied poor positions, the best result of the BFW was 25 pts, while Fritz Morzik flying BFW gained only 19.5 pkt, what gave him the 30th place. John Carberry, flying the German RK-25, occupied the last 47th place with mere 12 pts. The point differences were not high, but they were not easy to level during the next part of the contest.

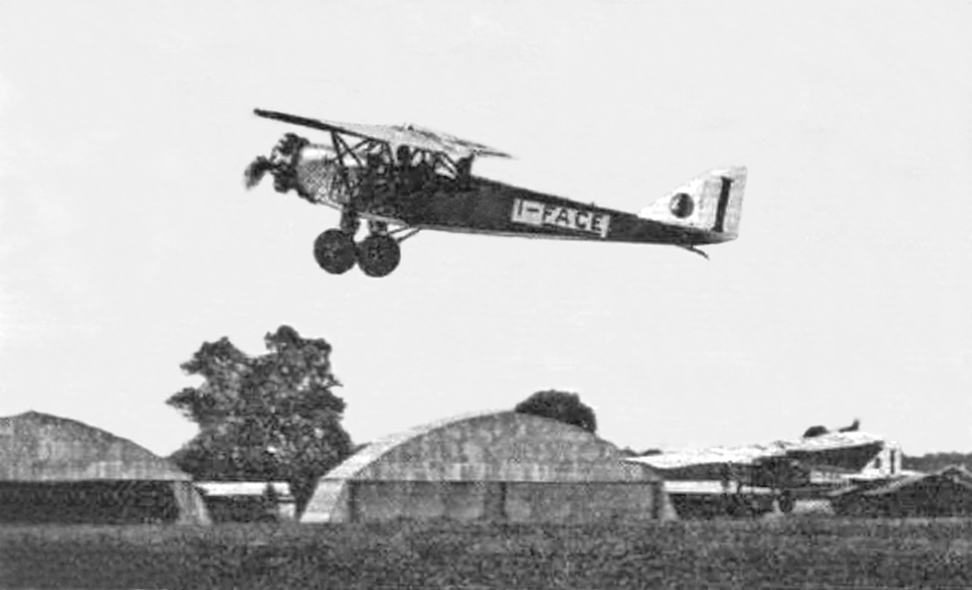
The IMAM Ro.5 at the 1929 International Challenge

Top results of the technical trials:
	Pilot	country	aircraft	points
1-3.	Johannes Nehring	Germany	Darmstadt D-18	32.5
1-3.	Hans Wirth	Switzerland	Klemm L.25 Ia	32.5
1-3.	František Klepš	Czechoslovakia	Avia BH-11	32.5
4.	Robert Lusser	Germany	Klemm L.25 Ia	30.5
5-6.	Waldemar Roeder	Germany	Junkers A.50	30.25
5-6.	Reinhold Poss	Germany	Klemm L.25 Ia	30.25
7.	Friedrich Siebel	Germany	Klemm L.25 Ia	30
8.	Johann Risztics	Germany	Junkers A 50	29.75
9-10.	Wolf Hirth	Germany	Klemm L.25 Ia	29.5
9-10.	Franz Kneer	Germany	Junkers A.50	29.5
11.	Václav Vlček	Czechoslovakia	Avia BH-11	29
12.	Federico Guazetti	Italy	Romeo Ro-5	28.5
13.	F. Kirsch	Germany	Klemm L.26	27.75
14.	Mario Stoppani	Italy	CANT 26	27.25
15.	Hubert Broad	United Kingdom	DH-60	26.25

Eight crews dropped out during technical trials, mostly due to engine malfunctions during the last trial. After having dropped out in a fuel consumption trial, the German Arado L.1 was crashed by its designer H. Hoffmann, while trying to show some aerobatics over the airfield.

== Rally over Europe ==
The second part of the contest was a 5942 km rally over Europe, on a path: Paris - Basil - Genova - Lyon - Marseille - Saint Raphael - Turin - Milan - Venice - Zagreb - Belgrad - Bucharest - Turnu Severin - Budapest - Vienna - Brno -Prague - Wrocław (Breslau) - Warsaw - Poznań - Berlin - Hamburg - Amsterdam - Brussels - Paris. Main waypoints were: Belgrad, Warsaw and Paris. It was not a mere rally, but rather a trial of aircraft capability on such a long path. Important factors were: keeping a good cruise speed, a regularity of flight (covering at least 1 stage daily and spending nights at appointed airfields), and lack of major repairs. Maximum number of points to obtain in a rally was 119 (70 for a cruise speed, 35 for regularity, 14 for reliability).

The rally started on at 9 am on August 7, from Orly airfield in Paris. Two crews dropped out during the start, including the Czech Josef Novak, flying an Aero A.34 whose engine failed and the plane turned over upon crashing. Though maximum speed was not important, most crews tried to make their best, and a group of the nine fastest crews reached Belgrad just at noon on August 8. Among them were: Hubert Broad, Winifred Spooner, František Klepš (Avia BH-11), Johannes Nehring (D-18), Raymond Delmotte (Caudron C.191) and John Carberry (RK-25). This group was in the lead at the next airfields, too. Other groups were five German crews, with Fritz Morzik (BFW M.23b), and two groups of Italians; most other crews flew separately. Some crews dropped out on the way, mostly due to faults and unplanned landings.

On August 9, starting from 9 am, most crews took off from Belgrad, though some crews had not reached this point yet. On August 11, the leading group took off from Brno and reached Warsaw. Flying to Poznań, Johannes Nehring was forced to land and damaged his Darmstadt D-18, one of the contest's fastest machines. Some other crews dropped out as well.

Since competitors were not allowed to land in Paris before August 14 at 3 pm, the leading group took off from Brussels and flew over Orly airfield minutes before 3 pm. A few minutes later, just as the jury started work, 19 aircraft landed in Paris. The first to touch the ground was the Italian Batista Botalla flying a Fiat AS.1. On that day, four more crews arrived. On August 15, three crews finished, and on the next day the remaining ones. Only 31 crews out of 47 finished the rally.

Only two crews reached the maximum 119 pts for the rally: the German Fritz Morzik (BFW M.23b) and the Canadian John Carberry (RK-25). The next score was 109 pts for Hubert Broad (DH-60G). Good results, 99-104 pts were obtained by five Italian crews, flying in a group. Winners of the technical trials gained less points for the race, taking further positions (Robert Lusser - 97.75 pts, František Klepš - 94 pts, Hans Wirth - 81.75 pts).

Top results of the rally:
	Pilot	country	aircraft	points
1.	Fritz Morzik	Germany	BFW M.23b	119 pts
2.	John Carberry	Canada	Raka RK-25	119 pts
3.	Hubert Broad	United Kingdom	DH-60	109 pts
4.	Wolf von Dungern	Germany	BFW M.23b	106.5 pts
5.	Umberto Gelmetti	Italy	Romeo Ro-5	104 pts
6.	Federico Guazetti	Italy	Romeo Ro-5	99 pts
7.	Winifred Spooner	United Kingdom	DH-60	99 pts
8.	Gustavo Castaldo	Italy	Romeo Ro-5	99 pts
9.	Francesco Lombardi	Italy	Fiat AS.1	99 pts
10.	Batista Bottalla	Italy	Fiat AS.1	99 pts

== Results ==
After a rally, on August 16 there was a closing ceremony. After counting of points, the first place was given to the German, Fritz Morzik. The second place was taken by Hubert Broad.

Top 10 results of the contest
	Pilot	country	aircraft	registration / starting number	points: technical + rally	= total
1.	Fritz Morzik	Germany	BFW M.23b	D-1673 / A4	19.5 + 119	138.5
2.	Hubert Broad	United Kingdom	DH-60G	G-AAHS / H5	26.25 + 109	135.25
3.	John Carberry	Canada (Germany)	Raka RK-25	D-1701 / B3	12 + 119	131
4.	Robert Lusser	Germany	Klemm L.25 Ia	D-1714 / C2	30.5 + 97.75	128.25
5.	Federico Guazetti	Italy	Romeo Ro-5	? / M3	28.25 + 99	127.25
6.	Wolf von Dungern	Germany	BFW M.23b	D-1674 / A3	20.25 + 106.5	126.75
7.	František Klepš	Czechoslovakia	Avia BH-11	L-BABG / T1	32.5 + 94	126.5
8.	Gustavo Castaldo	Italy	Romeo Ro-5	I-IACE / M2	25.25 + 99	124.25
9.	Umberto Gelmetti	Italy	Romeo Ro-5	? / M1	18 + 104	122
10.	Winifred Spooner	United Kingdom	DH-60G	G-AAAL / H6	22.5 + 99	121.5

Some other results
	Pilot	country	aircraft	registration / starting number	points: technical + rally	= total (notes)
11.	Waldemar Roeder	Germany	Junkers A50be	D-1683 / D5	30.25 + 90.25	120.5
12.	Carlo Benasatti	Italy	Romeo Ro-5	I-FARO / K8	19.25 + ?	117.75?
13.	Francesco Lombardi	Italy	Fiat AS.1	? / K3	18.5 + 99	117.5
14.	Batista Bottalla	Italy	Fiat AS.1	? / K4	18 + 99	117
15/16.	Hans Wirth	Switzerland	Klemm L.25 Ia	? / S2	32.5 + 81.75	114.25 (the best Swiss)
15/16.	Reinhold Poss	Germany	Klemm L.25 Ia	D-1713 / C6	30.25 + 84	114.25
22.	M. Weiss	France	Potez 36	F-AJGT / F5	23.75 + 74.75	98.5 (the best French)
26.	Maurice Finat	France	Potez 36	F-AJGW / F6	18.50 + 72.75	91.25
27.	Werner Junck	Germany	Albatros L 82b	D-1706 / B9	25.25 + 64.75	90
28.	Raymond Delmotte	France	Caudron C.191	F-AJGH / E7	12.75 + 72.75	85.5
31.	Jacques Maus	Belgium	St Hubert G.1	OO-AKY / H2	18 + 54.5	72.5 (the best Belgian (in the French team), the last classified competitor)

The first prize in the Challenge was 100,000 French franc, the 2nd - 50,000 FRF, the 3rd - 25,000 FRF, 16 other crews would get 7,350 FRF.

The contest was a German success, including John Carberry, but only 12 out of 24 German crews finished the contest. Very good result was obtained by the Italian team - 9 out of 12 crews finished, and on good places.

Due to German victory, the next Challenge 1930 was organized in Germany. The new regulations of 1930 put more accent to technical part, demanding more advanced aircraft.

== See also ==
- Challenge 1930
- Challenge 1932
- Challenge 1934
