= Challenge International de Tourisme 1930 =

European flight competition

The International Touring Competition in 1930 (French: Challenge International de Tourisme) was the second FAI international touring aircraft contest, that took place between July 18 and August 8, 1930 in Berlin, Germany. Four Challenges, from 1929 to 1934, were major aviation events in pre-war Europe.

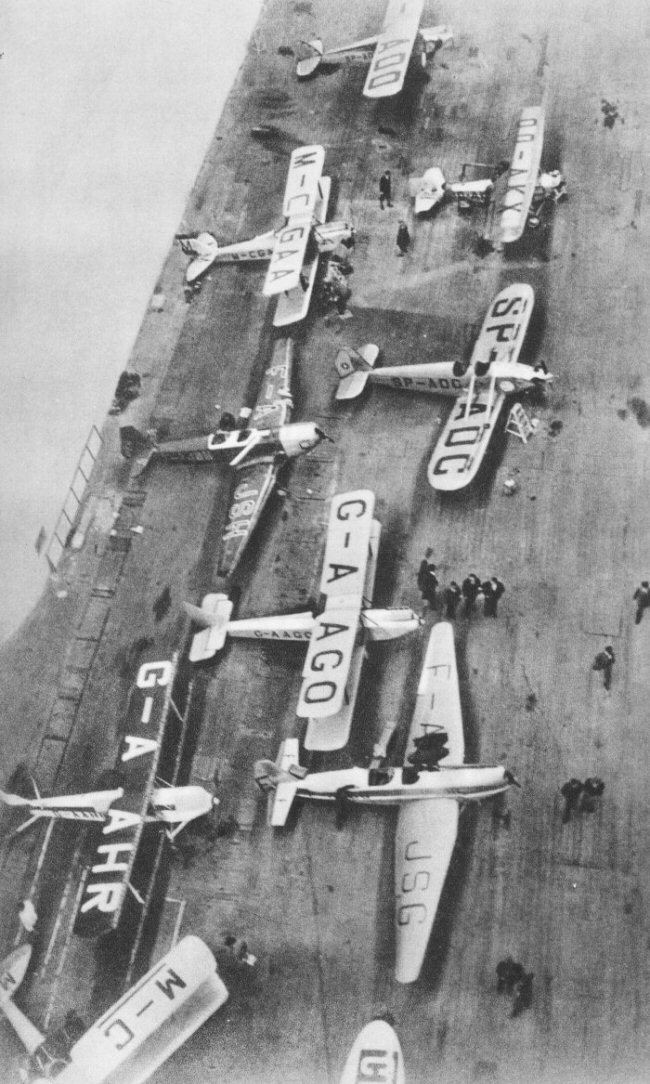
The aircraft before contest, in Zeppelin Staaken hangar. Among others, Hubert Broad's Gipsy Moth G-AAHR is visible, in front of it, Caudron C.193 F-AJSG.

== Overview ==
Germany organized the contest, because the German pilot Fritz Morzik won the previous contest in 1929. The regulation based upon the FAI rules, but details were worked out by the German Aero Club. The international Sports Committee was headed by the German Gerd von Hoeppner. 98 crews applied, but eventually 60 aircraft entered the Challenge in 1930, from six countries: Germany (30 crews), Poland (12 crews), United Kingdom (7 crews), France (6 crews), Spain (3 crews) and the Swiss (2 crews). In the British team there was one Canadian, and in the French team – one Belgian. It was the first major international event in which the Polish aviation took part, with second most numerous team in addition, equipped with own design aircraft. This time, Italy nor Czechoslovakia did not participate.

In the German team there was first of all Fritz Morzik – a winner of the Challenge 1929. Among the British team, there were pilots: Captain Hubert Broad (2nd place in 1929), the Canadian John Carberry (3rd place in 1929) and two women: Winifred Spooner and Lady Mary Bailey. In the Spanish team, there was prince Antonio de Habsburgo-Borbón. Many other known aviators of that time took part in the contest as well.

The contest was open on July 18, 1930, at Berlin-Staaken airfield. It consisted of two parts: a circuit over Europe and technical trials. Since one of the aims of the Challenge was to generate a progress in aircraft designing, it was not only pilots' competition, but technical trials also included a construction evaluation, to build more advanced and reliable touring planes. All planes flew with two-men crews, pilot and passenger or mechanic (apart from the Swiss Charles Kolp, who took two passengers, including one woman, into his Klemm VL.25).

== Aircraft ==
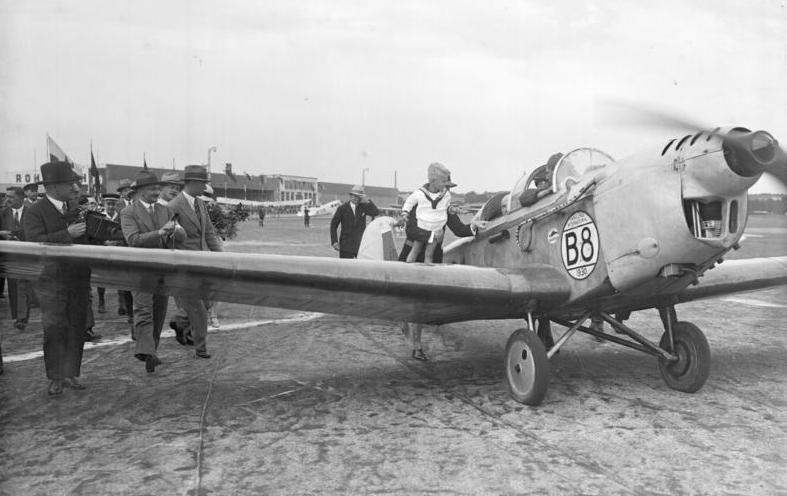
Klemm L.25E of Reinhold Poss after the rally.

Most of the aircraft in the contest were popular sport planes of the late 1920s, that took part in the previous contest as well, like de Havilland Gipsy Moth DH-60G, which was the main aircraft of the British and Spanish teams. These aircraft had mostly open cabs, and were built in mostly low-wing (29) or high-wing (17) layout, only 13 were biplanes (and 1 mid-wing). Only five were of all-metal construction, most were all-wooden. On contrary to a previous contest, there appeared also some special aircraft, better suited to meet the Challenge demands. First of all, they were German BFW M.23c and Klemm L 25E, being new variants of successful machines of 1929 – wooden low-wing monoplanes with closed canopy, belonging to lighter category, yet fitted with powerful Argus engines, having better chance in technical trials. All aircraft in the contest had fixed conventional landing gear and had no wing mechanization (slats or flaps) yet.

Aircraft participating were BFW M.23c (10), BFW M.23b (1), Klemm L.25 (4), Klemm L.25E (3), Klemm L 26 (2), Klemm VL 25 (1), Junkers A50 (3), Arado L II (4), Albatros L 100 (1), Albatros L 101 (1), Darmstadt D-18 (1), de Havilland DH.60G Gipsy Moth (6), Avro Avian (1), Spartan Arrow (1), Monocoupe 110 (1), RWD-2 (3), RWD-4 (3), PZL.5 (2), PWS-50 (1), PWS-51 (1), PWS-52 (1), PWS-8 (1), Caudron C.193 (3), Caudron C.232 (1), Peyret-Mauboussin PM XI (1), Saint Hubert G1 (1), Breda Ba.15S (1), CASA C-1 (1).

20 aircraft were assigned to the Class II with net weight up to 322 kg (300 kg plus 15%), the remaining 40 to the Class I with net weight up to 460 kg (400 kg plus 15%). Class II aircraft were 11 German BFW M.23s and 5 Klemm L.25s and L.25E's (apart from two L.25 IVa), 3 Polish RWD-2s and one French PM XI. The classes had influence on awarding points for cruise speed and fuel consumption only.

The aircraft had alphanumerical starting numbers, the German from a range: A2-A9, B3-B9, C1-C9, D1-D8, E1-E9, F1-F2, British: K1-K8, French: L1-L3, M1-M6, Polish: O1-O9, P1-P5, Swiss: S1-S2, Spanish: T1-T7 (numbers were painted in a circle, with inscription: Challenge International and 1930).

== Circuit over Europe ==
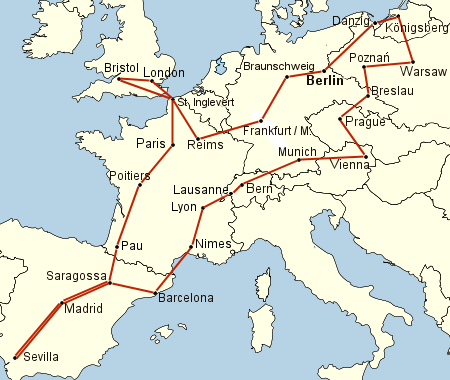
Circuit over Europe

The contest in 1930 was the only Challenge, in which a rally was the opening phase. It was a 7560 km circuit over Europe, with compulsory stops at: Berlin – Braunschweig – Frankfurt – Reims – Saint-Inglevert – Bristol – London – Saint-Inglevert – Paris – Poitiers – Pau – Zaragoza – Madrid – Seville – Zaragoza – Barcelona – Nimes – Lyon – Lausanne – Bern – Munich – Vienna – Prague – Breslau (Wrocław) – Poznań – Warsaw – Königsberg (Kaliningrad) – Danzig (Gdańsk) – Berlin. Distances ranged from 77.5 km (Lausanne – Bern) to 410 km (Danzig – Berlin). In spite of attempts of many pilots at being the first man home, it was not a race, but rather a reliability test. A regularity of flights was the most important factor, the second was a cruise speed (minimal cruise speed had to be 80 km/h for Class I aircraft or 60 km/h for lighter Class II aircraft. Cruise speeds above 175/155 km/h respectively did not give extra points). The average speed was judged on flying time, so a competitor had to have his log book signed as soon after landing as possible. A competitor was given 75 points for regularity, which were mulcted for spending nights off the control airfield or not covering any stage in a day. One night outside the control or arrival after the official closing time (8 p.m.) costed 15 points, two nights – 45 points, and three failures to reach the control caused a disqualification. Also, for failing to fly any stage in a day, a competitor would lose 10 points, and for the second time – another 20 points. The original time limit for the return to Berlin was 4 p.m. on July 31, but it got extended later for some crews, due to bad weather in Pau. Apart from 75 points for regularity, up to 195 points could be gained for a high cruise speed. Compared with the 1929 competition, the rally could bring only 54% of maximum number of points (in 1929 – 72%), which meant more stress on technical trials.

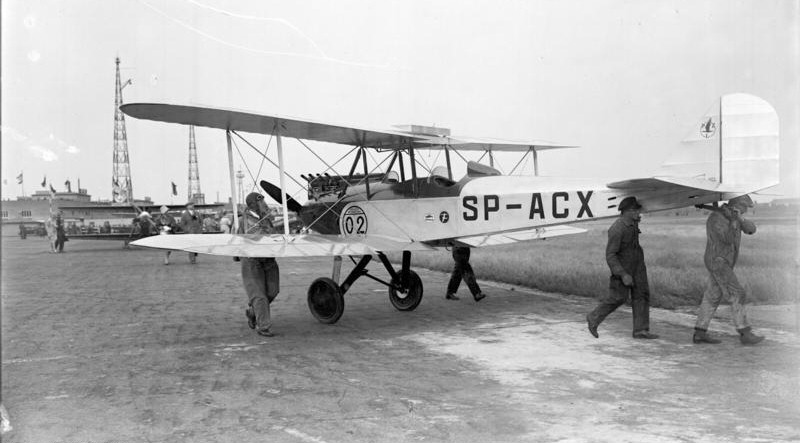
Polish PZL-5 of Bolesław Orliński before take-off.

The crews took off between 9 and 9.59 AM on Sunday, July 20, from Berlin-Tempelhof. Despite poor weather, on the first day, fifteen crews reached Saint-Inglevert near Calais, 1058 km away (among them, 6 British crews, 4 French, 3 Polish and only 2 German). One Spanish and one Polish crew damaged their aircraft (CASA C-1 and PWS-52) and had to withdraw, the other Pole from the fastest group Tadeusz Karpiński (RWD-4) got ill from appendicitis. On July 21 the weather enabled flying only about mid-day, but then most crews flew over the English Channel, and the fastest 23 planes managed to return to France. Three British and three French crews reached Paris that day, flying 843,5 km. One French crew destroyed the plane during a forced landing (PM XI), several other planes got damaged on that or the previous day, but could be repaired.

On July 22 – the third day of the rally, the fastest pilots reached Madrid, 3019 km from the start. They were five British crews: Hubert Broad, Alan Butler (both DH-60G), Sidney Thorn (Avro Avian), John Carberry (Monocoupe 110) and H. Andrews (receiving penalty points for landing after closure), three Germans (Fritz Morzik, Willy Polte – both BFW M.23c, Reinhold Poss – Klemm L.25E) and two Frenchmen (François Arrachart, Maurice Finat – both C.193s). Four more aircraft, including Prince de Habsburgo-Borbon and Georg Pasewaldt, managed to fly to Zaragoza over the Pyrenees, but the French crews of Cornez (C.193) and MacMahon (C.232) crashed their aircraft, while trying to fly farther. The rest was spread out on the whole track, the slowest pilots being only 800–1000 km away from Berlin. Five crews dropped out on that day – apart from the mentioned ones, also one German and Spanish crew damaged their aircraft during flight to Pau. Another German pilot von Oertzen withdrew, when his passenger von Redern was killed by a propeller of their Albatros L.100 in London.

Twelve fastest crews were the lucky ones to get to Spain, because on July 23 and 24, all the remaining crews were grounded in Pau due to bad weather over the Pyrenees. Lady Bailey was the last to try to fly to Zaragoza, but she was forced to return to Pau. Due to flight prohibition, there were no penalties for not flying farther, and the return time limit was extended by 24 or 48 hours, depending on time when the crew arrived at Pau. Five crews reached Barcelona on the 23rd, and Lausanne on the next day. On July 25, the weather improved and the rest of crews was allowed to fly to Zaragoza. Meanwhile, 4 fastest pilots: Hubert Broad, Sidney Thorn, Alan Butler and Reinhold Poss, reached Breslau, and Fritz Morzik – Prague. Four crews dropped out that day, among them the best Polish pilot Franciszek Żwirko, flying RWD-4 (due to engine failure), also two German and the only Belgian crew of Jacques Maus (St. Hubert G.1). On July 26, four crews reached Warsaw (Poss, Broad, Thorn and Prince de Habsburgo-Borbon). The fastest of crews, that had been halted by the weather, reached Bern (the Pole Jerzy Bajan and two Germans Aichele and Dinort), being 700 km behind last crews of the first group, resting in Viena. On that day two German crewmen Erich Offermann and E. Jerzembski (BFW M.23c) were killed in a crash landing in Lyon, hitting an aerial mast, while the other German crew of Rudolf Neininger (Darmstadt D-18) fell into the Gulf of Lyon, but were salvaged by a passing ship.

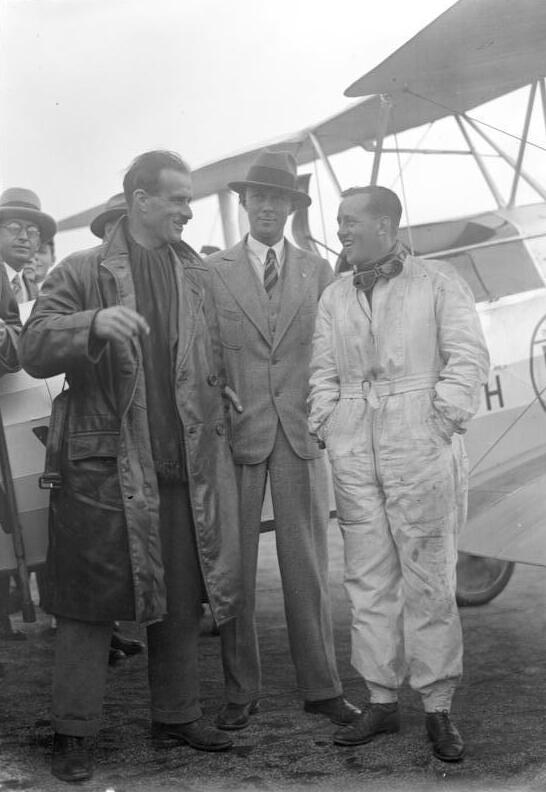
Alan Butler and Hubert Broad in Berlin-Tempelhof

On July 27 the first pilots finished in Berlin. The first came Hubert Broad, then Sidney Thorn followed closely by Reinhold Poss. In an hour, there flew also Fritz Morzik, Maurice Finat, prince Antonio de Habsburgo-Borbon, Georg Pasewaldt, H. Andrews and A.S. Butler. The fastest on the whole track was Alan Butler (DH-60G – average speed 179 km/h), but due to a propeller exchange in Poznań, he was disqualified and finished the rally off the contest. The fastest of qualified crews and the only one to gain full points, was Hubert Broad (176 km/h). On that day, 35 crews were still on the track. On July 28 seven crews reached Berlin (Willy Polte, Oskar Dinort, Winifred Spooner, Mary Bailey, John Carberry, François Arrachart, Stanisław Płonczyński), on July 29 – 9 more (among others, Theo Osterkamp, Jerzy Bajan, Johann Risztics, Robert Lusser, Oskar Notz), and the rest – on next days. The last crews finished the rally on August 1. Some crews dropped out or were disqualified in these last days as well.

The circuit over Europe appeared to be quite difficult for aircraft and pilots. Only 36 crews out of 60 finished in time. Further 6 crews completed the circuit in spite of being disqualified due to time infringement or propeller repairs, in case of not carrying a spare propeller. Among those, who dropped out, were 9 German crews (3 of them completed the circuit), 8 Polish (3 completed the circuit), 4 French, 2 Spanish and 1 British (completed the circuit). After the rally, a leader in the general classification was Hubert Broad (DH-60G, 270 points), behind him: John Carberry (Monocoupe, 268 pts), Reinhold Poss (Klemm L.25E, 264 pts), fourth was Fritz Morzik (BFW M.23c, 263 pts). The fastest German pilot was Dietrich von Massenbach (151 km/h), but he lost 10 points for regularity.

Top results of the rally:.

	Pilot	Country	Aircraft type	Registration / Starting number	Average speed	Points (in this, regularity)
1.	Hubert Broad	United Kingdom	DH-60G	G-AAHR / K3	176 km/h	270 (75)
2.	John Carberry	Canada (UK team)	Monocoupe 110	G-ABBR / K7	173 km/h	268 (75)
3.	Reinhold Poss	Germany	Klemm L.25E	D-1901 / B8	149 km/h	264 (75)
4.	Fritz Morzik	Germany	BFW M.23c	D-1883 / B3	148 km/h	263 (75)
5.	Willy Polte	Germany	BFW M.23c	D-1892 / F2	147 km/h	262 (75)
6.	Oskar Notz	Germany	Klemm L.25E	D-1902 / C1	146 km/h	261 (75)
7.	Winifred Spooner	United Kingdom	DH-60G	G-AALK / K8	165 km/h	260 (75)
8.	Dietrich von Massenbach	Germany	BFW M.23c	D-1888 / C7	151 km/h	256 (65)
9.	Ernst Krüger	Germany	BFW M.23c	D-1891 / E8	139 km/h	254 (75)
10.	Joachim von Köppen	Germany	BFW M.23c	D-1886 /C5	138 km/h	253 (75)
11.	Sidney Thorn	United Kingdom	Avro Avian	G-AAHJ / K1	155 km/h	250 (75)
12.	Oskar Dinort	Germany	Klemm L.25E	D-1900 / B9	145 km/h	250 (65)
13.	Jean R. Pierroz	Switzerland	Breda Ba.15S	CH-257 / S1	133 km/h	238 (75)
14.	Stanisław Płonczyński	Poland	RWD-2	SP-ADG / P3	128 km/h	236 (75)
15.	Edward Więckowski	Poland	RWD-2	SP-ADH / P4	127 km/h	234 (75)

Note, that lighter aircraft, like Klemm L.25, BFW M.23, RWD-2 (below 322 kg empty weight), were in the Category II, with lower cruise speed demands.

== Technical trials ==
The first was a trial of quick wings' folding, which was a feature to save place in hangars. The quickest were the crews flying DH-60s (Hubert Broad's crew folded and unfolded wings in mere 48 sec), awarded with 19 points. Crews of the German BFW M.23c scored 17-18 pts, of the Klemm L.25E – 16-17 (F. Morzik – 18 pts, O. Notz and W. Polte – 17 pts, R. Poss – 16 pts). John Carberry's Monocoupe, the Polish RWD's and the Avro Avian lost a number of points, not having folding or dismounting wings at all.

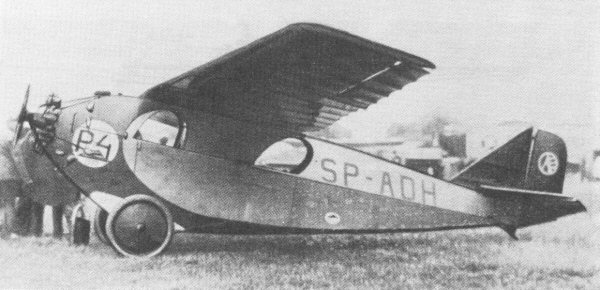
Polish RWD-2 in the Challenge markings

The next was quick engine starting test, in which equipping with a starter was extra awarded. The best Klemm L.25Ia of Theo Osterkamp, with Salmson AD.9 engine, earned 11 points. The British aircraft were handicapped by lack of starters, and the best crews – Miss Spooner and Lady Bailey, got 6 points, while H. Broad got 4 points. On the other hand, F. Morzik and R. Poss got only 7 points. On August 3 there was a fuel consumption trial on a 304 km distance. The best in fuel consumption were light RWD-2s, then German Klemms and BFWs, but 17 aircraft scored maximum of 30 pts and point differences between most of other aircraft were not big. The German Walter Spengler (Klemm L.25) was disqualified for not carrying his spare propeller aboard during this trial. Hubert Broad was still the leader, but F. Morzik was only one point behind.

On August 4 there took place a technical evaluation of competing planes' construction. Since it was a touring plane contest, such features, like comfortable cabs, side-by-side seats, rich set of controls, twin controls, safety devices (anti-fire devices and places for parachutes and water safety equipment) were also awarded. In a technical evaluation, a maximum of 104 points could be won, of a total of 230 points for technical part. Most important feature was a comfortable cab (up to 42 points). Most points was given to the American Monocoupe of John Carberry (74 pts), then to three German Junkers A50s (67-69 pts), then Breda Ba.15S and Arado L IIa (65 pts). 62 points were given to Klemm L.25E of Reinhold Poss, the same to Polish RWD-4 of Jerzy Bajan. DH-60G's of Hubert Broad and Winifred Spooner were awarded only with 56 pts, while the BFW M.23c of Fritz Morzik with 54 pts. The worst was evaluation of Hans Böhning's BFW M.23b, with 39 pts (a winning type of the previous Challenge), the second worst was Sidney Thorn's Avro Avian – 43 pts.

Additionally, in a meantime, the sports commission evaluated possibilities of dismantling the aircraft for transport (the points were added to results of wings' folding and unfolding). The German crews, flying BFW M.23c, along with F. Morzik, received additional 6 points, and Klemms L.25E, along with Poss and Notz – 3 points. No points were given to the British, Polish or French aircraft.

After these trials, leaders in a classification became the Germans: Reinhold Poss (382 pts), Oskar Notz (380 pts), Fritz Morzik (378 pts), then John Carberry (377 pts), Hubert Broad (375 pts) and Winifred Spooner (370 pts). Last trials however brought some changes to this classification.

From evening August 5 until August 7 there were carried short take-off and landing trials. Short take-off trial demanded flying over an 8.5m-high gate, which consisted of two masts with a stretched tape. Each crew had two training attempts and two trials. The German pilot Ernst Krüger was the best, starting from the lowest distance of 125.5 m, then Fritz Morzik (126.4 m) – both flying the BFW M.23c, and awarded with 30 pts. Next places were occupied also by the Germans, the sixth was Winifred Spooner flying DH-60 (142 m – 25 pts). Hubert Broad was given only 12 points (198.4 m), and John Carberry – 21 points (153.7 m).

The last was a short landing trial, from above an 8.5m-high gate. The best result, 127.3 m (30 pts), was made by the German Theo Osterkamp, flying older model of Klemm L.25 Ia, then Friedrich Siebel (Klemm L.26, 25 pts). The third was Winifred Spooner (21 pts); Fritz Morzik and Reinhold Poss had the 5th and 6th result respectively. Again Hubert Broad's result was only 8 points, and John Carberry's – 7 points. In both last trials, the Polish and French aircraft performed poorly as well.

	Take-off – best results				Landing – best results
	Pilot	Country	Aircraft	Points	Pilot	Country	Aircraft	Points
1.	Ernst Krüger	Germany	BFW M.23c	30	Theo Osterkamp	Germany	Klemm L.25 Ia	30
2.	Fritz Morzik	Germany	BFW M.23c	30	Friedrich Siebel	Germany	Klemm L.26 IIa	25
3.	Dietrich von Massenbach	Germany	BFW M.23c	28	Winifred Spooner	United Kingdom	DH.60G	21
4.	Willy Polte	Germany	BFW M.23c	25	Heinrich Benz	Germany	Klemm L.25 IVa	20
5.	Oskar Notz	Germany	Klemm L.25E	25	Fritz Morzik	Germany	BFW M.23c	19
6.	Winifred Spooner	United Kingdom	DH.60G	25	Reinhold Poss	Germany	Klemm L.25E	18
7.	Friedrich Siebel	Germany	Klemm L.26 IIa	24	Oskar Dinort	Germany	Klemm L.25E	17
8.	Reinhold Poss	Germany	Klemm L.25E	23	H. Andrews	United Kingdom	Spartan Arrow	17
9.	Theo Osterkamp	Germany	Klemm L.25 Ia	22	Willy Polte	Germany	BFW M.23c	16
10.	John Carberry	Canada	Monocoupe 110	21	Oskar Notz	Germany	Klemm L.25E	15

To sum up technical trials part: Hubert Broad's advantage over other competitors was decreasing in following trials, then he lost several places after the aircraft evaluation and wings' folding tests. After poor take-off and landing results, he occupied the 8th position eventually. Due to lack of folding wings and engine starter, John Carberry fell from the 2nd to 11th position, only to regain this position thanks to best aircraft evaluation. However, mediocre take-off and landing results gave him the 6th place overall. Technical part saw a duel between Reinhold Poss and Fritz Morzik, occupying the 3rd and 4th places respectively after the circuit part. Poss took a lead, while Morzik fell to the 5th position after the aircraft evaluation, but Morzik's superb take-off and landing made him a winner, while Poss took the 2nd place. Oskar Notz and Winifred Spooner both performed very well, improving their positions by three places (from the 7th and 8th place respectively), while Willy Polte improved it only by one step (from the 6th position). Winifred Spooner performed good take-off and landing as the only British competitor and the only flying DH.60. Other competitors, who managed to improve their positions much in this part, in spite of flying older aircraft, were Theo Osterkamp (from the 16th to 11th place), Robert Lusser (from the 18th to 14th place) and Friedrich Siebel (from 25th to 18th place). Among the competitors, who lost most position, were Edward Więckowski (from 15th to 21st place), S. Thorn and A. Gothe.

== Results ==
After all trials, on August 8 there was a closing ceremony. The first three places were occupied by the Germans, flying specially developed variants of sports aircraft, the winner being Fritz Morzik again. On the fourth place was Miss Winifred Spooner, who managed to improve her position since the rally part, thanks to skills in technical trials, which were not favourable for the British aircraft.

Only 35 crews of 60 completed the contest, among them 20 German, 6 British, 4 Polish, 2 Swiss, 2 French, 1 Spanish:

	Pilot	Country	Aircraft type	Registration / Starting number		Points: rally + technical = total
1.	Fritz Morzik	Germany	BFW M.23c	D-1883	B3	263 + 164 = 427
2.	Reinhold Poss	Germany	Klemm L.25E	D-1901	B8	264 + 159 = 423
3.	Oskar Notz	Germany	Klemm L.25E	D-1902	C1	261 + 158 = 419
4.	Winifred Spooner	United Kingdom	DH-60G	G-AALK	K8	260 + 156 = 416
5.	Willy Polte	Germany	BFW M.23c	D-1892	F2	262 + 147 = 409
6.	John Carberry	Canada (UK team)	Monocoupe 110	G-ABBR	K7	268 + 137 = 405
7.	Dietrich von Massenbach	Germany	BFW M.23c	D-1888	C7	256 + 142 = 398
8.	Hubert Broad	United Kingdom	DH-60G	G-AAHR	K3	270 + 125 = 395
9.	Ernst Krüger	Germany	BFW M.23c	D-1891	E8	254 + 140 = 394
10.	Oskar Dinort	Germany	Klemm L.25E	D-1900	B9	250 + 135 = 385
11.	Theo Osterkamp	Germany	Klemm L.25 Ia	D-1713	B7	226 + 158 = 384
12.	Joachim von Köppen	Germany	BFW M.23c	D-1886	C5	253 + 130 = 383
13.	Robert Lusser	Germany	Klemm L.26 Va	D-1716	A2	218 + 145 = 363
14.	Jean R. Pierroz	Switzerland	Breda Ba-15S	CH-257	S1	238 + 124 = 362
15.	Johann Risztics	Germany	Junkers A 50ce	D-1618	A1	195 + 166 = 361
16.	Sidney Thorn	United Kingdom	Avro Avian	G-AAHJ	K1	250 + 88 = 338
17.	Maurice Finat	France	Caudron C.193	F-AJSI	M2	214 + 123 = 337
18.	Otto Peschke	Germany	Arado L.IIa	D-1875	C9	207 + 129 = 336
19.	Stanisław Płonczyński	Poland	RWD-2	SP-ADG	P3	236 + 100 = 336
20.	Friedrich Siebel	Germany	Klemm L.26 IIa	D-1773	E6	171 + 164 = 335
21.	Edward Więckowski	Poland	RWD-2	SP-ADH	P4	234 + 95 = 329
22.	Georg Pasewaldt	Germany	Arado L.IIa	D-1876	D1	180 + 138 = 318
23.	Charles Kolp	Switzerland	Klemm VL.25 Va	CH-258	S2	189 + 125 = 314
24.	François Arrachart	France	Caudron C.193	F-AJSH	L3	198 + 113 = 311
25.	Otto von Waldau	Germany	BFW M.23c	D-1887	C6	165 + 142 = 307
26.	Heinrich Benz	Germany	Klemm L.25 IVa	D-1877	E1	162 + 142 = 304
27.	Alfred Gothe	Germany	Junkers A 50ci	D-1863	E2	179 + 105 = 284
28.	Egloff von Freyberg	Germany	BFW M.23c	D-1884	C3	153 + 120 = 273
29.	Waldemar Roeder	Germany	Junkers A 50ce	D-1862	A8	150 + 121 = 271
30.	Antonio Habsburg-Bourbon	Kingdom of Spain	DH-60G	M-CKAA	T5	144 + 101 = 245
31.	Mary Bailey	United Kingdom	DH-60G	G-AAEE	K6	132 + 103 = 235
32.	Jerzy Bajan	Poland	RWD-4	SP-ADM	P2	120 + 103 = 223
33.	Ignacy Giedgowd	Poland	PZL.5	SP-ACW	O1	87 + 83 = 170
34.	Hans Böhning	Germany	BFW M.23b	D-1889	D8	80 + 81 = 161
35.	H.S. Andrews	United Kingdom	Spartan Arrow	G-AAWZ	K4	51 + 109 = 160

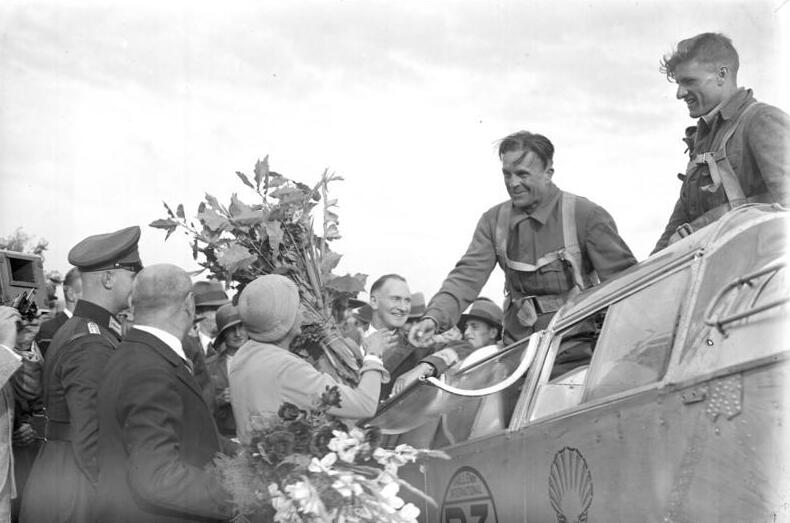
Fritz Morzik in his BFW M.23c after the rally

The 1st place was awarded with 100,000 French francs, the 2nd place with 50,000 FRF, the 3rd place with 25,000 FRF, the 4th place with 15,000 FRF, from 5th to 20th place – with 10,000 FRF.

Due to the German victory, the next Challenge 1932 was organized in Germany as well. The next Challenge, due to regulations' changes, turned out to be more difficult contest. For 1932 contest, most countries developed advanced sport aircraft, with high technical performance.

== See also ==
- Challenge International de Tourisme 1929
- Challenge International de Tourisme 1932
- Challenge International de Tourisme 1934
