= Léna Bernstein =

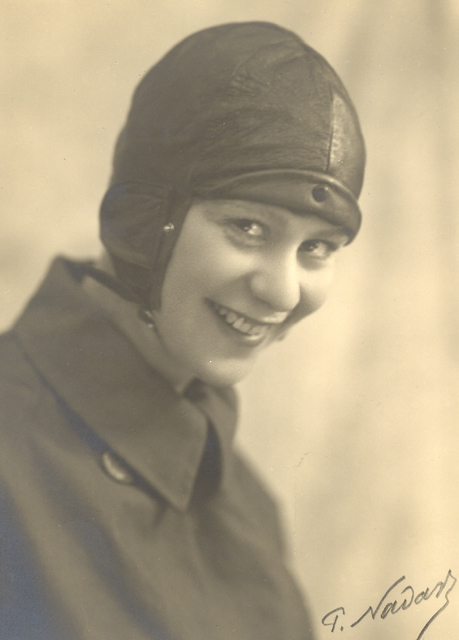
- Studio portrait of Léna Bernstein c. 1929
- Born: January 9, 1906; Leipzig, German Empire
- Died: June 1932; Biskra
- Occupation: Aviator (Aviatrix)
- Years active: 1928–1932
- Known for: First woman to fly across the Mediterranean Sea

Léna Bernstein (January 9, 1906 – June 1932) was the first woman to fly across the Mediterranean Sea. She also held flight records for women's endurance and flight distance. She was of Russian-Jewish descent.

== Flight career ==
Bernstein began her career attending the Civil Flight School in Aulnat. She began by flying a Potez VIII, before eventually she borrowed a Caudron C.109 from aviator Maurice Finat.

On August 20, 1929, she set her first record, making the longest straight-line flight, crossing the Mediterranean Sea, with a distance of 2,268 km (1,409 mi).

In May 1930, she set the record for women's flight endurance with a flight that lasted 35 hours and 45 minutes. She used her Farman F192 for the record flight. This was also the global endurance record for a solo pilot, beating the previous record-holder, Charles Lindbergh. Maryse Bastié would surpass her record in September of that year.

In December, she was forced to make an emergency landing at Baghdad after being caught in a sandstorm. Because the airfield was not lit, along with bad conditions, her plane was damaged during landing. This forced her and her accompanying engineer, Mr. Guitton, to return to France and cancel their planned flight to the far east.

== Death ==
In 1932, she made an emergency landing in Biskra due to a storm. On June 6, 1932, she left her hotel. Three days later, her body was found. Her cause of death is unknown.

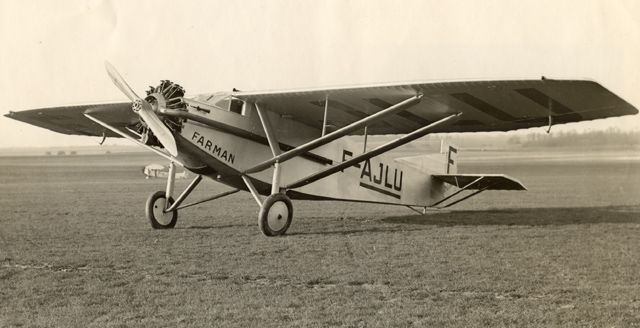
Bernstein's Farman F192

== Bibliography ==
- Moulin, Jacques & Cony, Christophe (May 2001). "L'aviation était toute sa vie: Léna Bernstein" [Aviation was Her Whole Life: Léna Bernstein]. Avions: Toute l'Aéronautique et son histoire (in French) (98): 59–60. ISSN 1243-8650.
