= C109 =

C-109 may refer to:

- C-109 Liberator Express, a conversion of the American B-24 Liberator bomber as a cargo aircraft
- Caudron C.109, a light utility aircraft built in France in the late 1920s
- CC-109 Cosmopolitan, a Canadian turboprop version of the Convairliner for use as a transport by the RCAF
