= Hubert Broad =

British First World War aviator

Hubert Stanford Broad
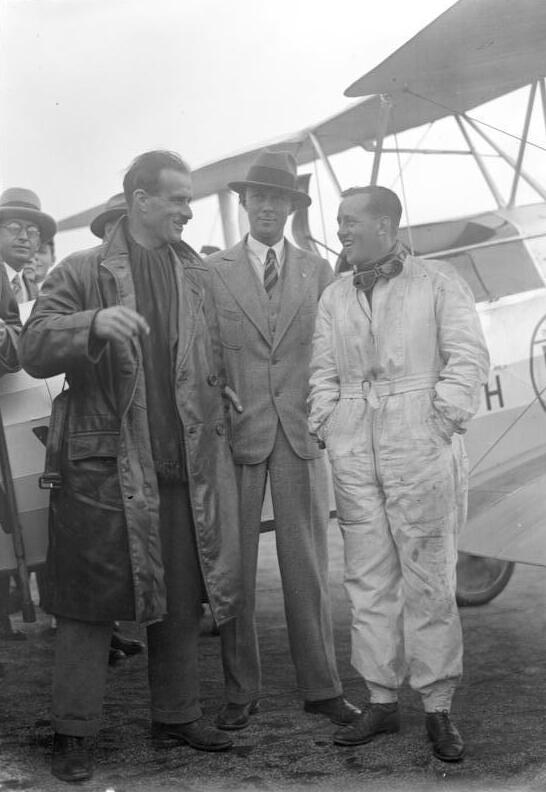
- Broad (right) and A. Butler at Berlin-Tempelhof during Challenge International (1930)
- Born: 18 May 1897; Watford, Hertfordshire, UK
- Died: 30 July 1975 (aged 78); Basingstoke, Hampshire, UK
- Occupations: Military & civilian test pilot
- Awards: MBE; AFC

Captain Hubert Standford Broad, MBE, AFC (1897–1975) was a British First World War aviator and noted test pilot.

== Early life ==
Born at Aston Lodge, Watford, Hertfordshire on 18 May 1897, the son of Thomas and Amelia Broad (née Coles), his father was a solicitor; he was educated at St. Lawrence College in Ramsgate, Kent.

== RNAS aviator ==
Broad learned to fly in 1915 at the Hall School of Flying at Hendon. Flying a single-engined Caudron he received Pilot Certificate No. 2,044, after which he joined the Royal Naval Air Service at Eastchurch. After training, he was posted to operations with No. 3 Squadron RNAS, based at Dunkirk, France, flying the Sopwith Pup. Broad was wounded in the neck during one First World War mission escorting bombers and returned to England to become an instructor whilst he recuperated.

For his second operational tour, Broad was seconded to No. 46 Squadron of the Royal Flying Corps flying the Sopwith Camel. At the end of the Great War, Broad became an instructor at the Fighter Pilots Flying School, Fairlop.

== Test and sports pilot ==
After leaving the RNAS Broad flew joy-riding aircraft for Avro and in 1920 he flew joy-riding flights in the United States with two Avro seaplanes. In 1921 he came first in the Aerial Derby air race around London, flying a Sopwith Camel. This gained the attention of de Havilland which took him on in October 1921 as chief test pilot at Stag Lane. Given the scarcity of test pilots he was tasked with flying a wide variety of De Havilland aircraft as well as Handley Pages and Glosters.

At the 1925 Schneider Trophy Broad was the sole British entrant following a number of pre-race accidents. Flying a Gloster III seaplane he came second to an American Army test pilot called James Doolittle.

At de Havilland, Broad undertook many demonstration flights and entered air races and competitions to show off de Havilland aircraft. In 1926 he won the King's Cup Air Race in a de Havilland Moth. In 1928 he took part in the International Light Aircraft Contest in France, finishing in 3rd place. The next year, he came second in the F.A.I. Tourist Plane Contest – Challenge International de Tourisme 1929. In the subsequent Challenge International de Tourisme 1930, he was 8th overall (he completed the rally section in 1st place).

In 1935 he left de Havilland to work with the Royal Aircraft Establishment as a test pilot. He published a book in 1939 about flying – Flying wisdom; a book of practical experiences and their lessons. In 1940 he returned to industry as chief production test pilot for Hawker Aircraft. He was responsible for test flying the Hawker single-seat fighter planes as they left the production line. He was appointed MBE in 1944 for his work as a Hawker test pilot.

Captain Broad died in 1975 at home in Basingstoke; during his career, he completed 7,500 flying hours in 200 different types of aircraft.

== Personal life ==
Broad appears to have had an affair with Beryl Markham, the first aviator to fly solo across the Atlantic from east to west; he was named by Mansfield Markham as a co-respondent in his 1937 divorce from Beryl.

== See also ==
- Order of the British Empire
