= Friedrich-Wilhelm Morzik =

Luftwaffe general of Nazi Germany

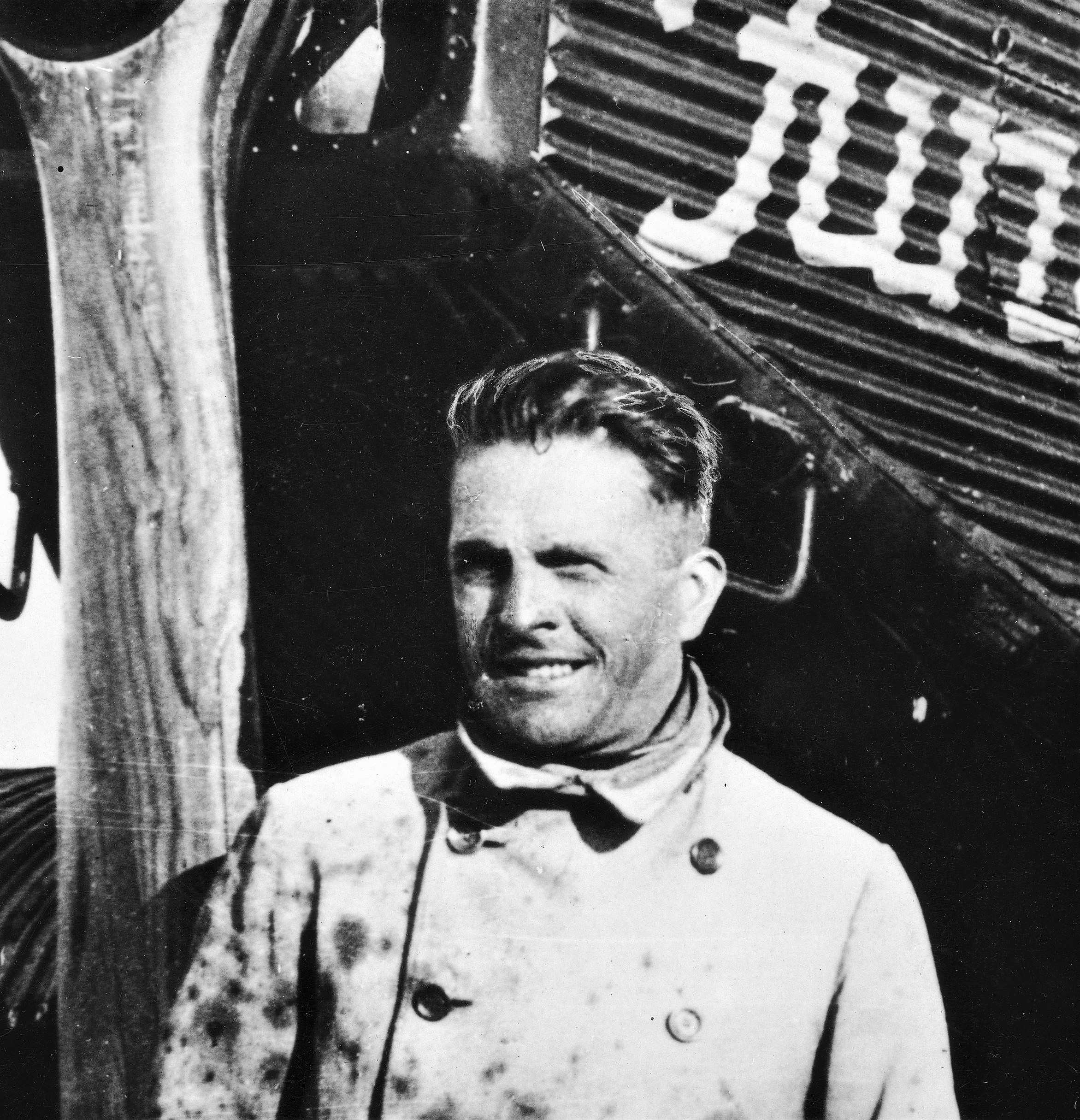
- Friedrich-Wilhelm Morzik
- Born: 10 December 1891
- Died: 17 June 1985 (aged 93)
- Military career
- Allegiance: Nazi Germany
- Branch: Luftwaffe (1934–45)
- Service years: 1909–1919; 1934–1945
- Rank: Generalmajor
- Conflicts: World War II
- Awards: Knight's Cross of the Iron Cross

Signature
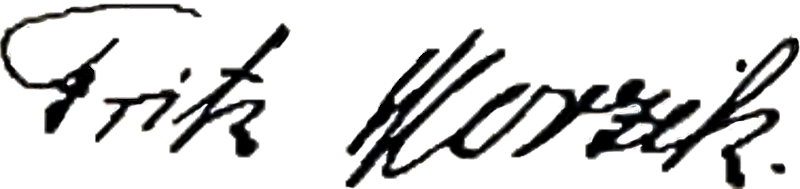

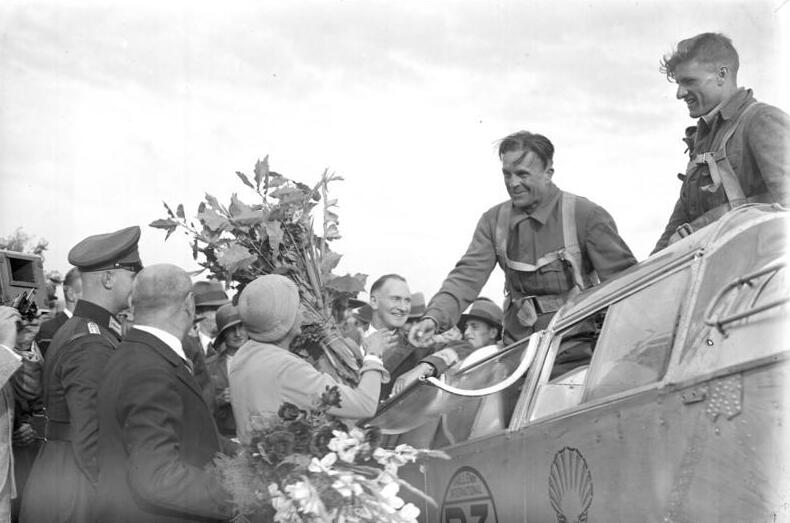
The winner of the Challenge International de Tourisme 1930, Morzik at Berlin Tempelhof Airport, July 1930

Friedrich-Wilhelm Morzik (10 December 1891 – 17 June 1985) was a general in the Luftwaffe of Nazi Germany during World War II. He was a recipient of the Knight's Cross of the Iron Cross.

Morzik was a winner in the first International Tourist Plane Contest Challenge and the second Challenge in 1930. In 1935 he started service in the Air Force (Luftwaffe), as a commandant of pilots' school. In World War II he became a head of Luftwaffe Transport Command, in a rank of Generalmajor.

After the war he wrote a detailed story of German transport aviation during the war: Die deutschen Transportflieger im Zweiten Weltkrieg (Frankfurt am Main, 1966) and German Air Force Airlift Operations (New York: Arno Press, 1968).

== Awards and decorations ==
- Knight's Cross of the Iron Cross on 16 April 1942 as Oberst and Geschwaderkommodore of Kampfgeschwader z.b.V. 1 and Lufttransportführer Ost of Luftflotte 1
