= PZL.5 =

Polish two-seat touring and sports aircraft of 1930

PZL-5
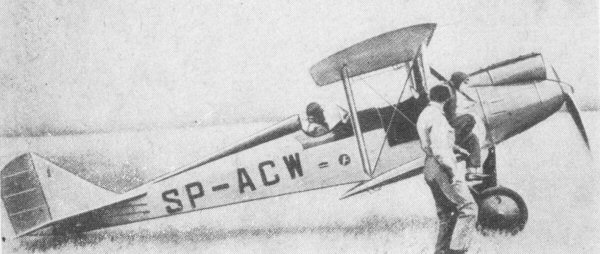

General information
- Type: Sports plane
- Manufacturer: PZL
- Number built: 15

History
- Manufactured: 1930-1932
- Introduction date: 1930
- First flight: May 1930
- Retired: 1939

The PZL-5 was a Polish two-seat touring and sports aircraft of 1930 constructed and produced by the PZL.

== Design and development ==
The aircraft was designed in 1929 by an amateur designer Władysław Kozłowski. It was a wooden biplane, similar to de Havilland Gipsy Moth. The PZL State Aviation Works in Warsaw took over the design, searching for an aircraft to participate in a contest for a trainer aircraft, announced by the LOPP paramilitary organization (Air- and Anti-Gas Defense League). Kozłowski worked out a documentation, with a help of PZL bureau and fitted the example with a more powerful 100 hp Gipsy I engine, instead of a planned 85 hp version. The first prototype of PZL-5 was built and flown in May 1930, followed by two pre-series aircraft in June 1930, built on the factory's initiative specially for the International Touring Competition 1930 (Challenge) (registration SP-ACW and SP-ACX).

After trials, the design was modified, receiving the designation PZL-5a. Among other changes, the fuselage and wings were shortened a bit, and the nose was modified. The first prototype was rebuilt this way, using a 94 hp Cirrus III engine, receiving the markings: SP-AEE. In 1931, a series of 11 aircraft were built, for aeroclubs' orders. They received markings from SP-AFF to SP-AFP and SP-AGF. Most had Gipsy I engines. A price was 9,600 złoty (£380) for an airframe, plus 14,000 złoty (£560) for a Gipsy I engine.

The PZL-5 was too difficult to fly to be a basic trainer, consequently, a modified variant PZL.5bis was designed and built in 1932. It had a 120 hp Gipsy II engine, longer wings and fuselage, larger cockpit openings, changed tail and landing gear. The only prototype was flown in July 1932. It took part in a contest for the basic trainer aircraft for the Polish Air Force, but it was beaten by the RWD-8.

A further development of the PZL-5bis was the WK-3, built privately by Władysław Kozłowski and flown in 1933. The PZL also proposed in 1930 to build a trainer seaplane under a proposed designation PZL.8 (not to be confused with the PZL P.8), but the Polish Navy was not interested and it was not built.

=== Description ===
Wooden construction braced biplane. Fuselage plywood (front) and canvas (tail) covered. Rectangular wings with rounded ends, canvas covered. Crew of two, sitting in tandem in open cockpits with windshields. Cockpits with dual controls (a front cockpit had only basic set of controls). The Flight magazine described the PZL.5 as: a very solid looking edition of a cross between the Avian and a Moth.

Specifications included: 4-cylinder air-cooled straight engine in front: 100 hp de Havilland Gipsy I or 94 hp Cirrus III. Two-blade wooden propeller Szomański of a fixed pitch. Conventional landing gear, with a rear skid. Fuel tank 96 L in upper central wing section. Fuel consumption - 23.5 L/hour.

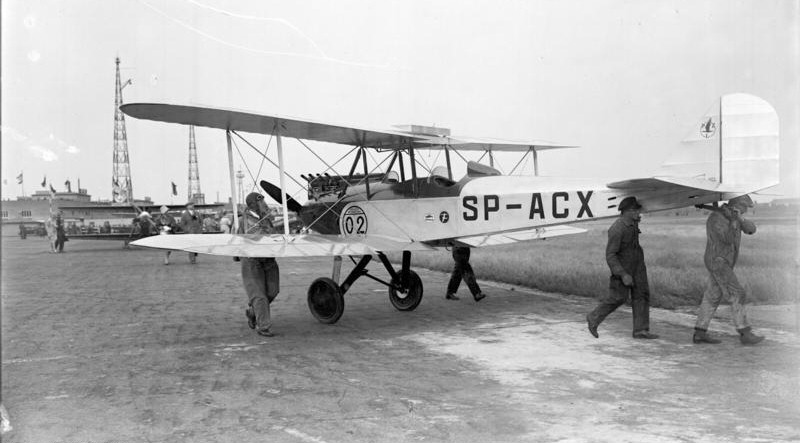
Bolesław Orliński's PZL-5 during the Challenge 1930

== Operational history ==
Two pre-series aircraft took part in the International Touring Competition (Challenge International de Tourisme) in July 1930. Only Ignacy Giedgowd completed the contest flying the PZL.5 SP-ACW, on the 33rd place (for 35 classified and 60 starting crews). Bolesław Orliński had to withdraw in Spain due to engine failure, flying SP-ACX.

A total of 11 PZL-5as and the prototype were bought by local aeroclubs in Warsaw, Katowice, Kraków, Poznań and Vilnius and intensively used for sports, training and touring. Along with pre-series aircraft, they were used in numerous Polish aviation competitions, with some success (for example, 2nd place in the 2nd South-Western Poland Rally in 1930 and the 1st place in the 5th Rally in 1933).

In 1932, SP-ACX was modified to glider towing and fitted with additional fuel tanks, for 8 hours of flight.

SP-AFG was scrapped in 1935, SP-AFH crashed in 1932, SP-AFL crashed in 1935, SP-AFM was damaged in 1933 and scrapped, SP-AFP crashed in 1935. About half survived until 1939, they were longest serving Polish aircraft of wooden construction. Some were bought by private owners. After the outbreak of World War II, SP-ACX was evacuated to Romania.

== Operators ==
- Poland
- Romania

== Specifications (PZL-5a) ==
Data from

General characteristics

- Crew: 1
- Capacity: 1 student or passenger
- Length: 6.7 m (22 ft 0 in)
- Wingspan: 8.4 m (27 ft 7 in)
- Height: 2.53 m (8 ft 4 in)
- Wing area: 21.8 m^{2} (235 sq ft)
- Empty weight: 431 kg (950 lb)
- Gross weight: 676 kg (1,490 lb)
- Max takeoff weight: 745 kg (1,642 lb)
- Powerplant: 1 × de Havilland Gipsy I 4-cyl. air-cooled in-line piston engine, 75 kW (100 hp)
- Propellers: 2-bladed fixed pitch propeller

Performance

- Maximum speed: 164 km/h (102 mph, 89 kn)
- Cruise speed: 130 km/h (81 mph, 70 kn)
- Stall speed: 70 km/h (43 mph, 38 kn)
- Range: 530 km (330 mi, 290 nmi)
- Service ceiling: 3,715 m (12,188 ft)
- Rate of climb: 3.4 m/s (670 ft/min)
- Wing loading: 31 kg/m^{2} (6.3 lb/sq ft)
- Take-off run: 120 m (390 ft)

== See also ==
Aircraft of comparable role, configuration, and era

- de Havilland Gipsy Moth
- Avro Avian
- Spartan Arrow
- CANT 26
- Albatros L 82
