= Arado L I =

L I
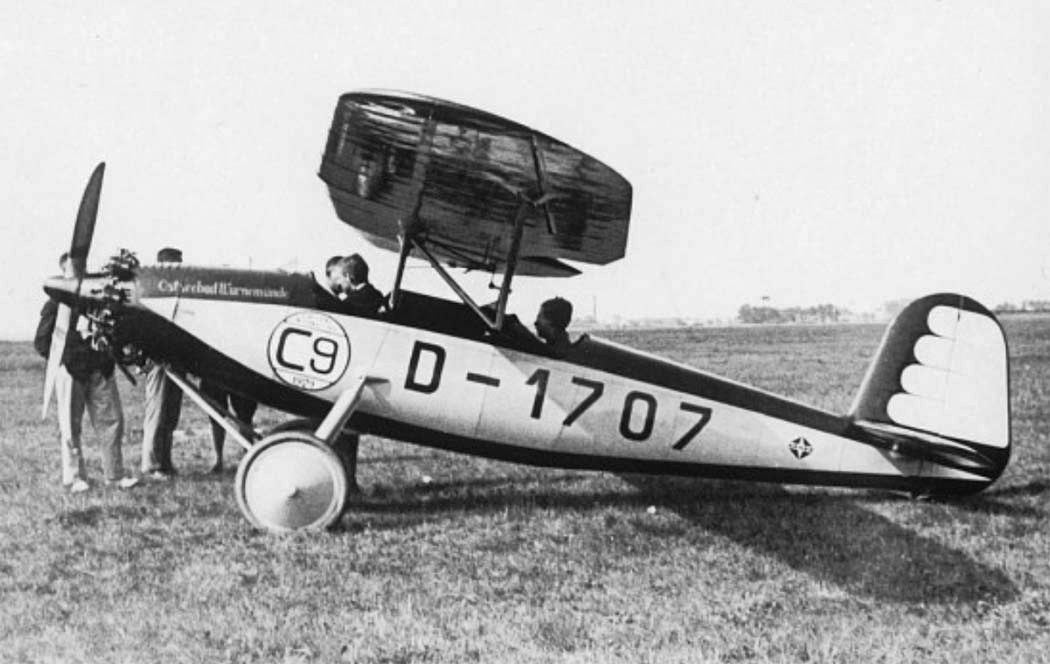
- Arado L 1 aircraft in 1929

General information
- Type: Sports plane
- Manufacturer: Arado
- Designer: Hermann Hofmann
- Number built: 1

History
- First flight: 1929

The Arado L I was a two-seat parasol-wing sport monoplane built in Germany in 1929, in order to compete in the Europa Rundflug that year. During the fuel consumption trials, the L 1 made a forced landing and was disqualified from the contest. Bringing the aircraft back to Paris, designer Hermann Hofmann performed some aerobatics over the airfield and was killed when it crashed.

== Specifications ==
General characteristics

- Crew: one pilot
- Capacity: one passenger
- Length: 6.00 m (19 ft 8 in)
- Wingspan: 10.00 m (32 ft 10 in)
- Height: 2.30 m (7 ft 7 in)
- Wing area: 14.5 m^{2} (156 sq ft)
- Empty weight: 270 kg (595 lb)
- Gross weight: 500 kg (1,100 lb)
- Powerplant: 1 × Salmson 9AD , 30 kW (40 hp)

Performance

- Maximum speed: 140 km/h (87 mph, 76 kn)
