= Klemm Kl 25 =

1920s German light aircraft

Kl 25
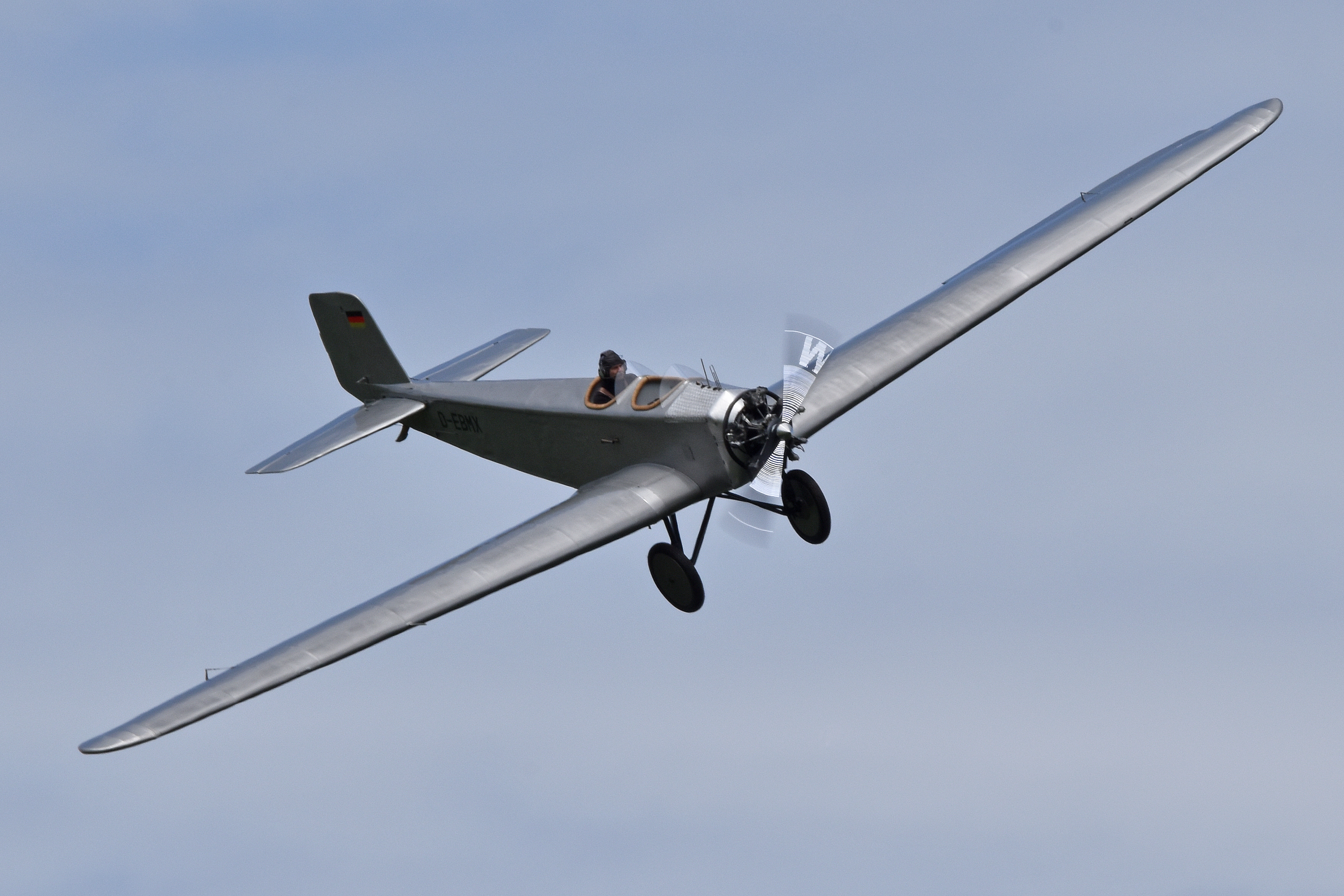

General information
- Type: Training plane
- Manufacturer: Klemm
- Number built: About 720 (including American-built aircraft)

History
- First flight: 1928
- Variant: Klemm Kl 26

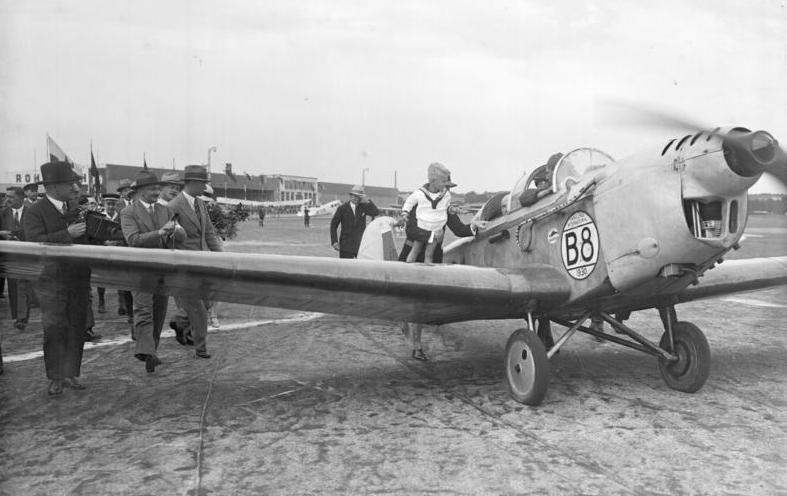
L 25E during the Europa Rundflug 1930 (pilot Reinhold Poss)

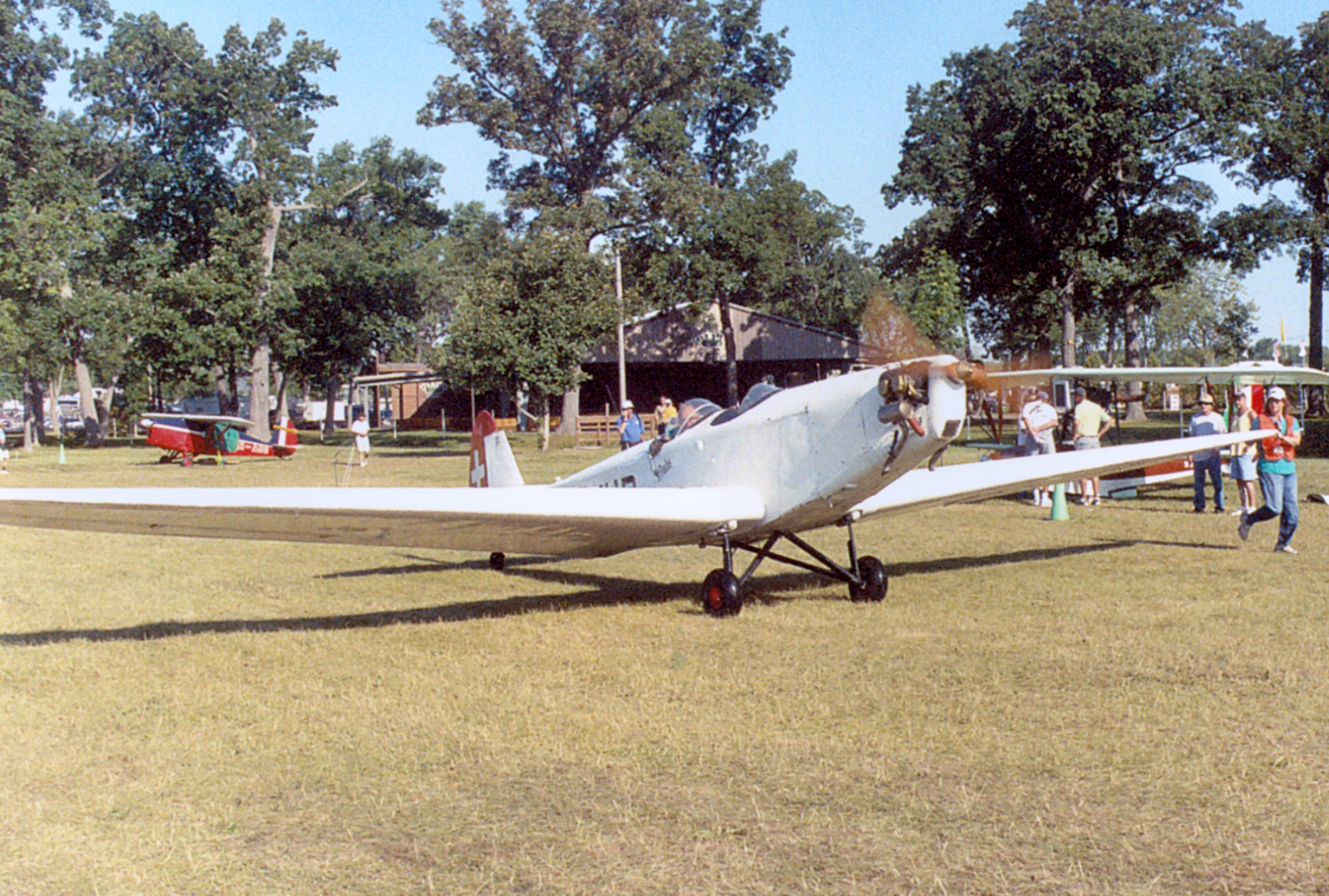
1934 L25-DII

Klemm L 25, later Klemm Kl 25 is a successful German light leisure, sports and training monoplane aircraft, developed in 1928. More than 600 aircraft were built, and manufacturing licenses were sold to the United Kingdom and the United States.

== Design and construction ==
With a low cantilever wing, fixed landing gear, and two open cockpits, the aircraft was developed by Hanns Klemm, who used his previous design, the Daimler L20, as a starting point. It first flew on a 20 hp (15 kW) Daimler F7502 engine. About 30 different versions of the Kl 25 were made, and these were equipped with engines ranging from 32 to 70 kW (43 to 94 hp). The fuselage was covered with plywood.

Depending on the model, the aircraft's weight was 620 to 720 kg (1,367 to 1,587 lb), and it had a 10.5 to 13 m (34 to 43 ft) wingspan. Takeoff was achieved at only 50 km/h (31 mph) and the maximum speed was between 150 and 160 km/h (93 and 99 mph).

In relation to similar aircraft of the time, assembly was very easy, and this made it a very popular aircraft. According to the sales brochures, only 25% of the engine's power was needed to keep the aircraft flying, compared to biplanes of the period, which required 50% engine power.

About 600 were built in Germany between 1929 and 1936, serving with various flight training organizations, with either wheels, skis, or floats. 15 were sold to Britain before the Second World War, being fitted with a variety of domestic engines, while 28 more were built by British Klemm Aeroplane Company as the B.A. Swallow. Production in the United States was carried out by the Aeromarine-Klemm Company which enjoyed moderate success, as well as developing models for the American market, in isolation from the parent company, with about 120 built of all models.

== Operation ==
Klemm L 25s took part in many competitions, among others in International Touring Aircraft Competitions (Europa Rundflug) in 1929 (best 4th place) and in 1930 (best 2nd and 3rd places, L 25E variant).

== Variants ==
NB, list not complete
Germany
L 25 a
Built between 1927 and 1929, equipped with a 22 PS (21.7 hp; 16.2 kW) Daimler F 7502 engine
L 25 I
Built between 1928 and 1929, equipped with a 45 PS (44.4 hp; 33.1 kW) Salmson AD.9 engine
L 25 Ia
L 25 IW
Floatplane version of the Ia, with two wooden floats supported by steel-tube struts in inverted 'W' configuration
L 25 b
Built in 1931, equipped with a 22 PS (21.7 hp; 16.2 kW) Daimler F 7502 engine
L 25 b VII
Built in 1931, equipped with a 60 PS (59.2 hp; 44.1 kW) Hirth HM 60 engine
L 25 d II
Built in 1933, equipped with an 88 PS (86.8 hp; 64.7 kW) Siemens-Halske Sh 13a engine

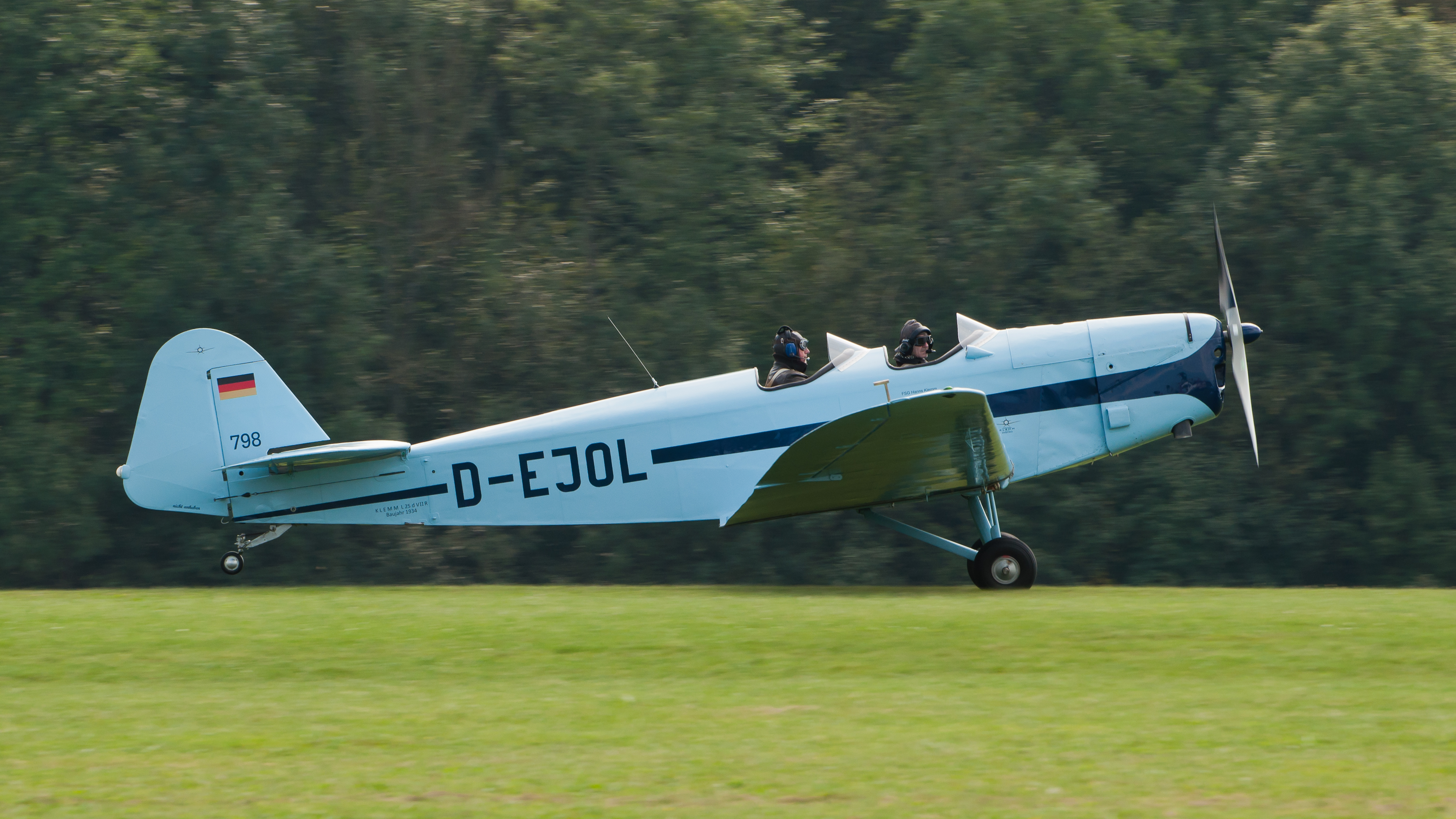
Klemm L.25 d VII R built in 1934

L 25 d VII
Equipped with an 80 PS (78.9 hp; 58.8 kW) Hirth HM 60R engine
L 25 IVa
Equipped with Armstrong Siddeley Genet engine
VL 25 Va
Three-seater variant, with a closed canopy, equipped with 103 PS (101.6 hp; 75.8 kW) Argus As 8 straight engine
L 25 Ve
(see L 25E) For Europa Rundflug 1930
L 25E
(L 25 Ve) Special competition variant (E for Europa Rundflug 1930), with a closed canopy, smaller span, equipped with a 103 PS (101.6 hp; 75.8 kW) Argus As 8

United Kingdom
British Klemm Aeroplane Company B.K. Swallow
British Aircraft Manufacturing Co. B.A. Swallow II

United States
Aeromarine-Klemm AKL-25
Aeromarine-Klemm AKL-70
Aeromarine-Klemm Model 70 Trainer

== Operators ==
Bolivia

- Bolivian Air Force

Finland

- Finnish Air Force

Hungary

- Royal Hungarian Air Force

Peru

- Peruvian Air Force

Romania

- Royal Romanian Air Force

South Africa

- South African Air Force

== Specifications (L 25.Ia) ==
Data from Jane's All the World's Aircraft 1931'

General characteristics

- Crew: 1
- Capacity: 1
- Length: 7.3 m (23 ft 11 in)
- Wingspan: 13 m (42 ft 8 in)
- Height: 1.75 m (5 ft 9 in)
- Wing area: 20.0 m^{2} (215 sq ft)
- Airfoil: Göttingen 387
- Empty weight: 285 kg (628 lb)
- Gross weight: 500 kg (1,102 lb)
- Fuel capacity: 50 L (13 US gal; 11 imp gal) in a forward fuselage tank
- Powerplant: 1 × Salmson AD.9 9-cylinder air-cooled radial piston engine, 30 kW (40 hp)
- Propellers: 2-bladed fixed-pitch propeller

Performance

- Maximum speed: 140 km/h (87 mph, 76 kn)
- Landing speed: 50 km/h (31 mph; 27 kn)
- Range: 650 km (400 mi, 350 nmi)
- Service ceiling: 6,500 m (21,300 ft)
- Time to altitude: 1,000 m (3,300 ft) in 8 minutes
- Wing loading: 25 kg/m^{2} (5.1 lb/sq ft)
- Power/mass: 0.6 kW/kg (0.36 hp/lb)

== See also ==
Related development

- Klemm Kl 26

Related lists

- List of military aircraft of Germany

== Bibliography ==
- Gerdessen, Frederik. "Estonian Air Power 1918 – 1945". Air Enthusiast, No. 18, April – July 1982. pp. 61–76. ISSN 0143-5450.
