= Caudron C.230 =

Sporting, touring and trainer aircraft

C.230
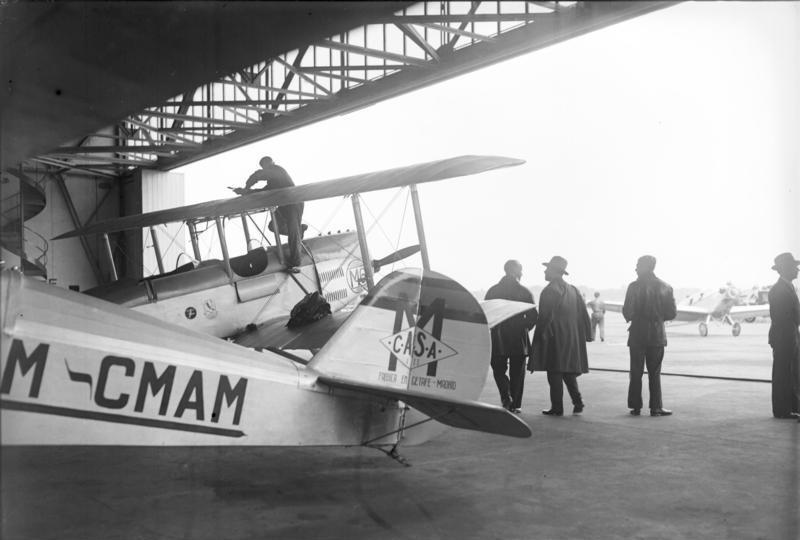
- C.232 partly visible in a background, during the Challenge 1930 competition

General information
- Type: Touring
- Manufacturer: Caudron
- Designer: Paul Deville
- Number built: 15

History
- First flight: 1930
- Variant: Caudron C.270

The Caudron C.230 was a sporting, touring and trainer aircraft produced in France in 1930. It was a conventional biplane with single-bay, unstaggered wings of equal span. The pilot and a single passenger sat in tandem open cockpits. It featured a wooden fuselage with plywood skin.

Fifteen examples were produced before the much improved and very successful Caudron C.270 Luciole series appeared.

== Variants ==
Data from:

- C.230 - first production version with Salmson 7Ac radial engine (15 built)
- C.232 - version with Renault 4Pb engine (50 built)
  - C.232/2 - as C.232 with wheel brakes (3 built)
  - C.232/4 - as C.232/2 with improved equipment (7 built)
- C.233 - prototype for testing of Michel AM-16 engine, later re-engined with Salmson 7Ac, reverting to C.230 designation. (1 built)
- C.235 - version with Argus As 8R engine for French Air Ministry (Ministere de l'Air) tests (1 built)

== Specifications (C.232) ==
Data from Aviafrance, Flight, All-Aero

General characteristics

- Crew: 2
- Capacity: 50 kg (110 lb) luggage
- Length: 7.87 m (25 ft 10 in)
- Wingspan: 11 m (36 ft 1 in)
- Wing area: 24 m^{2} (260 sq ft)
- Empty weight: 420 kg (926 lb)
- Gross weight: 700 kg (1,543 lb)
- Fuel capacity: 85 L (22.5 US gal; 18.7 imp gal)
- Powerplant: 1 × Renault 4Pb 4-cylinder inverted air-cooled inline piston engine, 71 kW (95 hp)
- Propellers: 2-bladed fixed-pitch wooden propeller

Performance

- Maximum speed: 165 km/h (103 mph, 89 kn)
- Cruise speed: 130 km/h (81 mph, 70 kn)
- Range: 500 km (310 mi, 270 nmi)
- Endurance: 4 hours
- Service ceiling: 4,000 m (13,000 ft)
- Time to altitude: 4,300 m (14,100 ft) in 1 hour
