= Caudron C.190 =

French two-seat low-wing single-engine sports plane

C.190/191/192/193
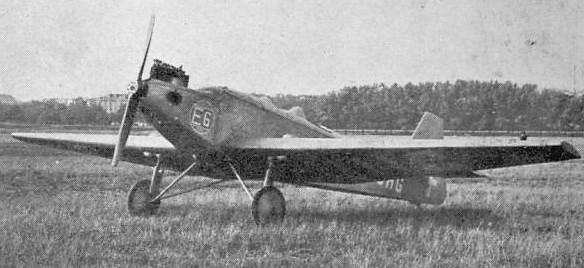
- C.193

General information
- Type: sports plane
- Manufacturer: Caudron

History
- First flight: 1929

The Caudron C.190 was a French two-seat low-wing single-engine sports plane, built by the French aeroplane manufacturer Caudron in the late 1920s. The only variant of the C.190 family (C.190/191/192/193) to be built in series was the C.193.

== Operational history ==
Information in publications is vague, but at least six C.193s were produced (reg. F-AJHG, F-AJOB, F-AJSG, F-AJSH, F-AJSI, F-AJSJ) and one Salmson-powered C.192 (F-AJHF). One aircraft, C.193 F-AJSI, was sold to Great Britain in 1930 and registered as G-ABFX, but returned to France in 1931 to be registered as F-ALLJ.

In 1929, aircraft F-AJHF and F-AJHG participated in the Challenge 1929 international touring plane contest, and one of them completed it in 28th place, flown by Raymond Delmotte

In 1930, three C.193s participated in the Challenge 1930 international touring plane contest (F-AJSG, F-AJSH, F-AJSI), Maurice Finat completing it in 17th place and François Arrachart in 24th place.

== Variants ==
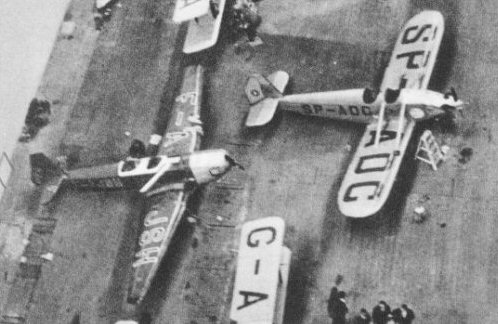
C.193 (on the left, the other is PWS-51) during the Challenge 1930

- C.190 - first variant, with 80 hp (58.8 kW) Renault straight engine
- C.191 - variant with 95 hp (69.8 kW) Salmson 7AC radial engine
- C.192 - variant with 95 hp (69.8 kW) Salmson 7AC radial engine
- C.193 - series variant, with 98 hp (72 kW) Renault 4Pb straight engine

== Specifications (C.193) ==
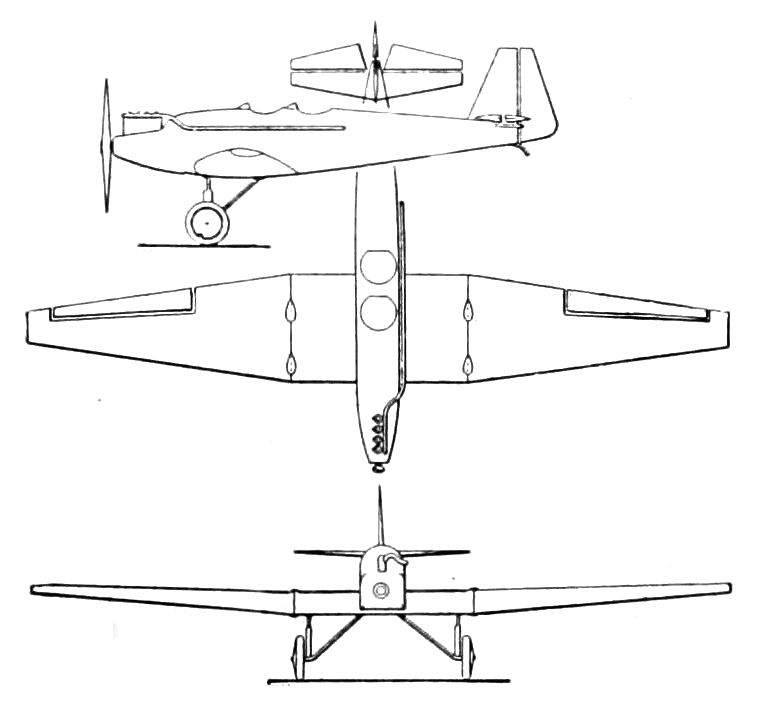
Caudron C.190 3-view drawing from Aero Digest December 1929

Data from Krzyżan, M. 1988

General characteristics

- Length: 7.48 m (24 ft 6 in)
- Wingspan: 11.5 m (37 ft 9 in)
- Height: 2.5 m (8 ft 2 in)
- Wing area: 13.6 m^{2} (146 sq ft)
- Empty weight: 440 kg (970 lb)
- Gross weight: 760 kg (1,676 lb)
- Powerplant: 1 × Renault 4Pb 4-cyl inverted air-cooled in-line piston engine, 72 kW (97 hp)

Performance

- Maximum speed: 185 km/h (115 mph, 100 kn)
- Cruise speed: 160 km/h (99 mph, 86 kn)
- Range: 600 km (370 mi, 320 nmi)
- Service ceiling: 4,500 m (14,800 ft)

== Bibliography ==
- Cortet, Pierre (August 2000). "Rétros du Mois" [Retros of the Month]. Avions: Toute l'Aéronautique et son histoire (in French) (89): 4. ISSN 1243-8650.
- Marian Krzyżan: Międzynarodowe turnieje lotnicze 1929-1934, Warsaw 1988, ISBN 83-206-0637-3 (in Polish)
