= Arado L II =

L II
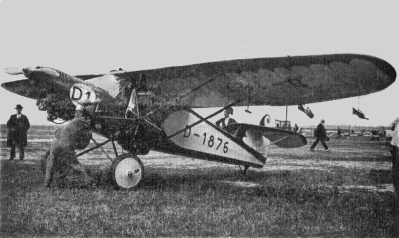
- Arado L IIa at Tempelhof. July 1930

General information
- Type: Touring aircraft
- Manufacturer: Arado
- Designer: Walter Rethel
- Number built: 5

History
- First flight: 1929

The Arado L II was a 1920s German two-seat, high-wing touring monoplane.

In 1930, a revised version with folding wings and improved undercarriage, the L IIa first flew, and four examples took part in the Challenge International de Tourisme 1930, starting from Berlin-Tempelhof airport, but none placed, and one crashed early in the race. Two examples competed in the Deutschlandflug in 1931.

== Specifications (L IIa) ==
Data from German Aviation 1919 – 1945

General characteristics

- Crew: one pilot
- Capacity: one passenger
- Length: 6.72 m (22 ft 0 in)
- Wingspan: 11.00 m (36 ft 1 in)
- Height: 2.30 m (7 ft 7 in)
- Wing area: 17.0 m^{2} (183 sq ft)
- Empty weight: 415 kg (915 lb)
- Gross weight: 700 kg (1,540 lb)
- Powerplant: 1 × Argus As 8R , 60 kW (80 hp)

Performance

- Maximum speed: 160 km/h (100 mph, 87 kn)
- Range: 700 km (440 mi, 380 nmi)
- Service ceiling: 2,000 m (6,560 ft)
- Rate of climb: 2.1 m/s (420 ft/min)
