= IMAM Ro.5 =

Ro.5
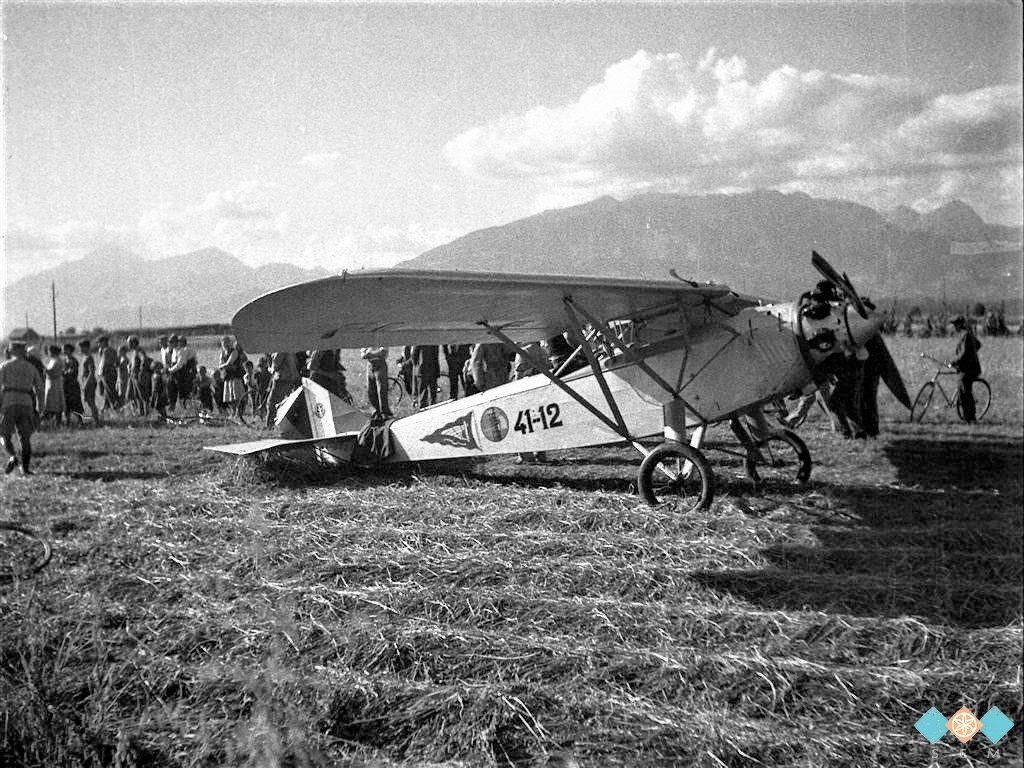

General information
- Type: Sport aircraft
- National origin: Italy
- Manufacturer: IMAM
- Designer: Alessandro Tonini

History
- First flight: 1929

The IMAM Ro.5 was a sport aircraft designed by Alessandro Tonini and produced by IMAM in Italy in the late 1920s.

== Design and development ==
The Ro.5 was a conventional, parasol wing monoplane with fixed tailskid undercarriage and two open cockpits in tandem. It proved popular with private owners and flying clubs, and was built in large numbers. Some Ro.5s were purchased by the Regia Aeronautica for use as trainers and liaison aircraft. A later version, the Ro.5bis, enclosed the cockpits under a long canopy.

== Operators ==
Kingdom of Italy

- Regia Aeronautica

Spain

- Spanish Air Force

== Specifications (Ro.5) ==
Data from Jane's all the World's Aircraft 1928, The Illustrated Encyclopedia of Aircraft

General characteristics

- Crew: 2
- Length: 6.94 m (22 ft 9 in)
- Wingspan: 10 m (32 ft 10 in)
- Height: 2.16 m (7 ft 1 in)
- Wing area: 16 m^{2} (170 sq ft)
- Empty weight: 400 kg (882 lb)
- Gross weight: 680 kg (1,499 lb)
- Powerplant: 1 × Walter NZ 85 7-cyl. air-cooled radial piston engine, 63 kW (85 hp)
- Propellers: 2-bladed fixed pitch propeller

Performance

- Maximum speed: 175 km/h (109 mph, 94 kn) to 180 km/h (110 mph; 97 kn)
- Stall speed: 65 km/h (40 mph, 35 kn)
- Range: 1,000 km (620 mi, 540 nmi)
- Endurance: 6.5 hours
- Service ceiling: 4,000 m (13,000 ft)
- Wing loading: 42.5 kg/m^{2} (8.7 lb/sq ft)
- Power/mass: 0.09341 kW/kg (0.05682 hp/lb)
