= Siemens-Halske Sh 13 =

Type of engine

Sh 13
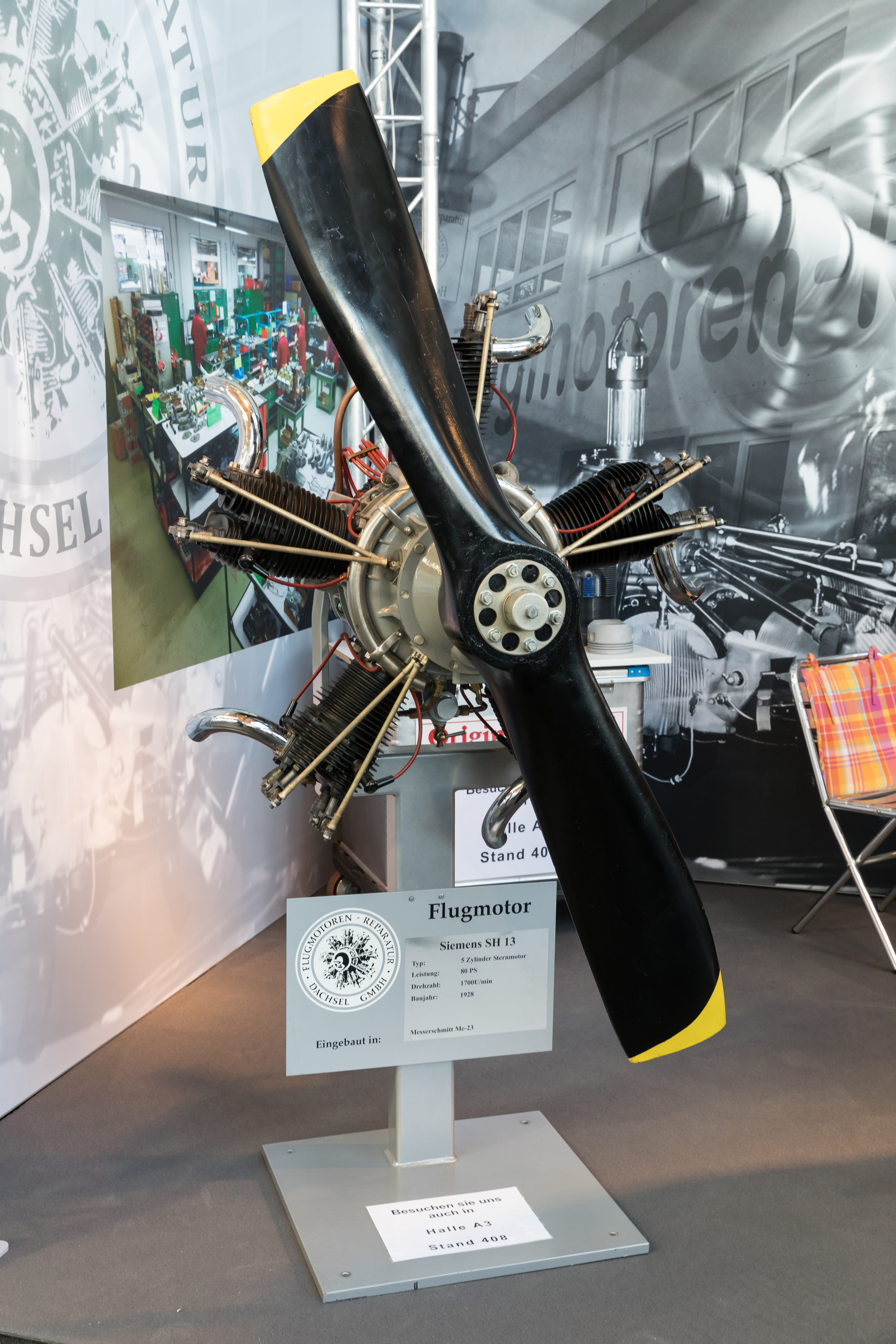
- Type: Radial engine
- Manufacturer: Siemens-Halske
- First run: 1928

The Siemens-Halske Sh 13 was a five-cylinder air-cooled radial engine for aircraft produced in Germany in the 1920s and 1930s. First run in 1928, it was rated at 60 kW (80 hp).

== Applications ==
- Albatros L 82
- Focke-Wulf S 24
- Junkers A 50

== Specifications (Sh 13a) ==
Data from Flight.

=== General characteristics ===
- Type: Five-cylinder radial engine
- Bore: 105 mm (4.13 in)
- Stroke: 120 mm (4.72 in)
- Displacement: 5.2 L (316 cu in)
- Dry weight: 110 kg (242 lb)

=== Components ===
- Valvetrain: OHV
- Cooling system: Air cooled

=== Performance ===
- Power output: 56 kW (75 hp) at 1,850 rpm

== See also ==
Comparable engines

- Armstrong Siddeley Genet
- Warner Scarab Junior

Related lists

- List of aircraft engines
