= Maurice Finat =

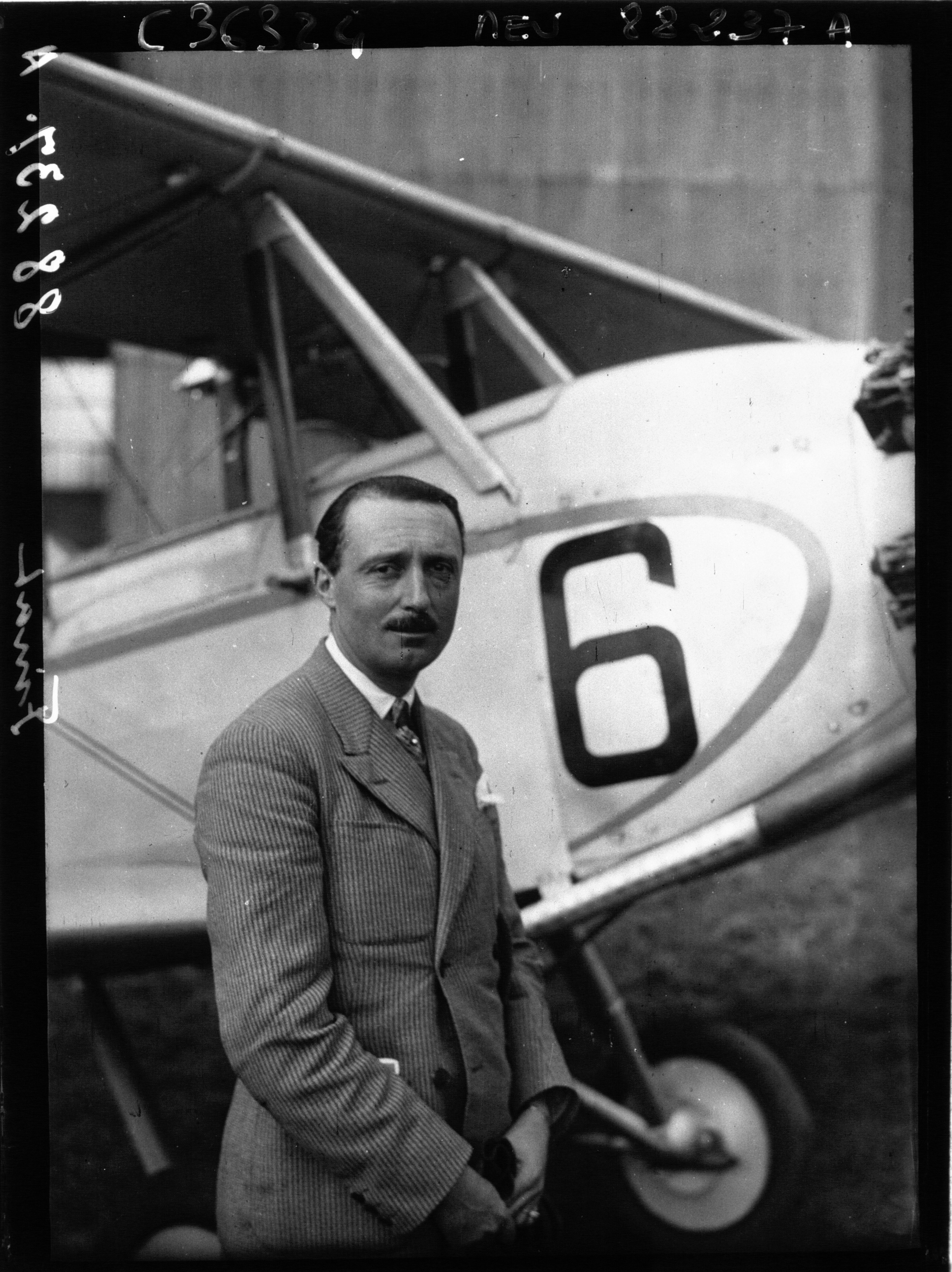
- Finat in 1931
- Born: July 29, 1894; Gironde
- Died: April 20, 1935 (aged 40); Moshi
- Occupation: Aviator
- Known for: Flight Distance Record Holder
- Awards: Legion of Honour Médaille militaire Croix de guerre

Maurice Finat (July 29, 1894 – April 20, 1935) was a French aviator. He served in the French Air Force during the First World War. He specialized in light aircraft. In 1927, he set the record for longest distance flown in a plane, at a length of 539 miles (868 kilometers).

He died near Moshi in 1935 when his plane crashed.

For his service in World War One, he was honored as a Knight of the Legion of Honor.
