= Albatros L 100 =

L 100
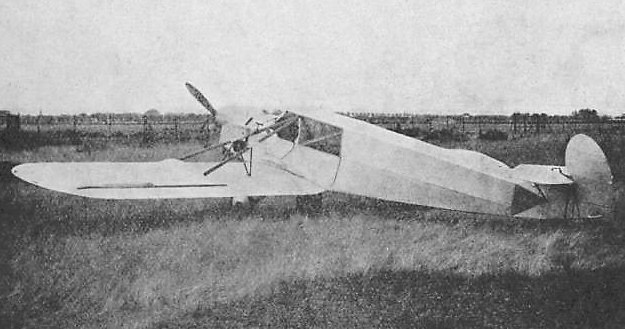

General information
- Type: Sports plane
- Manufacturer: Albatros Flugzeugwerke
- Number built: 1

History
- First flight: 1930

The Albatros L 100 was a light aircraft built in Germany to compete in the Europarundflug air race. It was a low-wing braced monoplane of conventional taildragger configuration.

== Specifications (L 100) ==
General characteristics

- Crew: one pilot
- Capacity: 2 passengers
- Length: 8.45 m (27 ft 9 in)
- Wingspan: 12.15 m (39 ft 10 in)
- Wing area: 20.0 m^{2} (215 sq ft)
- Empty weight: 455 kg (1,000 lb)
- Gross weight: 805 kg (1,775 lb)
- Powerplant: 1 × Argus As 8 , 60 kW (80 hp)

Performance

- Maximum speed: 147 km/h (92 mph, 80 kn)
- Range: 800 km (500 mi, 430 nmi)
- Service ceiling: 3,200 m (10,500 ft)
