= Caudron C.109 =

Light utility aircraft built in France in the late 1920s

C.109
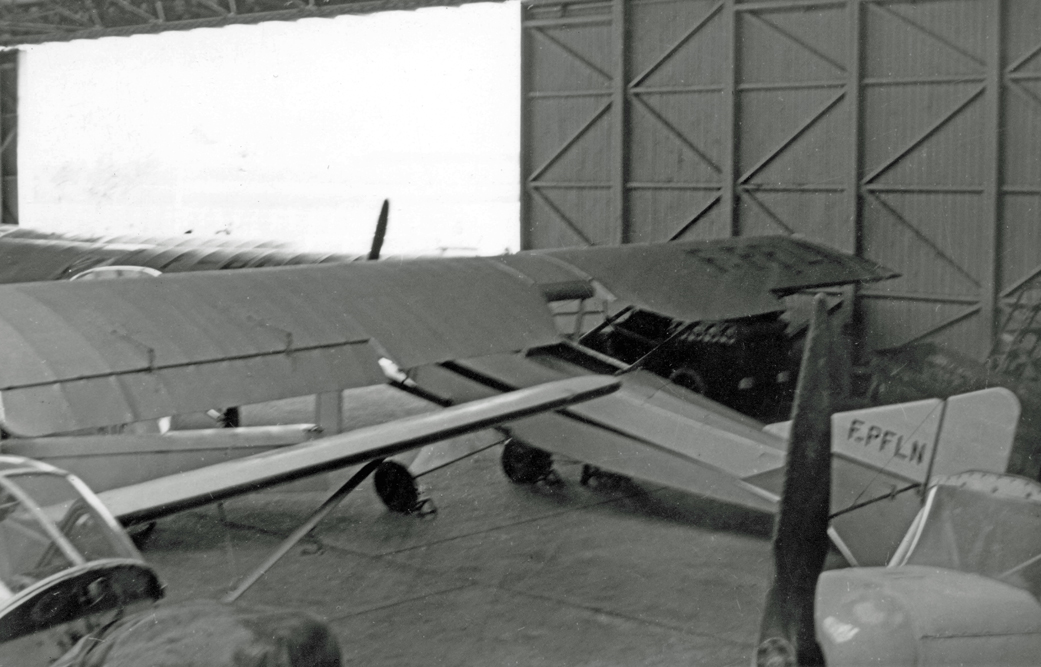
- Caudron C.109 F-PFLN airworthy at Mitry-Mory airfield near Paris in May 1957

General information
- Type: Utility aircraft
- Manufacturer: Caudron
- Number built: 24

History
- First flight: May 1925

The Caudron C.109 was a light utility aircraft built in France in the late 1920s.

== Design and development ==
The C.109 was a parasol-winged braced monoplane of conventional configuration with fixed tailskid undercarriage. The pilot and single passenger sat in tandem open cockpits. C.109s were used in a number of record attempts of the day, and were used to set distance records in the under 350 kg class of 868 km on 19 May 1927 (piloted by Juste Thoret), and 1,581 km on 27 October 1927 (piloted by Max Knipping), a women's duration record of 26 hours 47 minutes on 27 July 1929 (piloted by Maryse Bastié), and the first crossing of Mediterranee by a woman, Léna Bernstein (19 August 1929), 2,268 km.

== Survivors ==
At least one aircraft survived to fly postwar, F-PFLN, F-AIQI prewar, being airworthy at Mitry-Mory airfield near Paris in 1957. This aircraft is held in the collection of the Musée de l'Air et de l'Espace at Le Bourget but is not currently on public display.

== Variants ==
C.109
Two-seat light utility aircraft.
C.109.2
One surviving C.109 was fitted with an 63 kW (85 hp) Salmson 5Aq radial engine.
C.110
Only two aircraft were built. Fitted with a 45 kW (60 hp) Salmson 5AC radial engine.
C.113
A development of the C.110, powered by a 60 hp (45 kW) Anzani 6A-3 engine.
C.114
Fitted with an Anzani 6-cylinder radial engine.
C.117
Fitted with a 45 kW (60 hp) Salmson 5Ac radial engine.

== Operators ==
France

- French Air Force

== Specifications (C.109) ==
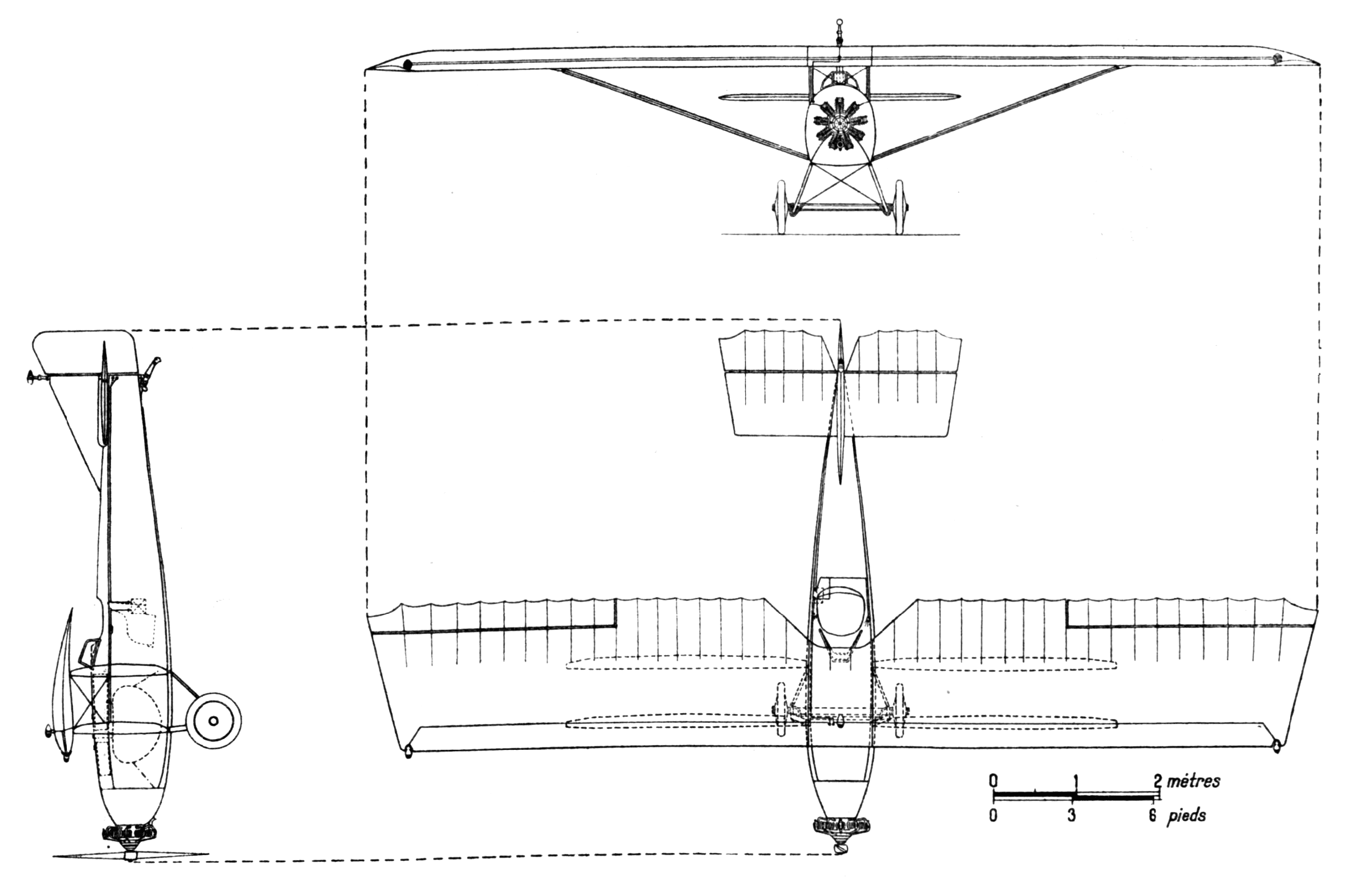
Caudron C.109 3-view drawing from L'Aéronautique October,1927

Data from Les Avions Caudrons, Jane's all the World's Aircraft 1928

General characteristics

- Crew: 2
- Length: 6.44 m (21 ft 2 in)
- Wingspan: 11.50 m (37 ft 9 in)
- Height: 2.53 m (8 ft 4 in)
- Wing area: 19.14 m^{2} (206.0 sq ft)
- Empty weight: 328 kg (723 lb)
- Gross weight: 572 kg (1,261 lb)
- Fuel capacity: 653 kg (1,440 lb) (ca. 460 L (120 US gal; 100 imp gal))
- Powerplant: 1 × Salmson 9AD 9-cylinder engine, 30 kW (40 hp)
- Propellers: 2-bladed fixed pitch propeller

Performance

- Maximum speed: 122.5 km/h (76.1 mph, 66.1 kn) at sea level
- Endurance: 4 hours
- Time to altitude: 500 m (1,600 ft) in 8 minutes
- Power/mass: 0.0649 kW/kg (0.0395 hp/lb)

== Bibliography ==
- Moulin, Jacques & Cony, Christophe (May 2001). "L'aviation était toute sa vie: Léna Bernstein" [Aviation was Her Whole Life: Léna Bernstein]. Avions: Toute l'Aéronautique et son histoire (in French) (98): 59–60. ISSN 1243-8650.
