= Mauboussin Hémiptère =

1930s French experimental light aircraft

M.40 Hémiptère
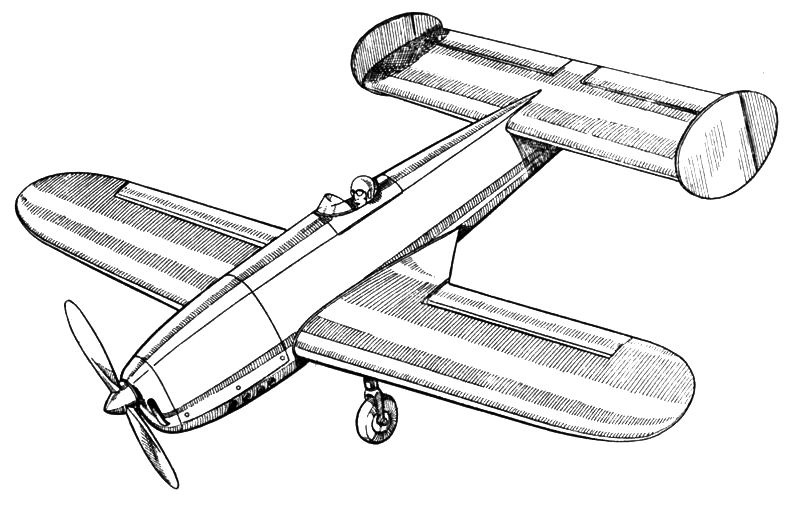

General information
- Type: Experimental light aircraft
- National origin: France
- Manufacturer: Avions Mauboussin
- Number built: 1

History
- First flight: 25 April 1936
- Retired: 1937

The Mauboussin M.40 Hémiptère was an experimental, single seat, single engine light aircraft with unequal span tandem wings, designed in France in the 1930s. Only one was built.

== Design and development ==
Between 1928 and 1932 Pierre Mauboussin worked with Louis Peyret in the Peyret-Mauboussin concern before setting up on his own as Avions Mauboussin. Peyret had earlier designed a tandem wing glider which won first prize at the first British gliding competition in 1922. Despite the overlap of designers and the shared layout, Mauboussin's tandem winged Hémiptère was significantly different from Peyret's aerodynamically as well as being a powered aircraft. The journal Flight presumed that it was a reference to the insect order Hemiptera, whose hindwings are usually shorter than their forewings. This was also a feature of the Hémiptère, in contrast to the identical, swept wings of the Peyret glider.

Apart from its tandem wing, the Hémiptère was a conventional 1930s light aircraft, with a short, flat sided fuselage, a single open cockpit and a fixed tailskid undercarriage. It was powered by a nose-mounted (40 hp (30 kW) 4-cylinder Train engine. The front wing was mounted low on the fuselage and was unswept and of constant chord c = 1.30 m (4 ft 3 in), though with well rounded tips and with a generous trailing edge root fillet. It had about 1.5° of dihedral. The parallel chord rear wing had its leading edge exactly c behind the front wing's trailing edge. Mounted on the upper rear fuselage, it was just c/2 above the front wing. It had about two-thirds the span and 60% of the area of the front wing, with similar dihedral but a different, nearly symmetrical airfoil. It also had a lower angle of attack: viewing this tandem wing aircraft as a biplane with a large negative stagger of c, the decalage was -3°.

Due to its smaller area, lower angle of attack and more symmetrical airfoil, the rear wing generated less lift than the front; the interaction between the two wings also reduced the lift coefficient of the rear one compared with that of the same surface in isolation. Oval end plate fins recovered some of these losses and also carried rudders. Both wings carried pairs of control surfaces which acted together to control pitch. The front wing surfaces could also work together to act as lift generating flaps but did not move differentially as they had on the Peyret glider to provide roll control. The Hémiptère had ailerons only on the rear wing; the higher angle of attack, more asymmetric profile and the interaction between the two wings ensured that the front wing would stall first, leaving sufficient lateral control on the unstalled rear wing to avoid the spin. Wind tunnel tests suggested that the lower lift coefficient of the rear wing would require higher landing speeds than for conventional monoplane but that the tandem wing would have slightly lower drag at incidences up to about 10°.

The Hémiptère flew for the first time on 25 April 1935. It took part in the Rallye des vins de Touraine held on 1–19 July that year. Development was abandoned in 1937 in favour of other, more conventional, Mauboussin light aircraft designs.

== Specifications ==
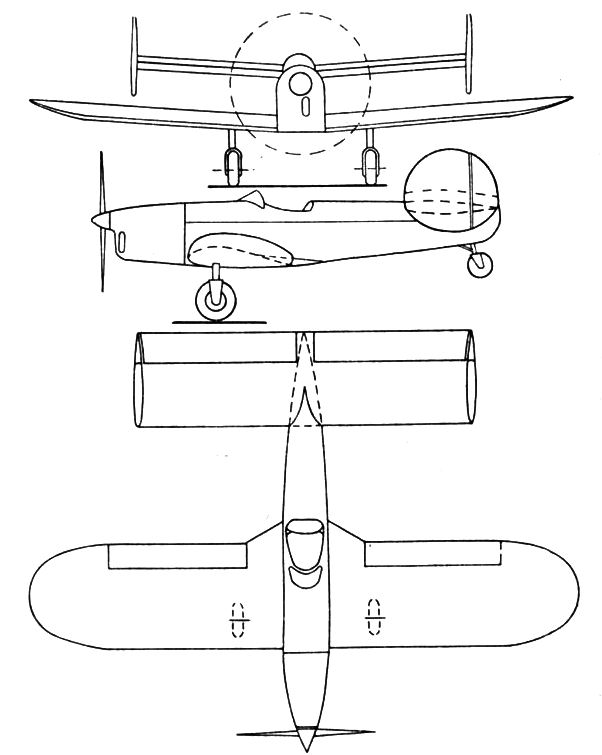
Mauboussin Hémiptère 3-view drawing from L'Aerophile May 1936

Data from AviaFrance

General characteristics

- Capacity: 1
- Length: 5.30 m (17 ft 5 in)
- Wingspan: 7.00 m (23 ft 0 in)
- Height: 2.00 m (6 ft 7 in)
- Wing area: 12.80 m^{2} (137.8 sq ft) including both wings
- Empty weight: 272 kg (600 lb)
- Gross weight: 399 kg (880 lb)
- Powerplant: 1 × Train 4T 4-cylinder inverted air-cooled inline, 30 kW (40 hp)

Performance

- Maximum speed: 160 km/h (99 mph, 86 kn)
- Cruise speed: 140 km/h (87 mph, 76 kn)
- Range: 540 km (340 mi, 290 nmi)
- Service ceiling: 3,800 m (12,500 ft)
