= Ponnier L.1 =

French biplane

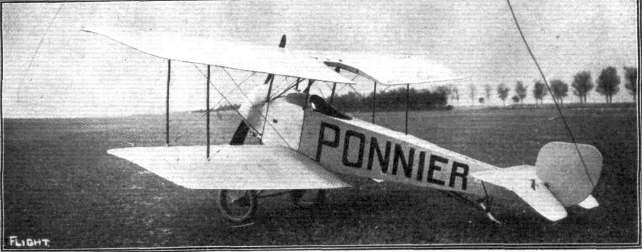

General information
- Type: Single seat scout
- National origin: France
- Manufacturer: Avions Ponnier
- Designer: Alfred Pagny

History
- First flight: c. July 1914

The Ponnier L.1 was an early French biplane single seat scout, built just before World War I. It did not reach production.

== Design ==
Just before World War I, most French aircraft designers had concentrated, with success, on fast monoplanes. When a British biplane, the Sopwith Tabloid, won the Schneider Trophy in 1913 they were encouraged by the French government to think again about the possibilities of that wing configuration for military or "Cavalrie" types. The Ponnier L.1 of July 1913 was one response, a biplane revision of the Cavalrie version of the Ponnier D.III monoplane. The L.1 and D.III shared the same fuselage.

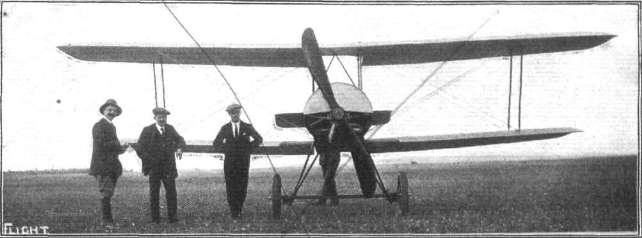

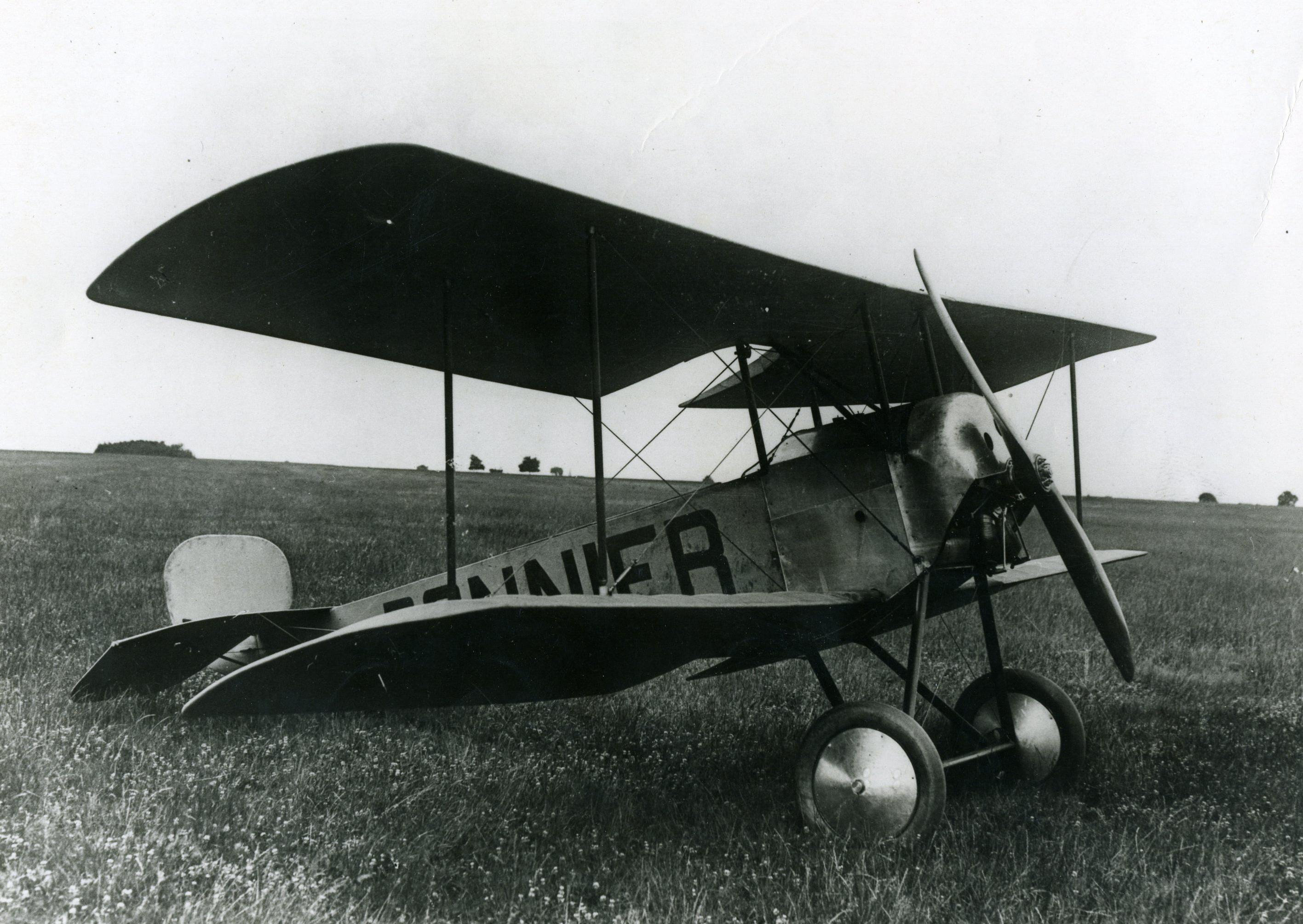

The L.1 was powered by a 50 hp (37 kW) Gnome rotary engine, much less powerful than the 160 hp (119 kW) Gnome in the D.III, but both engines were mounted on tubular steel extensions of the main wooden fuselage. This was rectangular in cross section, with four ash longerons interconnected by spruce struts, internally braced by wires and aluminium covered ahead of the cockpit, extending to a partial, oil deflecting cowling around the upper half of the rotary engine. Behind the single seat open cockpit the fuselage was fabric covered. As on the Ponnier monoplanes there was no fixed fin but just a rounded, flat topped rudder. The tailplane was mounted on top of the fuselage and like the monoplane Cavalrie carried separate elevators; together they formed a horizontal rectangular tail. All the tail surfaces were steel tube structures.

The L.1 was a single bay biplane with a pair of tall, parallel interplane struts with flying and landing wires on each side. There was mild stagger and dihedral. The wings used a thick airfoil and were straight-edged, slightly tapered and square-tipped; the lower wing had a slightly smaller span. The upper wing had a deep cut-out to provide some upward vision for the pilot, who sat under the wing just aft of mid-chord. It had a fixed, conventional undercarriage with its mainwheels on a single axle mounted on a pair of V-struts to the lower fuselage longerons, assisted by a long tailskid, mounted well forward.

Ponnier had hoped for military orders but none came. When the L.1 first appeared its suitability for more powerful engines was noted; rotaries with powers of up to 100 hp (75 kW) were suggested. The Ponnier M.1, flown in 1915 and the only Ponnier fighter to reach production, benefited from the L.1; it was smaller and better streamlined, but shared some features like the thick wings, large gap, moderate stagger and slight span difference between upper and lower planes, the finless vertical tail and simple undercarriage. Its engine was a 80 hp (60 kW) Le Rhone.

== Specifications ==
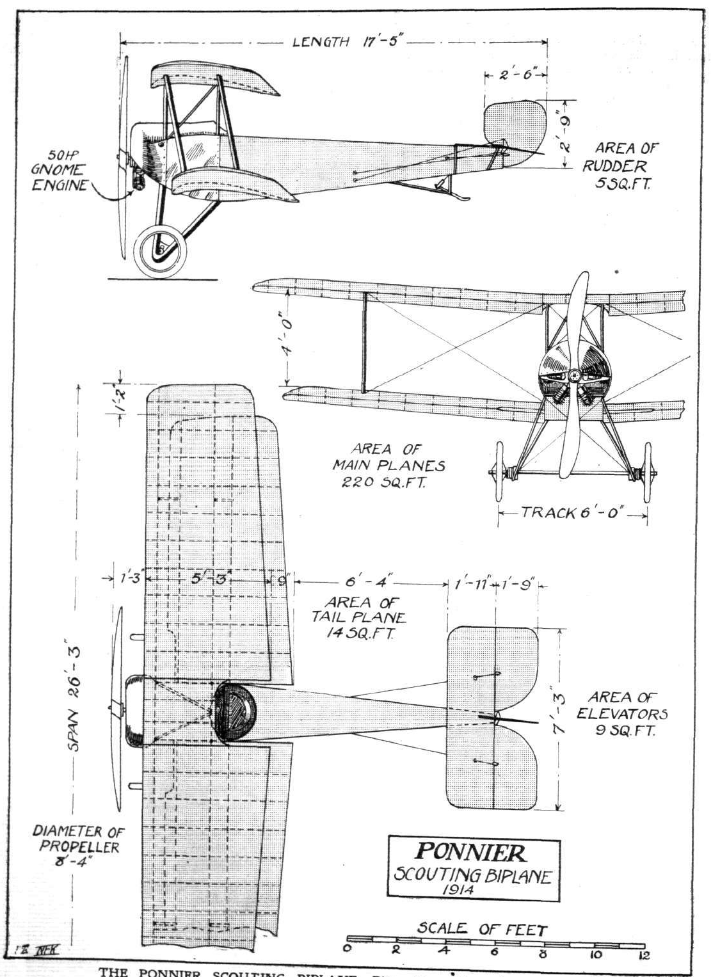

Data from Flight 14 August 1914 p.

General characteristics

- Crew: One
- Length: 5.31 m (17 ft 5 in)
- Wingspan: 8.00 m (26 ft 3 in)
- Wing area: 20 m^{2} (220 sq ft)
- Empty weight: 259 kg (570 lb)
- Powerplant: 1 × Gnome 7-cylinder rotary, 37 kW (50 hp)
- Propellers: 2-bladed, 2.54 m (8 ft 4 in) diameter

Performance

- Maximum speed: 105 km/h (65 mph, 56 kn)
- Stall speed: 53 km/h (33 mph, 29 kn)
- Time to altitude: 8 min to 1,000 m (3,050 ft), with 160 kg (350 lb) load
