= Avions Mauboussin =

- Company type: automobiles design and design and manufacture of aircraft
- Industry: aircraft and space construction
- Predecessor: Peyret-Mauboussin
- Founded: 1935
- Defunct: 1944
- Fate: acquired by Fouga
- Successor: Etablissements Fouga et Compagnie
- Headquarters: France

Avions Mauboussin was a French aircraft manufacturer created in the 1930s.

== Formation ==
Pierre Mauboussin had been in partnership with Louis Peyret from 1928 and had jointly designed three types of light sporting aircraft. Mauboussin left the firm in 1933 after the death of Peyret and established his own aircraft design company. The company was acquired by Fouga in 1936, but continued to produce further designs until 1948.

== Aircraft designs ==
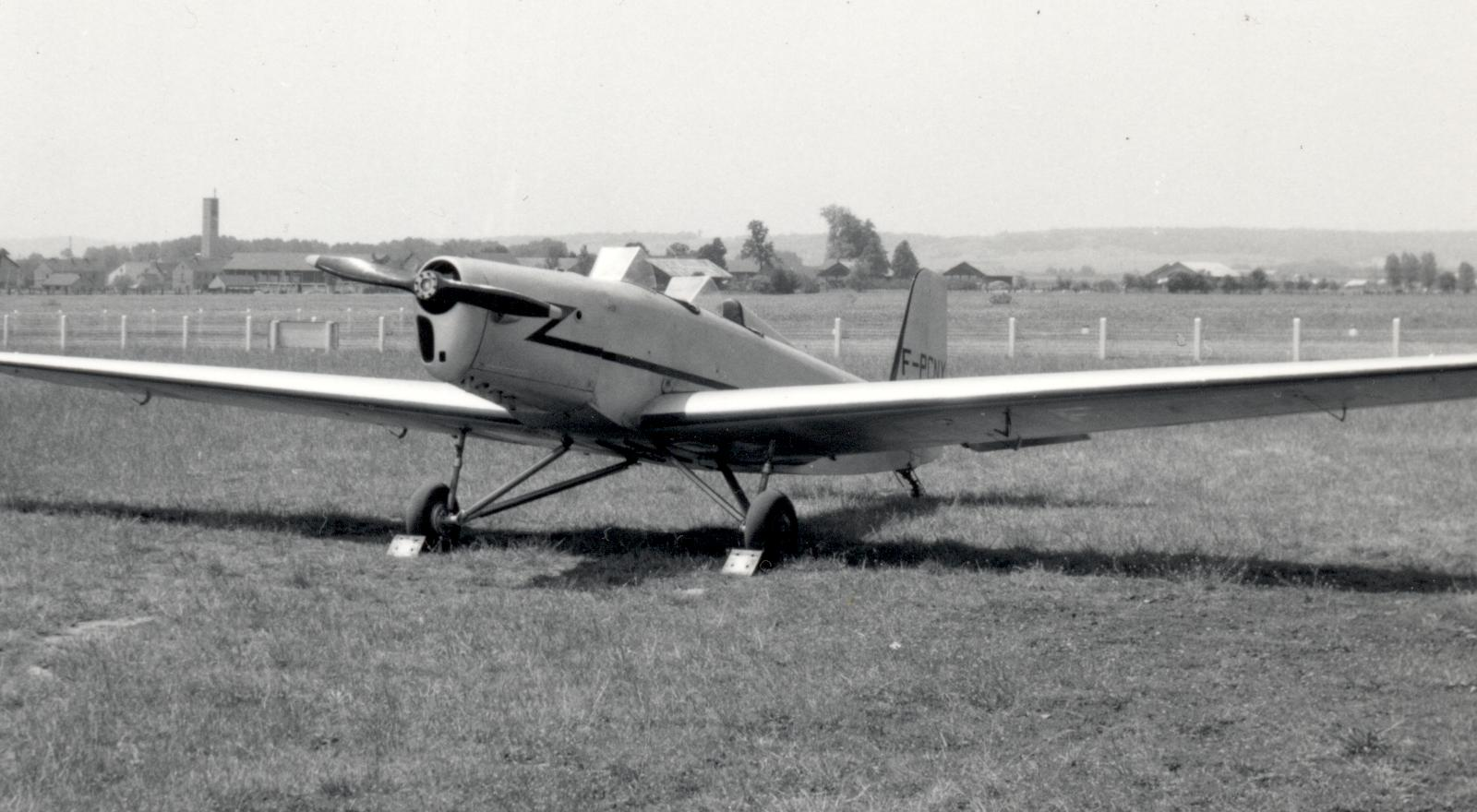
A Mauboussin M.123 at Persan-Beaumont airfield, Paris, in June 1957

Mauboussin M.112 Corsaire (6 built, first original Peyret PM XII)
Mauboussin M.120 Corsaire series
(over 100 built pre and postwar)
Mauboussin M.40 Hemiptere
(1 single-seat double monoplane built in 1936)
Mauboussin M.200 series
(2 low-wing aircraft built 1939-1941)
Mauboussin M.300
(1 or 2 twin-engined low wing trainers built in 1948)

== Surviving aircraft ==
Nine M.120 Corsaire series aircraft survived in French aircraft collections and museums during 2005. A few examples are still airworthy.
