= Ponnier M.1 =

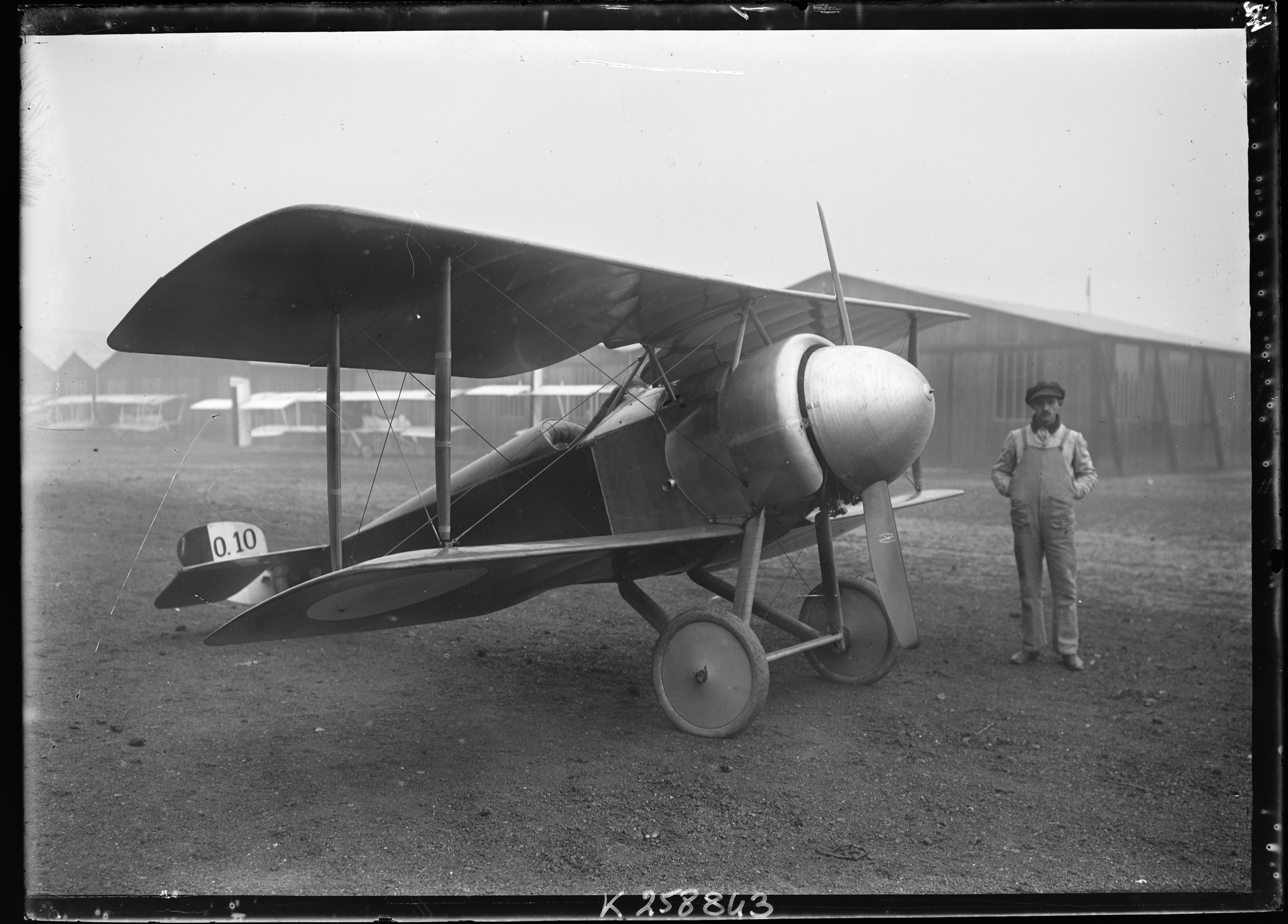

General information
- Type: Single seat fighter
- National origin: France
- Manufacturer: Avions Ponnier
- Designer: Emile Eugène Dupont
- Number built: c.20

History
- Introduction date: 1916
- First flight: 1915
- Retired: November 1916

The Ponnier M.1 was an early French World War I fighter aircraft. Most of those produced were operated by the Aviation Militaire Belge. They were deemed unusable by the Belgian ace Willy Coppens and rapidly retired.

== Design and development ==
Avions Ponnier had attempted to win a pre-World War I contract from the French military with their 1913 Ponnier L.1 scout, designed by Alfred Pagny, but were not successful. After the start of the war, they returned with a new design, clearly informed by their experience with the L.1. This aircraft, the M.1, was supposedly designed by Emile Dupont despite its similarities with the L.1; Dupont was later employed by the reformed Hanriot concern to design the 1916 Hanriot HD.1 fighter.

The Ponnier M.1 was a single bay biplane with a pair of parallel interplane struts on each side, braced with pairs of flying and landing wires. There was mild stagger but no sweep or dihedral. In plan the wings were almost rectangular; the lower plane was smaller both in span and chord. Low aspect ratio ailerons were mounted on the upper planes only.

The M.1 was powered by an 80 hp (60 kW) le Rhône 9C nine cylinder rotary engine, fitted with a two blade propeller and an unusually large domed spinner, nearly identical in appearance to the casserôle found on the Morane-Saulnier Type N, which left only a small gap for cooling air between it and the almost complete cylindrical engine enclosure. Behind the engine the fuselage was flat sided, with a curved upper decking. The open single cockpit was at the wing trailing edge, and there were cut-outs in both planes to improve the pilot's view. The fuselage tapered aft where the horizontal tail was mounted on top of the fuselage; the original tail surfaces were very small and without a fixed fin. Later versions had an enlarged straight edged tailplane and split pair of angle tipped elevators, a wide chord fin and enlarged rudder. The M.1 had a fixed conventional undercarriage, with mainwheels on a single axle mounted on a pair of V-struts from the lower fuselage longerons and wire cross braced. The only armament was a single Lewis gun, mounted well above the upper wing surface.

The M.1 made its first flight in 1915.

== Operational history ==
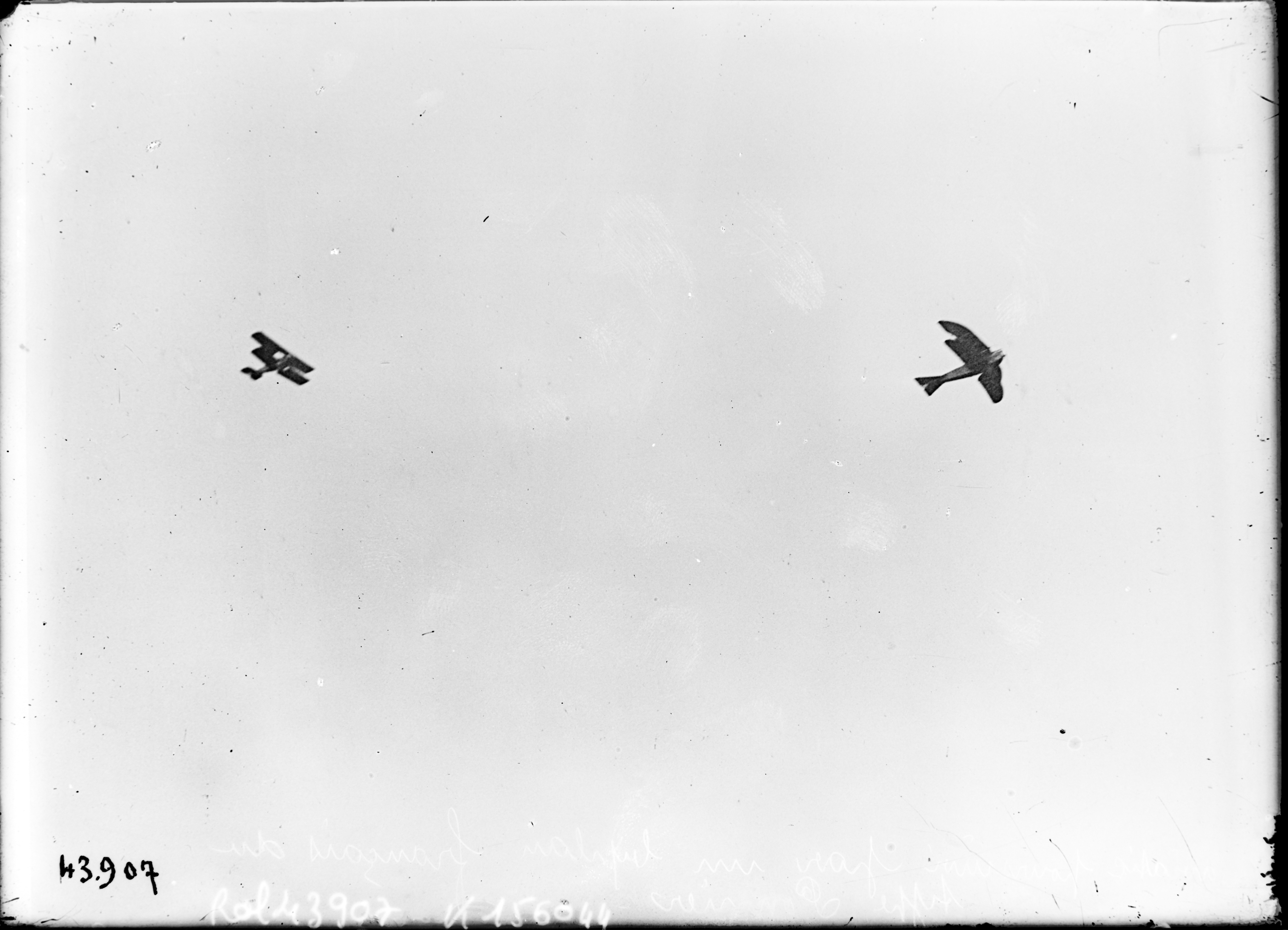
A Ponnier M.I pursuing an Aviatik C.I

Despite the loss of an early example in January 1916, at least twenty M.1s were produced by S.A. Française de Constructions Aéronautiques, Ponnier's successor company to Avions Ponnier. Most of these, probably more than eighteen, were bought by the Aviation Militaire Belge which according to their ace Willy Coppens found them ineffective despite modifications which included the larger empennage and spinner removal. Like the few examples which remained in France, where no unit was equipped with them, they were rapidly discarded.

== Variants ==
Details from Green and Swanborough p. 479

M.1
The single-seat fighter.
M.2
A slightly larger two-seat version offered to the RFC, probably not built.

== Operators ==
Belgium

- Belgian Air Force

== Specifications ==
Data from Green and Swanborough p.479

General characteristics

- Crew: One
- Length: 5.75 m (18 ft 10 in)
- Wingspan: 6.18 m (20 ft 3 in)
- Height: 2.30 m (7 ft 7 in)
- Empty weight: 304 kg (670 lb)
- Gross weight: 464 kg (1,023 lb)
- Powerplant: 1 × Le Rhône 9C 9-cylinder rotary, 60 kW (80 hp)
- Propellers: 2-bladed

Performance

- Maximum speed: 167 km/h (104 mph, 90 kn) at sea level
- Time to altitude: 4.67 min to 1,000 m (3,280 ft)

Armament

- Guns: 1×7.7 mm (0.303 in) Lewis machine gun above upper wing
