= Peyret-Mauboussin =

Defunct French aircraft manufacturer

- Company type: Aircraft design and construction
- Industry: Aircraft
- Founded: 1928
- Defunct: 1932
- Fate: Ceased activities
- Successor: Avions Mauboussin
- Headquarters: France

Peyret-Mauboussin was a French aircraft manufacturer of the late 1920s and early 1930s.

== History ==
The firm was formed by Louis Peyret and Pierre Mauboussin in 1928 with the aim of designing and constructing a series of light sporting civil aircraft. Three types of single-engined aircraft were produced before Mauboussin left the firm in 1932 in order to form his own company.

== Aircraft types produced ==
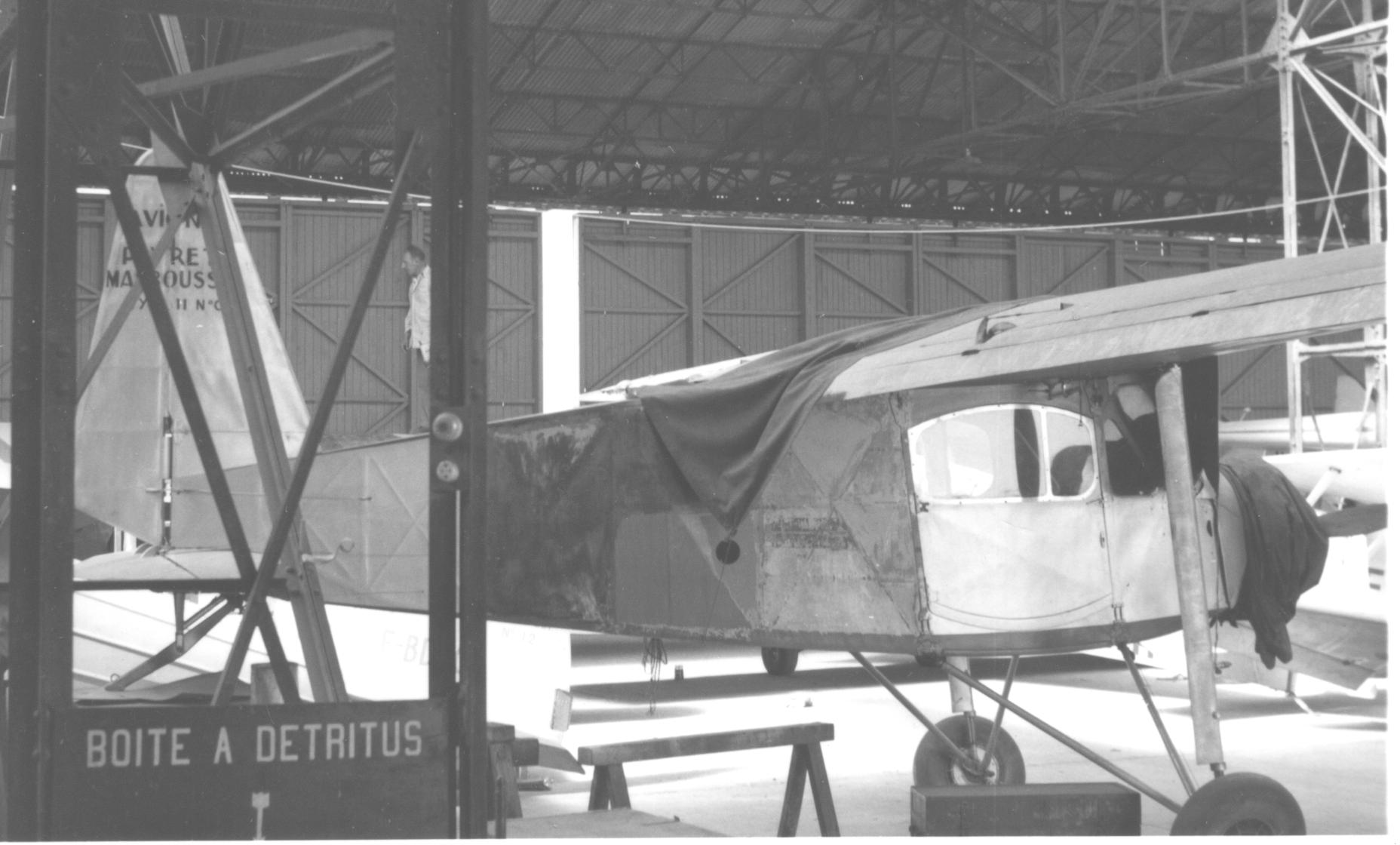
The P-M XI No.02 stored in 1957. This aircraft flew from Paris to Tananarive, Madagascar, in December 1931

Peyret-Mauboussin PM X
single-seat high-wing monoplane (1 built in 1928)
Peyret-Mauboussin PM XI
two-seat high-wing monoplane (2 built in 1931)
Peyret-Mauboussin PM XII
two-seat low-wing monoplane (1 built in 1931) (The Mauboussin M.120 was developed from this design).

== Preserved aircraft ==
The second Peyret-Mauboussin PM XI F-AJUL is preserved in the Musee Castel-Mauboussin at Cuers-Pierrefeu airfield near Toulon and can be viewed by prior arrangement. This light aircraft had been flown by Rene Lefevre from Paris to Tananarive, Madagascar in December 1931, taking 14 days for the journey.
