= Peyret-Mauboussin PM XI =

1930s French light aircraft

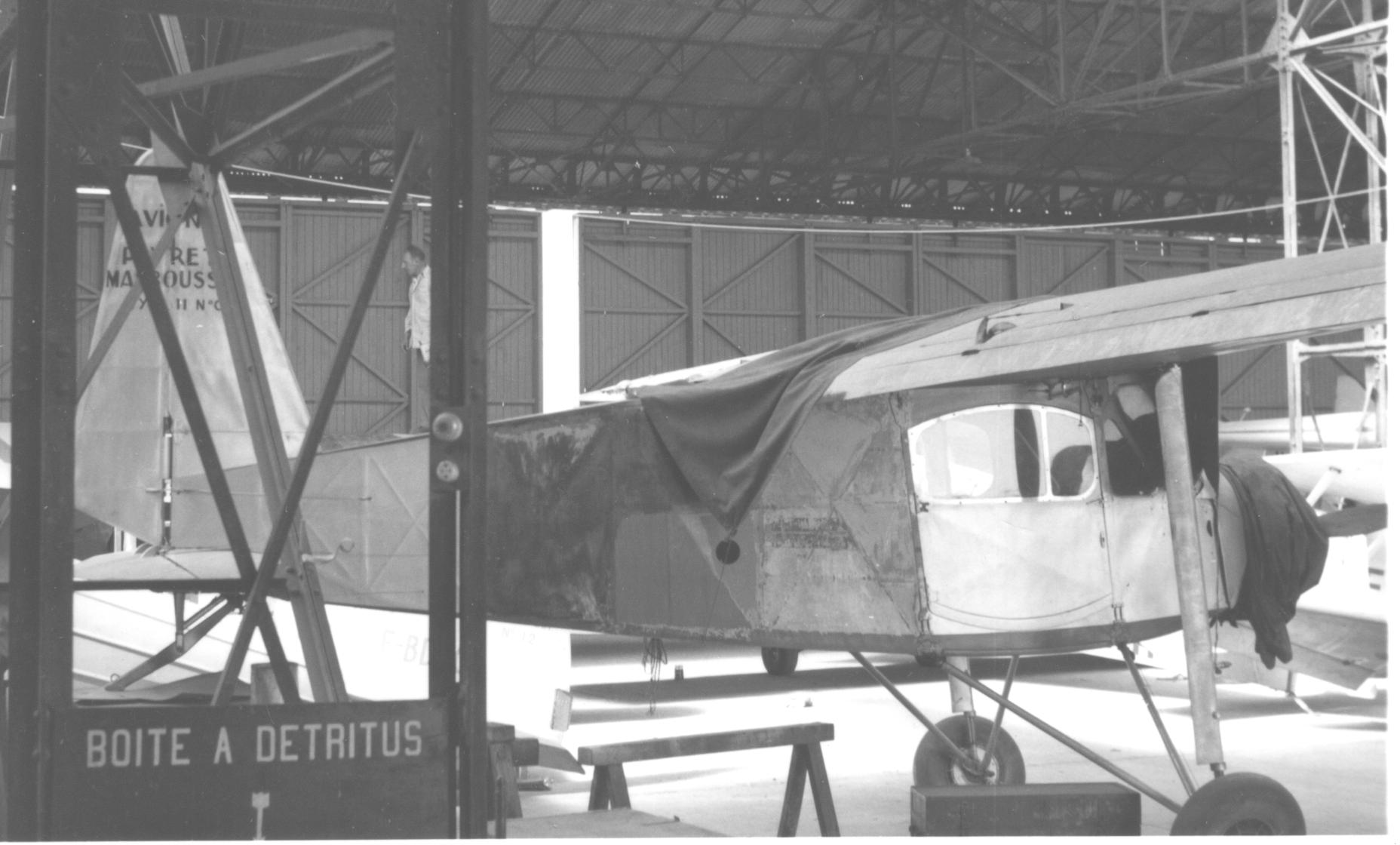
- Peyret-Mauboussin PM XI No.02 at Mitry-Mory airfield near Paris in May 1957. This aircraft flew Paris-Tananarive in December 1931

General information
- Type: two-seat touring aircraft
- National origin: France
- Manufacturer: Peyret-Mauboussin
- Designer: Louis Peyret and Pierre Mauboussin
- Status: one preserved by a museum
- Primary user: private flyers
- Number built: 2

History
- First flight: 9 July 1930
- Developed from: Peyret-Mauboussin PM X

The Peyret-Mauboussin PM XI was a high-wing touring aircraft that was designed and produced by the French aircraft manufacturer Peyret-Mauboussin.

The PM XI was designed as a Salmson-engined two-seat touring and sporting aircraft of wooden construction. It was, in part, an enlarged and more powerful derivative of the single-seat Peyret-Mauboussin PM X. A total of two aircraft were built, the first of which conducted its maiden flight on 9 July 1930. These aircraft were subjected to various trials and tests as well as being entered into competitive races. Quantity production was never established.

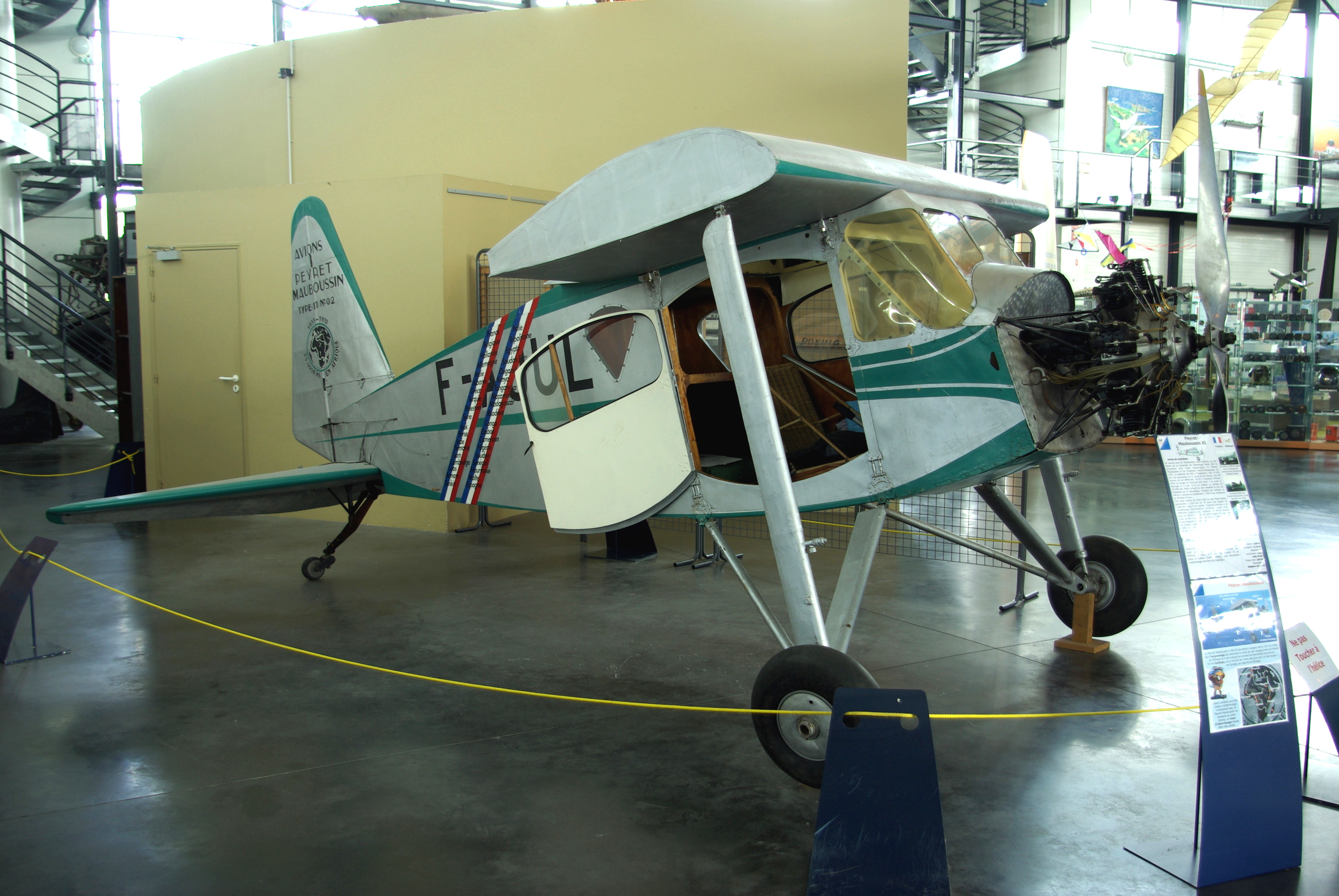
Peyret Mauboussin Type 11 n°02 preserved in the aircraft museum of Angers-Marcé (France).

== Design and development ==
The origins of the PM XI can be directly traced to the preceding Peyret-Mauboussin PM X, a record-breaking single-seat aircraft. The PM X had been designed by Pierre Mauboussin and his close collaborator Louis Peyret; it set no less than four world records and demonstrated impressive performance as both a land-based and float-equipped seaplane. Accordingly, the design team opted to work on a successor aircraft, one that they decided would not only be an improvement over the PM X but also enlarged considerably.

The PM XI was furnished with a single-piece cantilever monoplane wing that rested on the fuselage. It was tapered, had an aspect ratio of 9.5, and equipped with elliptical tips. The wing profile varied in thickness, being relatively fine at small angles of attack and without displacement of the critical point. This wing was equipped with Louis Peyret style double-hinged ailerons (which insured greater efficacy across all angles of flight) that covered almost the entirety of the trailing edge. These ailerons could be actuated simultaneously in the same direction by means of a lever, thus enabling it to increase the already substantial lift of the wing as well as to adjust its fineness.

The wing was attached to the airframe at a total of four points using fittings that were arranged in the form of a square. Following the removal of these bolts, the wing could be turned 90 degrees to bring it parallel to the fuselage. In order to permit this movement, the vertical empennage, which was mounted on hinges, could be turned downwards to the horizontal position. It was then supported by a pair of struts that, during flight, remained against the walls of the fuselage. Moreover, the shock-absorbing struts of the landing gear, which would typically be attached to the forward wing spar, were attached to the top of the fuselage instead. The structure of the wing is composed of wood. The primary structural elements consisted of a pair of box spars of equal strength along with strips that ran parallel to the spars and simple box ribs. The entirety of the wing’s surface was covered with plywood of variable thickness; a special varnish was applied as a protective measure.

The PM XI had a relatively compact rectangular-section fuselage that terminated in a vertical rudder post. The framework, which was entirely composed of wood, comprised four longerons that were held in position using transverse frames. Wood was also used for the empennages, each of which consisted of a fixed section and an unbalanced movable section. These cantilever sections, which were particularly efficacious as a consequence of their ample area, were quite thick.

The PM XI was outfitted with an enclosed cockpit which occupied the portion of the fuselage that was situated directly underneath the wing. It was entered via a sizable door on the right-hand side and contained a pair of seats in a side-by-side arrangement. Dual flight controls were typically fitted; the pilot was normally seated on the left. Aft of the seats was a compact baggage compartment. Excellent external visibility was provided via the numerous windows present in the walls as well as transparent panes fitted into the ceiling of the cockpit. The wind shield was composed of triplex glass.

The PM XI was powered by a single Salmson 9 Ad nine-cylinder direct-drive radial engine, which was capable of producing up to 40 hp while at 2,000 r.p.m. It drove either a Levasseur-supplied metal propeller or a metal-tipped wooden propeller. The engine was mounted on an autogenously welded steel-tubing frame that was readily removable as a result of it being attached to the forward end of the fuselage via a total of four bolts. It was separated from the cockpit by a firewall. The engine was covered by a NACA type cowling that was designed by Pierre Mauboussin; this cowling not only reduced drag but also functioned as a muffler and warmed the intake gases. Ignition of the engine was achieved from within the cockpit, either using a crank or an automatic starter. Fuel was housed within a pair of fuel tanks located inside the wing; if required, larger tanks could be fitted in place of the standard ones, which held up to 60 litres.

It was furnished with a two-part landing gear that consisted of a pair of struts which were hinged to the bottom of the fuselage and formed a V-shape, the apex of which met the base of the vertical shock-absorbing strut. This strut incorporated either a Messier-supplied oleopneumatic shock absorber or with a Mauboussin shock absorber comprising rubber washers. The wheels were furnished with independent brakes that were controlled using pedals fitted to the rudder bar as well as via a lever. The aircraft could be fitted with a dirigible tail skid, which was braked using sandows and incorporated a spring-steel shock absorber. However, when the wheels were provided with brakes, this skid was replaced by a small wheel that was mounted elastically underneath the rudder post. Furthermore, the landing gear could be easily replaced by a pair of wooden floats, which used the same fittings, to convert the PM XI into a seaplane.

== Operational history ==
A pair of PM.XIs were built in parallel. The airframe c/n 02 was finished first and performed its maiden flight on 9 July 1930. It was registered as F-AJUL. c/n 01 F-AKFD was ordered by the French Service Technique.

In July 1930, F-AJUL took part in the Challenge International de Tourisme 1930 touring aircraft contest, piloted by Charles Fauvel, but sustained damage to its landing gear during a compulsory landing. By November of that year, one was flying at their Orly base while the other was under test for its CoA at Villacoublay. F-AJUL was later flown by Rene Lefevre from Paris to Tananarive, Madagascar, between 1 and 14 December 1931. The total distance flown was 11,000 km at an average speed of 120 km/hour. He also flew it, after fitting extra tankage in the cabin, from Paris to Saigon in 10 days during December 1932, a distance of 10,500 km (6,500 mi). The return trip in February 1933 took 8 days.

This aircraft is stored without wings at the Musee Castel-Mauboussin at Cuers-Pierrefeu airfield near Toulon in southern France, and can be viewed by prior permission.

== Specifications ==
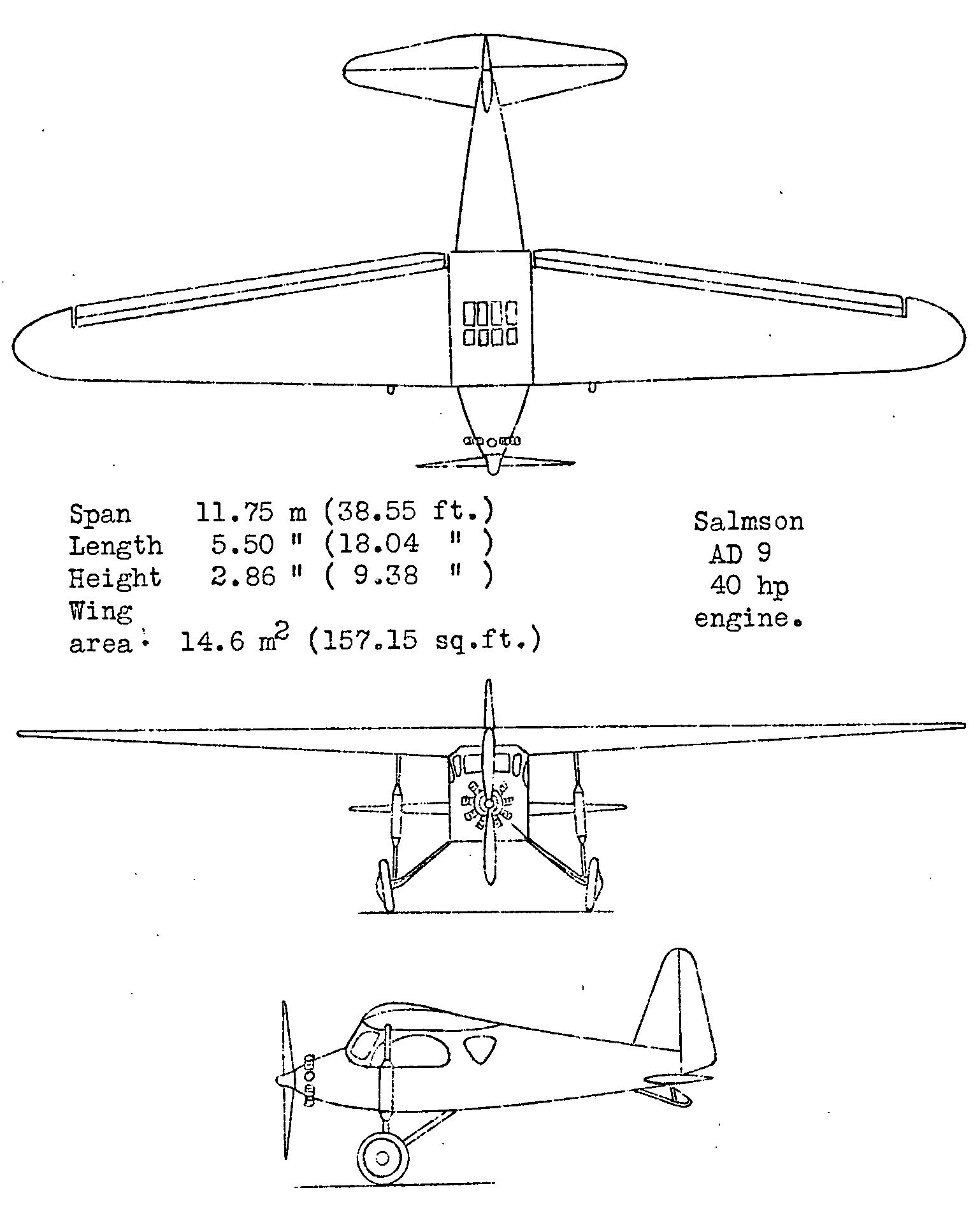
Mauboussin M-11 3-view drawing from NACA Aircraft Circular No.145

Data from National Advisory Committee for Aeronautics

General characteristics

- Crew: Two
- Length: 5.50 m (18 ft 1 in)
- Wingspan: 11.75 m (38 ft 7 in)
- Height: 2.86 m (9 ft 5 in)
- Wing area: 14.6 m^{2} (157 sq ft)
- Empty weight: 320 kg (705 lb)
- Gross weight: 515 kg (1,135 lb)
- Powerplant: 1 × Salmson 9 Ad nine-cylinder radial engine, 30 kW (40 hp)
- Maximum speed: 155 km/h (96 mph, 84 kn) at ground level
- Cruise speed: 135 km/h (84 mph, 73 kn)
- Range: 500 km (310 mi, 270 nmi)
- Service ceiling: 4,500 m (14,800 ft)
- Landing speed: 65 km/h (40 mph)
