= Keel effect =

In aeronautics, the keel effect (also known as the pendulum effect or pendulum stability) is the result of the sideforce-generating surfaces being above or below the center of gravity of the aircraft. Along with dihedral, sweepback, and weight distribution, keel effect is one of the four main design considerations in aircraft lateral stability.

== Mechanism ==
Examples of sideforce-generating surfaces are the vertical stabilizer, rudder, and parts of the fuselage. When an aircraft is in a sideslip, these surfaces generate sidewards lift forces. If the surface is above or below the center of gravity, the sidewards forces generate a rolling moment. This rolling moment caused by sideslip is dihedral effect. Keel effect is the contribution of these side forces to rolling moment as sideslip increases. Sideforce-producing surfaces above the center of gravity will increase dihedral effect, while sideforce-producing surfaces below the center of gravity will decrease dihedral effect.

Increased dihedral effect (helped or hindered by keel effect) results in a greater tendency for the aircraft to return to level flight after the aircraft is put into a bank. It reduces the tendency to diverge to a greater bank angle when the aircraft starts wings-level.

Keel effect is also called pendulum effect because a lower center of gravity increases the effect of sideways forces (above the center of gravity) in producing a rolling moment. This is because the moment arm is longer, not because of gravitational forces. A low center of gravity is like a pendulum.

The effect is an important consideration in seaplane design where pontoon floats generate strong sideforces with a long moment arm.
