= Mauboussin M.120 =

M.120 Corsaire
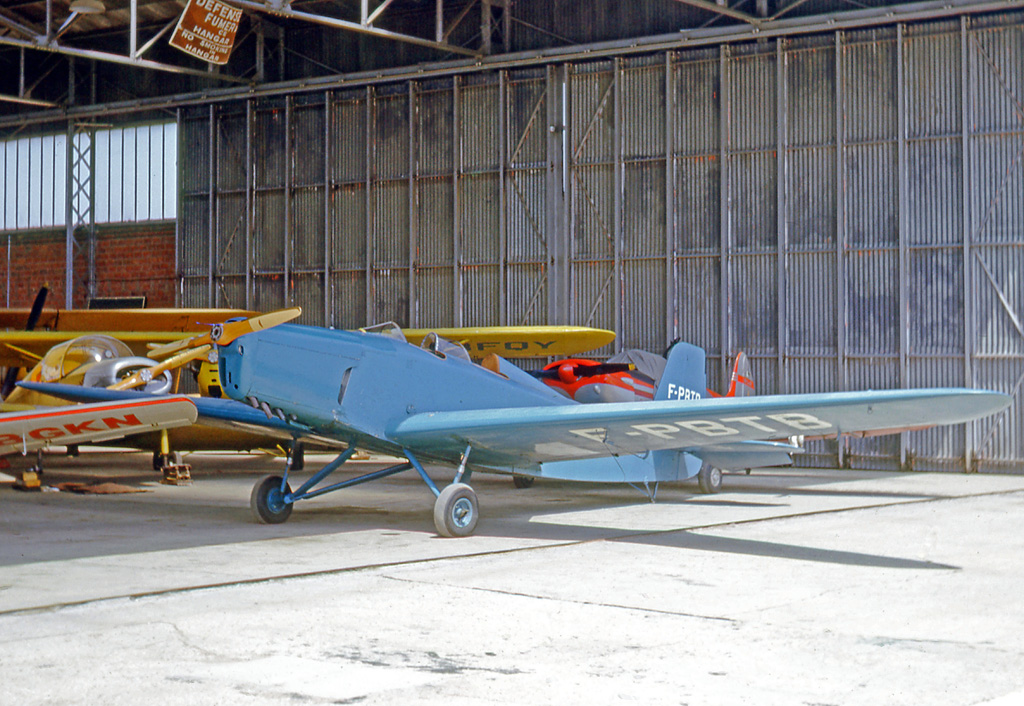
- A Mauboussin M.127 at Guyancourt airfield near Paris in 1965

General information
- Type: Trainer
- Manufacturer: Fouga
- Designer: Pierre Mauboussin
- Primary user: aero clubs and private flyers
- Number built: 116

History
- First flight: 1932

The Mauboussin M.120 was a trainer and touring aircraft built in France in the 1930s and again in the years following World War II.

== Design and production ==
It was based on a 1931 Peyret-Mauboussin collaboration between Louis Peyret and Pierre Mauboussin, the Peyret-Mauboussin PM.XII, and like it, was a low-wing cantilever monoplane of wooden construction. The undercarriage was of fixed tailskid type, and the pilot and instructor sat in tandem, open cockpits. Mauboussin built a number of prototypes himself, followed by a small series manufactured for him by Breguet in 1934.

At one stage Mauboussins were produced by the Société Zodiac.

In 1936, Fouga, then a builder of railway rolling stock, purchased all rights to the design as part of an effort to enter the aircraft industry and was able to secure a contract from the Armée de l'Air to supply the type as the M.123.

Production was restarted by Fouga after the war for the French flying clubs.

== Operations ==
One of first M.120s took part in the international touring aircraft contest Challenge 1932, flown by André Nicolle. It completed contest on the last 24th place, but it had the weakest engine of all participants and completing this contest was quite a success anyway. Two competed the following year, one of them with an all-women crew for probably the first time. Again, low engine power left them low in the final table.

After the Angers competition on 2 August 1933, one of the women (Hélène Boucher) set a new women's world altitude record at 5,900 m (19,357 ft) in the M.120. In 1935 Maryse Hilsz increased it to 7,388 m (24,239 ft) on 24 September in the M.122.

== Variants ==
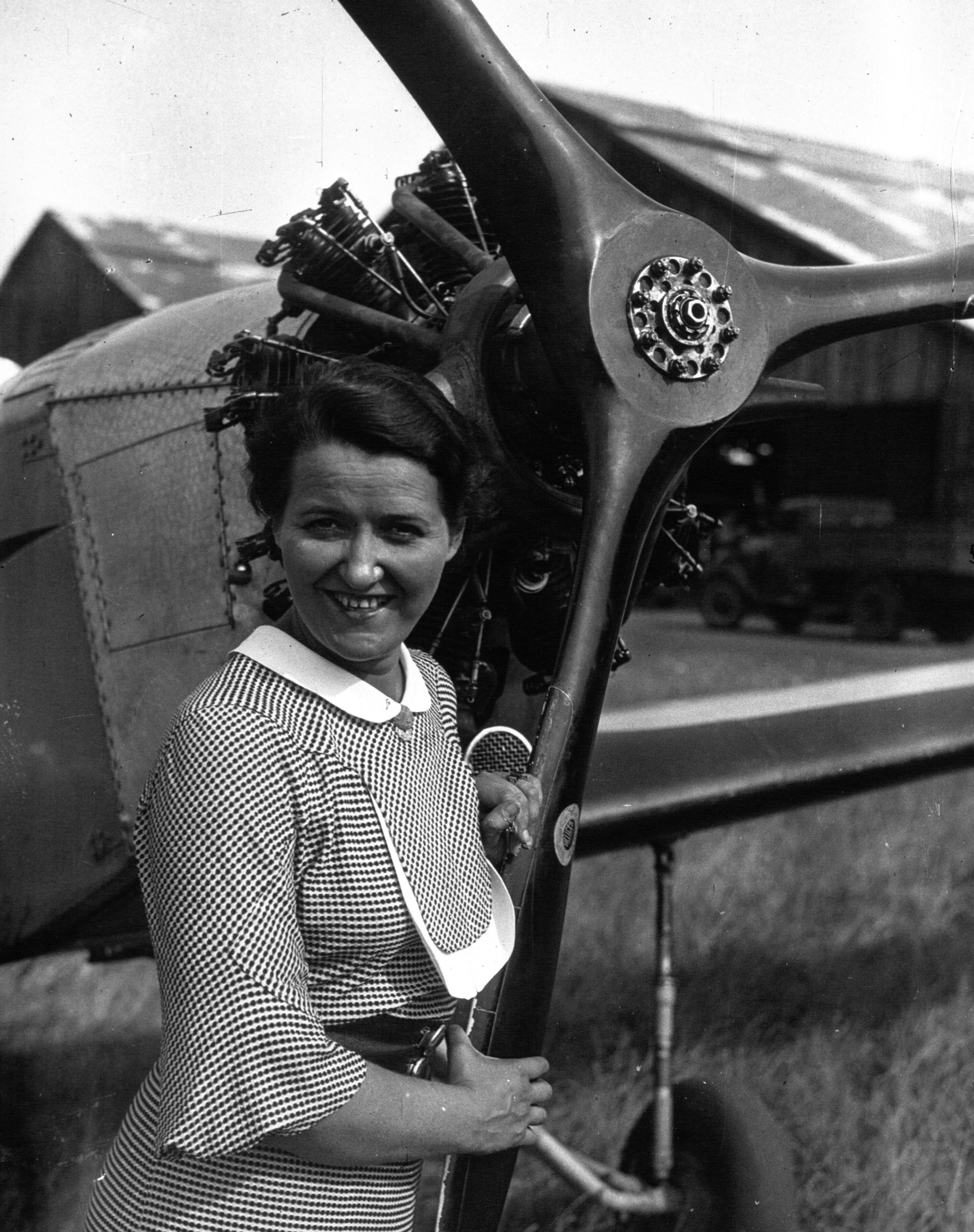
Maryse Hilsz holding the propeller of her Mauboussin M.122, 1935

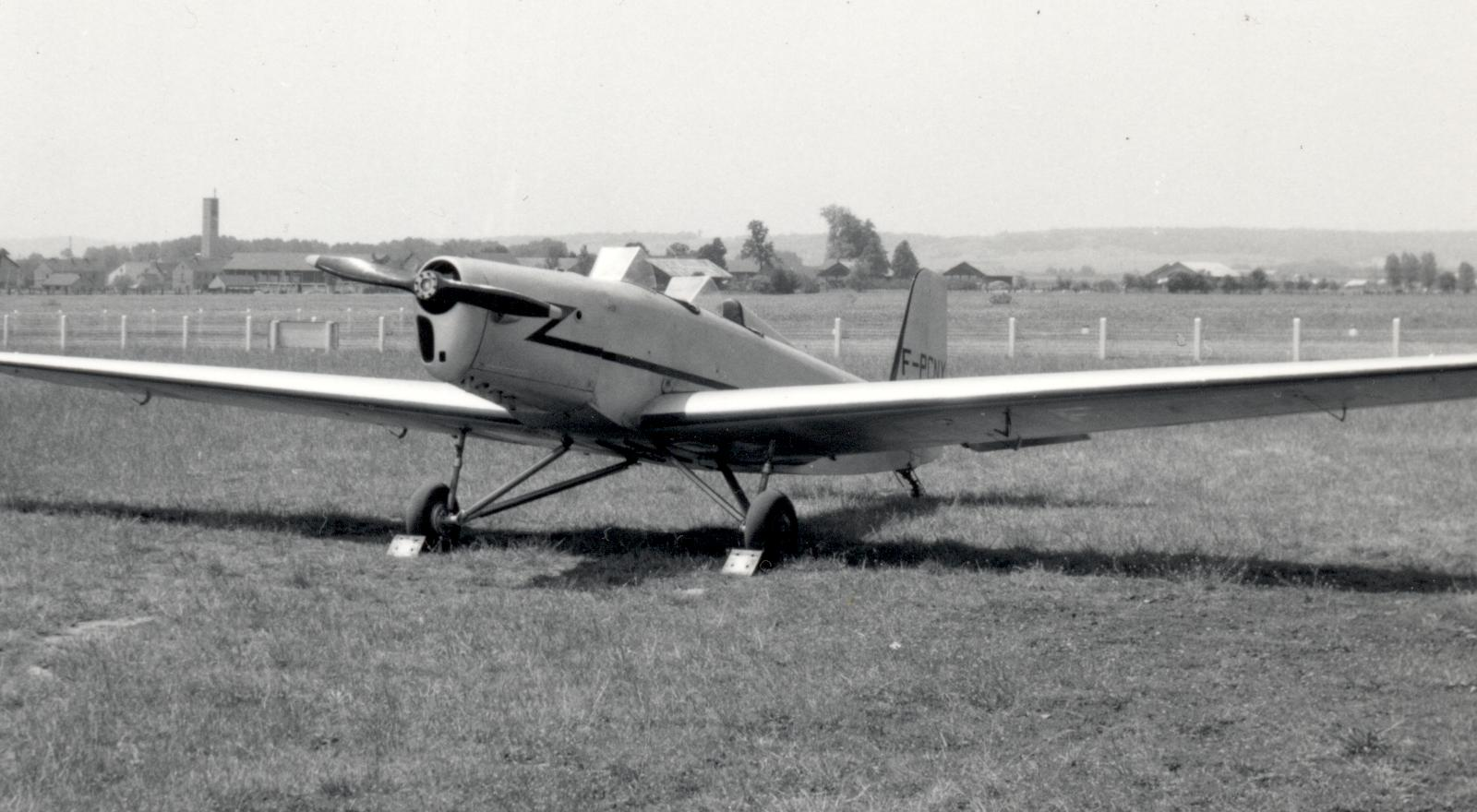
Mauboussin M.123 derivative known as the Metalair 1 at Persan airfield in northern France in 1957

M.120
original design with 60 hp (45 kW) Salmson 9Adr engine
M.120/32
examples built by Mauboussin (3 built)
M.120/34
examples built by Breguet (10 built)
M.120/37
M.121
as M.120 but with supercharged Salmson 9A 68–80 hp (51–60 kW)
M.121P Corsaire Major
version with Pobjoy Cataract engine (4 built)
M.122 Corsaire Major
version with Salmson 9Aers engine for Maryse Hilsz (1 built)
M.123
major production version with Salmson 9Adr engine (65 built)
M.123C
Continental A65 engine
M.123M
70 hp (52 kW) Minié engine.
M.123R
60 hp (45 kW) Régnier engine.
M.123T
60 hp (45 kW) Train engine.
Metalair 1
a derivative of the M.123
Grenet PG-2 Bison
M.124
first postwar version with Aster 4A engine (1 built)
M.125
version with Régnier 4Jo engine (5 built)
M.126
version with Salmson 5Ap engine (1 built)
M.127
version with Régnier 4Eo engine (2 built)
M.128
version with Mathis G4R engine (1 built)
M.129
pre-war version with Minié 4.DA 25 engine
M.129/48
definitive postwar version with Minié 4.DA 28 engine (23 built)
Mauboussin-Zodiac 17
Designation for Zodiac produced M.120 aircraft

== Operators ==
France

- French Air Force

== Specifications (M.123) ==
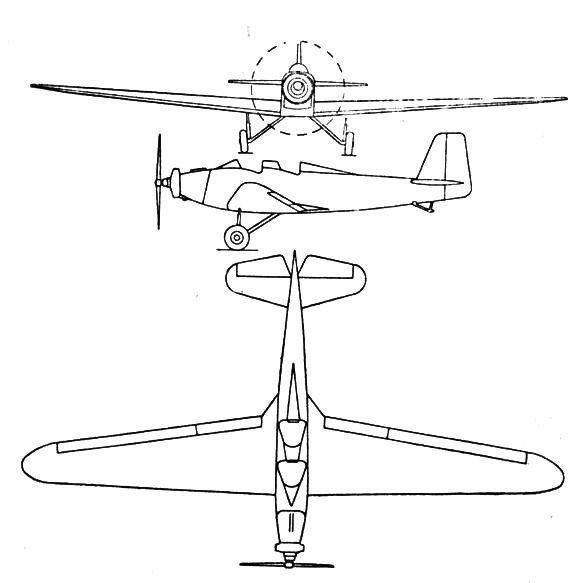
Mauboussin 123 3-view drawing from L'Aerophile February 1938

General characteristics

- Crew: Two, pilot and instructor
- Length: 6.8 m (22 ft 4 in)
- Wingspan: 11.74 m (38 ft 6 in)
- Height: 2.52 m (8 ft 3 in)
- Wing area: 13.0 m^{2} (140 sq ft)
- Empty weight: 349 kg (769 lb)
- Gross weight: 609 kg (1,343 lb)
- Powerplant: 1 × Salmson 9Adr , 45 kW (60 hp)

Performance

- Maximum speed: 160 km/h (100 mph, 87 kn)
- Range: 650 km (405 mi, 352 nmi)
- Service ceiling: 4,000 m (13,120 ft)
