= Zero-lift axis =

Aerodynamic concept

A typical lift coefficient curve.

A cambered aerofoil generates no lift when it is moving parallel to an axis called the zero-lift axis (or the zero-lift line.) When the angle of attack on an aerofoil is measured relative to the zero-lift axis it is true to say the lift coefficient is zero when the angle of attack is zero. For this reason, on a cambered aerofoil the zero-lift line is better than the chord line when describing the angle of attack.

When symmetric aerofoils are moving parallel to the chord line of the aerofoil, zero lift is generated. However, when cambered aerofoils are moving parallel to the chord line, lift is generated. (See diagram at right.) For symmetric aerofoils, the chord line and the zero lift line are the same.

== See also ==
- Angle of attack
- Aerobatics
- Aerobatic maneuver
