= Stagger (aeronautics) =

Distance one wing is positioned in front of another in a multiwing aircraft

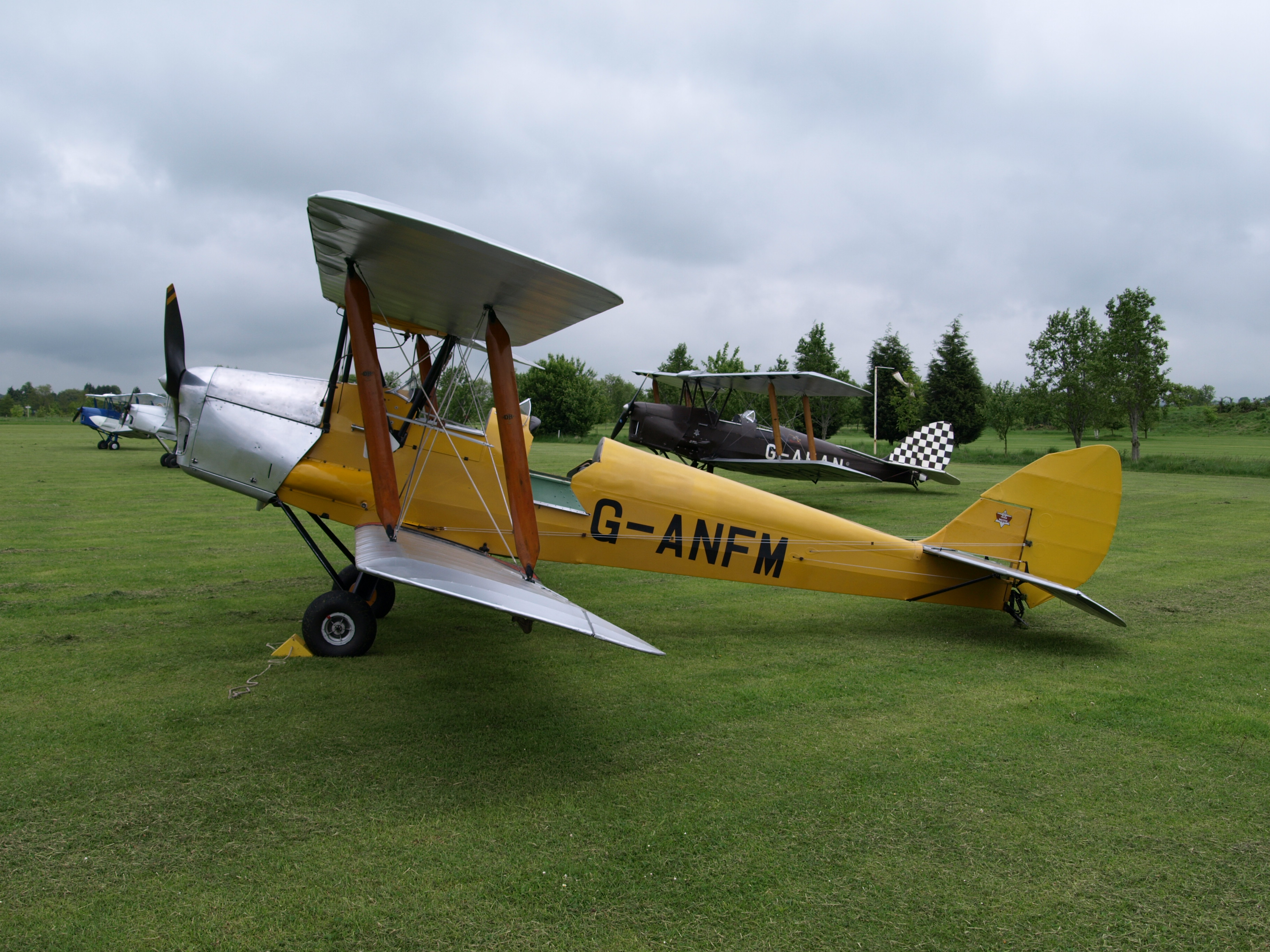
Positive wing stagger of a de Havilland Tiger Moth

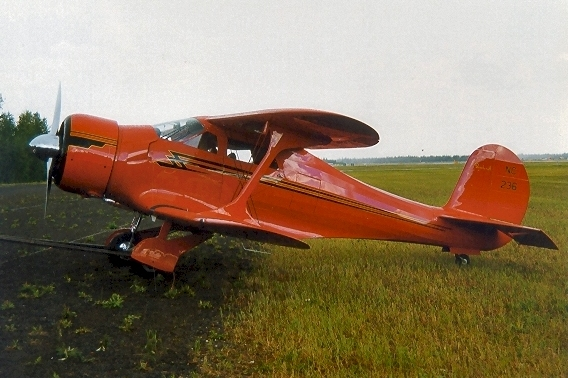
Negative stagger of a Beechcraft Model 17 Staggerwing in Alaska

In aviation, stagger is the relative horizontal fore-aft positioning of stacked wings in a biplane, triplane, or multiplane.

An aircraft is said to have positive stagger, or simply stagger, when the upper wing is positioned forward of the lower (bottom) wing, Examples include the de Havilland Tiger Moth or Stearman. Conversely, an aeroplane is said to have negative stagger in unusual cases where the upper wing is positioned behind the lower wing, as in the Sopwith Dolphin or Beech Model 17 Staggerwing. An aircraft with the wings positioned directly above each other is said to have unstaggered wings, as in the Sopwith Cuckoo or Vickers Vildebeest.

== Measurement ==
The value is sometimes expressed as a distance, s say, but it may also be written as a fraction or percentage of the 'gap' (distance g between wings), i.e. s/g. It may also be presented as an angle equal to tan^{−1}(s/g). The Gloster TSR.38 had a stagger of 0.91 m and a gap of 2.0 m, so the stagger might be written as 0.91 m, 0.455, 45.5% or 24.5°. s is the distance from the leading edge of the upper wing along its chord to the point of intersection of the chord with a line drawn perpendicularly to the chord of the upper wing at the leading edge of the lower wing, all lines being drawn in a plane parallel to the plane of symmetry.

== Effects ==
As a general rule, there is a tendency for the upper wing to contribute a greater proportion of the total lift than the lower with positive stagger, and less with negative stagger. Increase in positive stagger also tends to move the center of pressure forward on the upper wing and backward on the lower wing. When unstaggered, the centers of pressure for upper and lower wings are almost coincidental.

Lift comes from having air at a lower pressure above the wing than below. In the case of aircraft with more than one wing, one above the other, the higher pressure below the upper wing and the lower pressure above the lower wing will tend to equalize and so reduce the lift available. The closer together the wings are the more dramatic is this effect. The effect can be reduced by either increasing the gap between the wings, or moving one forward of the other. As increasing the gap may introduce other undesirable effects, stagger is usually applied to reduce the loss of lift.

Positive stagger is by far the most common, as this positioning of the upper wing(s) allows better visibility for the crew as well as increased aircraft longitudinal stability, aerodynamic efficiency and maximum lift.

== See also ==
- Decalage
