= Peyret-Mauboussin PM X =

1920s French light aircraft

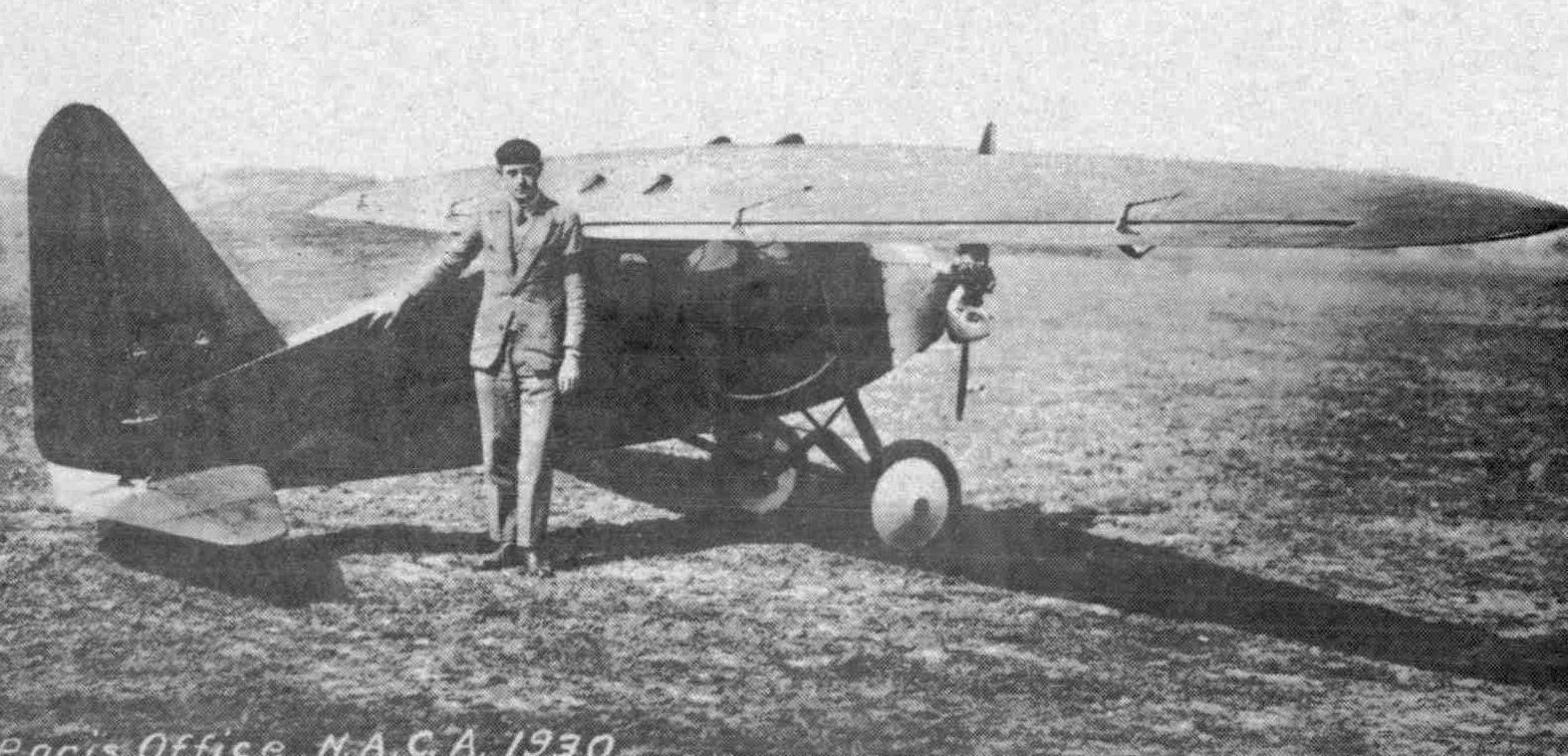

General information
- Type: Single seat sports aircraft
- National origin: France
- Manufacturer: (builder) Louis Peyret
- Designer: Pierre Mauboussin
- Number built: 1

History
- First flight: 7 December 1928
- Developed into: Peyret-Mauboussin PM XI

The Peyret-Mauboussin PM X, PM 4 (Note: The cited Flight article is the only contemporary one to use the type name P.M.4. They may have confused aircraft and airfoil names or both may have had the same name.) or Mauboussin M.10 was a low power, single-seat, high wing cantilever monoplane. Only one was built but it set several records in the under 250 kg (550 lb) class both as a landplane and a floatplane.

== Design and development ==
The Peyret-Mauboussin PM X was the first of three designs to come from the firm formed by Pierre Mauboussin and Louis Peyret in 1928. It was designed to be as simple, inexpensive and cheap to run as possible to encourage more people to fly and was originally intended to compete at the September 1928 Orly International Lightplane Competition (Concourse d'avions légere) but was not completed in time.

It had a one-piece wing, straight-tapered in plan out to elliptical tips and mounted on top of the fuselage. It also tapered outwards in thickness, with a horizontal lower surface, and had reflexed camber or double curvature. Its aspect ratio of 10 was high for the period. Structurally, the all-wooden wing was built around two box spars, ribs and three-ply skin. There were narrow-chord, full-span ailerons, each divided into two parts, the outer section conventional and the inner serving as a camber-changing flap.

The PM X was powered by a 25 kW (34 hp) ABC Scorpion II flat-twin engine, mounted in the nose with its cylinder heads exposed for cooling. Its fuel tanks were in the wing. The fuselage was a strikingly short, flat-sided, rectangular section structure, formed by four spruce longerons and double ply covered, with the pilot's enclosed cabin under the wing leading edge; the PM X's tapered nose gave him a good forward view. Behind him there was a luggage space, capable of accommodating a passenger seat. Access to the cabin was via a port-side door. Behind the cabin the fuselage tapered markedly to a vertical tail, the shape of which became a Mauboussin trademark. It was tall, strongly straight-tapered to a rounded tip and carried a deep unbalanced rudder. The horizontal tail was also strongly straight-tapered, with an unbalanced one-piece elevator and mounted on the fuselage underside, clear of the bottom of the rudder.

Its landing gear was fixed and conventional, with mainwheels on split, cranked axles mounted on a central inverted strut-pyramid from the lower fuselage longerons. There were rearward drag struts to the longerons as well as rubber cord shock absorbing struts. The undercarriage track was 1.30 m (4 ft 3 in). The PM X had a short, castering tailskid.

== Operational history ==
The PM X was first flown on 7 December 1928, piloted by Charles Fauvel. In September 1929, flying from le Bourget, he began to set a series of world records for light aircraft in the under 200 kg (440 lb) empty weight 4th category. On 4 September he covered 100 km (62 mi; 54 nmi) at 139.54 km/h (86.71 mph; 75.35 kn) and the following day reached an altitude of 5,193 m (17,037 ft). On the 6 September he covered 700 km (430 mi; 380 nmi) on a closed circuit and on the 10th flew a straight line record of 852.1 km (529.5 mi; 460.1 nmi). A year later he extended the circuit record to 1,258 km (782 mi; 679 nmi) and added a duration record of 12 h 3 m.

The M.10 was then modified into a seaplane (Hydravion in French), equipped with a pair of floats. Renamed the H.10, it first flew on 23 November 1930 and set more records in its new class. It was withdrawn from use after an accident on 24 October 1932.

== Variants ==
M.10
Original PM X, as described.
M.10bis
Alternative designation for the H.10 floatplane
H.10
M.10 converted to floatplane

== Specifications (M.10, landplane) ==
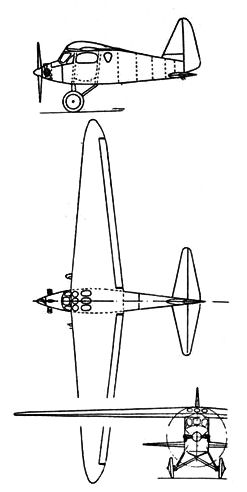
Peyret-Mauboussin PM X 3-view drawing from L'Aerophile-Salon 1934

Data from Les Ailes, April 1929.

General characteristics

- Crew: One
- Length: 4.4 m (14 ft 5 in)
- Height: 1.85 m (6 ft 1 in)
- Wing area: 10 m^{2} (110 sq ft)
- Airfoil: P.M.4
- Empty weight: 198 kg (437 lb)
- Gross weight: 334 kg (736 lb)
- Fuel capacity: 41 kg (90 lb), including oil
- Powerplant: 1 × ABC Scorpion II flat twin, 25 kW (34 hp) at 2,300 rpm
- Propellers: 2-bladed

Performance

- Maximum speed: 145 km/h (90 mph, 78 kn) at ground level
- Cruise speed: 125 km/h (78 mph, 67 kn)
- Endurance: 10 h
- Service ceiling: 7,000 m (23,000 ft) absolute
- Time to altitude: 17 min 35 s to 2,000 m (6,600 ft)
- Landing speed: 65 km/h (40 mph; 35 kn)
