= Decalage =

Aeronautical engineering measurement

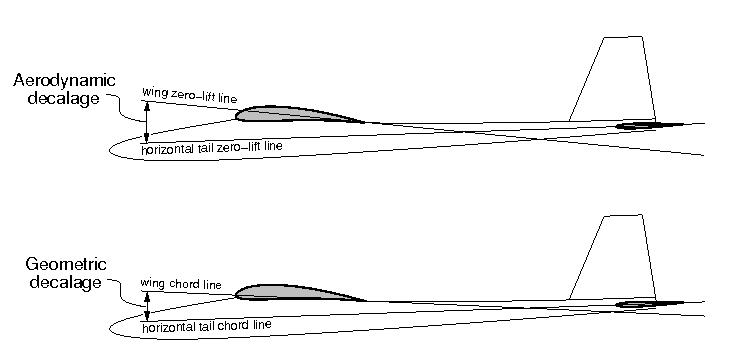
The tailplane definition of decalage can be further split into geometric and aerodynamic decalage.

Decalage on a fixed-wing aircraft is a measure of the relative incidences of wing surfaces. Various sources have defined it in multiple ways, depending on context:

1. On a biplane, decalage can refer to the angle difference between the upper and lower wings, i.e. the acute angle contained between the chords of the wings in question.
2. On other fixed-wing aircraft, decalage can refer to the difference in angle of the chord line of the wing and the chord line of the horizontal stabilizer. This is different from the angle of incidence, which refers to the angle of the wing chord to the longitudinal axis of the fuselage, without reference to the horizontal stabilizer.

== In biplanes ==
Decalage is said to be positive when the upper wing has a higher angle of incidence than the lower wing, and negative when the lower wing's incidence is greater than that of the upper wing. Positive decalage results in greater lift from the upper wing than the lower wing, the difference increasing with the amount of decalage.

In a survey of representative biplanes, real-life design decalage is typically zero, with both wings having equal incidence. A notable exception is the Stearman PT-17, which has 4° of incidence in the lower wing, and 3° in the upper wing. Considered from an aerodynamic perspective, it is desirable to have the forward-most wing stall first, which will induce a pitch-down moment, aiding in stall recovery. Biplane designers may use incidence to control stalling behavior, but may also use airfoil selection or other means to accomplish correct behavior.

== In other fixed-wing aircraft ==
In other fixed-wing aircraft, "decalage" typically refers to geometric decalage, which is the difference in the angle of the wing's chord line and the horizontal stabilizer's chord line.

The term "aerodynamic decalage" can refer to a similar angular measure that is taken with respect to each surface's respective zero-lift line rather than its chord line. Aerodynamic decalage may be modified in-flight through control surface deflections, as these change a surface's zero-lift line.

Aerodynamic decalage can be used to quickly assess the trim and stability of any two-surface airplane (e.g., a conventional or canard configuration, neglecting fuselage aerodynamics). This is based on the notable property that an airplane in stable ($C_{m\alpha}<0$), trimmed ($C_m=0$), and lifting ($C_L>0$) flight must have positive aerodynamic decalage. In other words, the forward wing will have a higher local wing loading than the aft wing.
