= Klemm Kl 36 =

1930s German monoplane

Kl 36
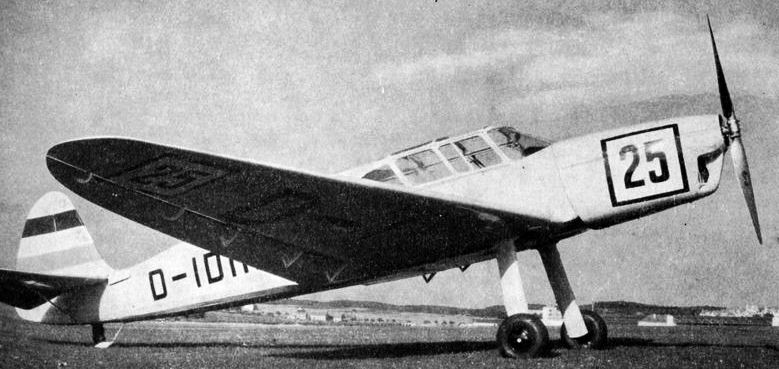

General information
- Type: Touring aircraft
- Manufacturer: Klemm
- Primary user: Germany
- Number built: 12(?)

History
- Manufactured: 1934
- Introduction date: 1934
- First flight: 1934

The Klemm Kl 36 is a 1930s German four-seat cabin touring and competition monoplane. It was designed by Klemm and Friedrich Fechner and built by Klemm.

== History ==
=== Development ===
Following the success of the 3-seat touring plane Klemm Kl 32 in the European touring plane championship Challenge 1932, the company was ordered by the German Reichs luftfahrt ministerium (RLM) to develop another aircraft to take part in Challenge 1934. Due to changes in contest rules, it had to be a more modern machine, a 4-seater, featuring better performance and better STOL capabilities. As a result, the Kl 36 was a streamlined, comfortable four-seat plane with wing mechanization. It was the fastest of all Klemm's builds.

Four aircraft were built of the Kl 36A series (two powered by 225 hp (168 kW) Argus As 17 inverted 6-cylinder in-line engines, and two by 250 hp (190 kW) Hirth HM8U inverted V8 engines - D-IHEK, D-IHAV. Both engines were air-cooled).

Later, 8 0-series aircraft were built, designated Kl 36B. They were powered with different engines, including 160 hp (120 kW) Siemens-Halske Sh 14 A-1 radial engines. One was completed with retractable landing gear (D-IUHU). Because there was no weight limit, they were somewhat heavier than the Kl 36A.

== Operational history ==
Four Kl 36As took part in the Challenge 1934 touring plane championship in August–September, but none completed a rally over Europe. Fritz Morzik, who won two challenges, had to withdraw due to a fuel pump breakdown, but flew the rally track off the contest. During the technical part, they obtained good results in a minimal speed trial (57.67 km/h), but proved generally inferior to the Fieseler Fi 97.

During World War II, Klemm Kl 36s served as a liaison aircraft in the Luftwaffe.

== Technical description ==
The Klemm Kl 36 is a mixed-construction, low-wing, cantilever monoplane. It contains a conventional tail unit, a three-part wing structure, and a steel frame fuselage with a canvas covering. Surfaces on the outer parts of the wings and tail are covered in plywood. The wings are fitted with slats and flaps, which fold rearwards. The plane has a fixed tail skid landing gear. The landing wheels were often fit with teardrop covers. The median load of the plane was 490 kg, and the fuel tank had a capacity of 230L. The plane used a two-blade propeller, powered by a front-mounted engine.

The Kl 36 could fit 3 people, including the pilot.

== Specifications ==
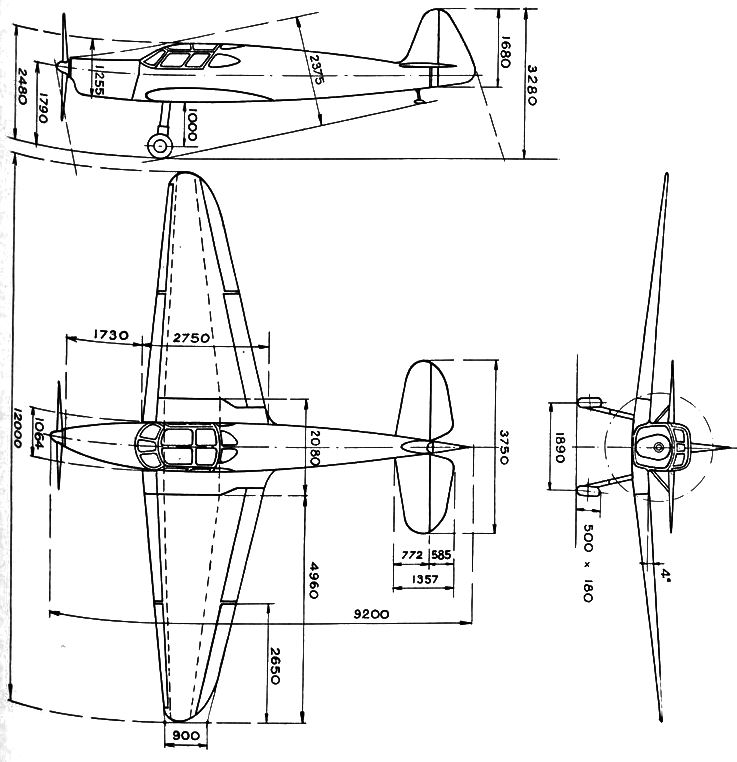
Klemm Kl 36 3-view drawing from L'Aerophile October 1934

Data from Międzynarodowe turnieje lotnicze 1929–1934

General characteristics

- Crew: 1
- Capacity: 3 passengers
- Length: 9.2 m (30 ft 2 in)
- Wingspan: 12 m (39 ft 4 in)
- Height: 2.38 m (7 ft 10 in)
- Wing area: 19.5 m^{2} (210 sq ft)
- Empty weight: 560 kg (1,235 lb)
- Gross weight: 1,050 kg (2,315 lb)
- Powerplant: 1 × Argus As 17A 6-cylinder inverted in-line piston engine, 168 kW (225 hp)

Performance

- Maximum speed: 250 km/h (160 mph, 130 kn)
- Cruise speed: 220 km/h (140 mph, 120 kn)
- Service ceiling: 5,900 m (19,400 ft)

== See also ==
Aircraft of comparable role, configuration, and era

- Aero A.200
- Caproni PS.1
- Caudron Simoun
- Fieseler Fi 97
- Messerschmitt Bf 108
- Percival Vega Gull
- PZL.26
