= Fieseler Fi 97 =

1930s German Aircraft

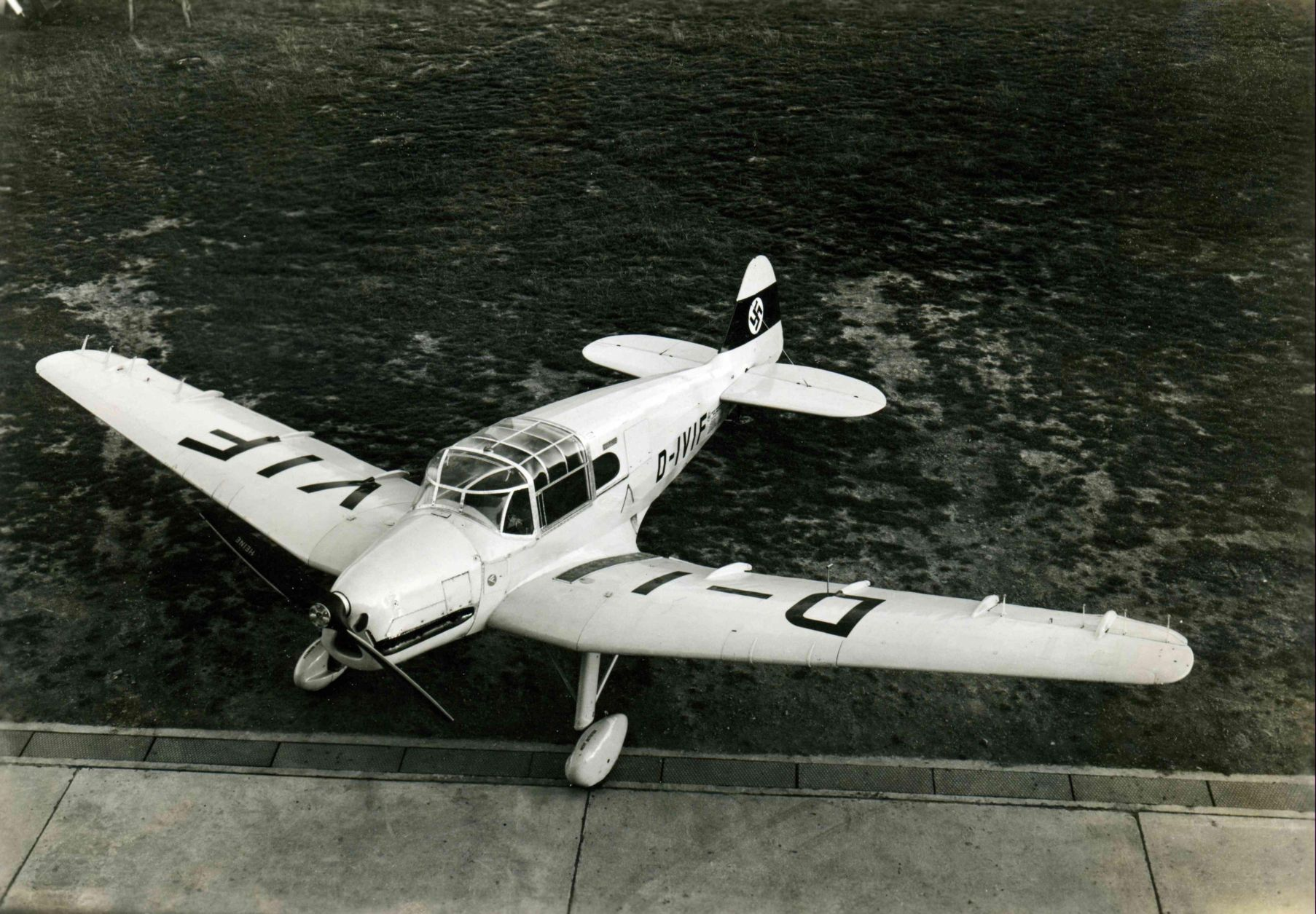

General information
- Type: Touring aircraft
- Manufacturer: Fieseler
- Primary user: Germany
- Number built: 5

History
- Manufactured: 1934
- Introduction date: 1934
- First flight: 1934

The Fieseler Fi 97 was a 1930s German four-seat cabin touring and competition monoplane aircraft designed and built by the German manufacturer Fieseler.

== Design and development ==
Following the success of their two-seat tourer/trainer the Fieseler F5, Fieseler was encouraged by the German Reichsluftfahrtministerium (RLM) to develop a four-seat version specially to take part in the European touring plane championship Challenge 1934.

The result of this request was the Fi 97, designed by Kurt Arnolt. It was a mixed-construction low-wing cantilever monoplane with a conventional tail unit. The fuselage had a fabric-covered steel tubing frame. The wing structure was wood and was covered with fabric and plywood. The wings were able to be folded aft for storage or ground transport. The tailskid undercarriage was fixed. The pilot and three passengers had an enclosed cabin.

Five examples of the Fi 97 were built. Three aircraft were fitted with the Hirth HM 8U, 250 hp inverted V8 engine, and two used the Argus As 17A, 225 hp inverted 6-cylinder inline engine. Both engines are air-cooled.

The plane had STOL capabilities and the most significant design aspect was the wing's high-lift devices to enable the aircraft to be flown at low speeds. The leading-edge had Handley Page type automatic slats over more than half of the span. The trailing edge had Fieseler-designed Ausrollflügel, a Fowler-type trailing-edge flap. The trailing-edge flap increased the wing area by nearly 20%. These high-lift features allowed the aircraft to be controlled down to 58 km/h (36 mph). These features were later utilized in construction of the famous Fieseler Fi 156 Storch.

== Operational history ==
Five Fi 97s took part in the Challenge 1934 touring plane championship in August–September, and Hans Seidemann took third place in an Argus-powered Fi 97, bested by only two Polish RWD-9s. A significant achievement was that all the Fieselers completed the contest (places: 3, 9, 12, 13, 16), especially comparing to other German aircraft. Among pilots was also Wolf Hirth. Among others, they scored 1st and 3rd results in a short landing trial (best result - 75 m, from over 8 m-high gate) and very good results in a short take-off (78.3 m over 8 m-high gate) and minimal speed trial (58.49 km/h).

== Specifications ==
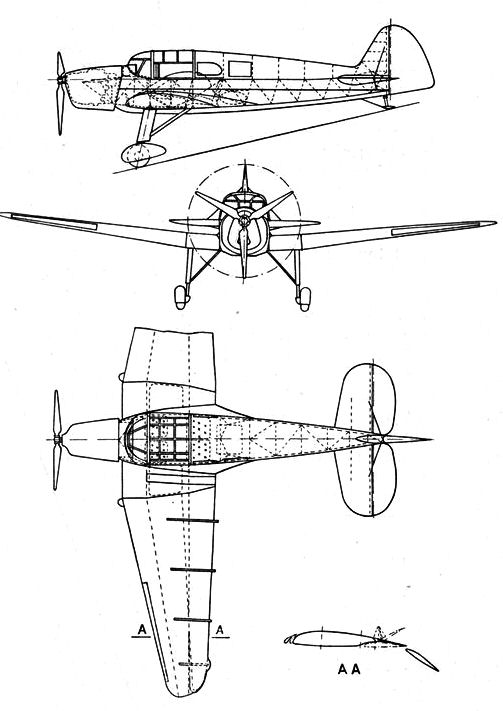
Fieseler Fi 97 3-view drawing from L'Aerophile October 1934

Data from The Illustrated Encyclopedia of Aircraft (Part Work 1982–1985), 1985, Orbis Publishing, Page 1812/3

General characteristics

- Crew: 1
- Capacity: 3 passengers
- Length: 8.04 m (26 ft 4.5 in)
- Wingspan: 10.70 m (35 ft 1.25 in)
- Height: 2.36 m (7 ft 9 in)
- Wing area: 15.30 m^{2} (164.69 sq ft)
- Empty weight: 560 kg (1,235 lb)
- Gross weight: 1,050 kg (2,315 lb)
- Powerplant: 1 × Argus As 17A 6-cylinder inverted inline piston engine , 168 kW (225 hp)

Performance

- Maximum speed: 245 km/h (152 mph, 132 kn)
- Range: 1,200 km (746 mi, 648 nmi)
- Service ceiling: 7,300 m (23,950 ft)
- Rate of climb: 5.583 m/s (1,165 ft/min)

== See also ==
Aircraft of comparable role, configuration, and era

- Aero A.200
- Caproni PS.1
- Klemm Kl 36
- Messerschmitt Bf 108
- Percival Vega Gull
- PZL.26
