= PZL.26 =

Polish sports plane built in 1934

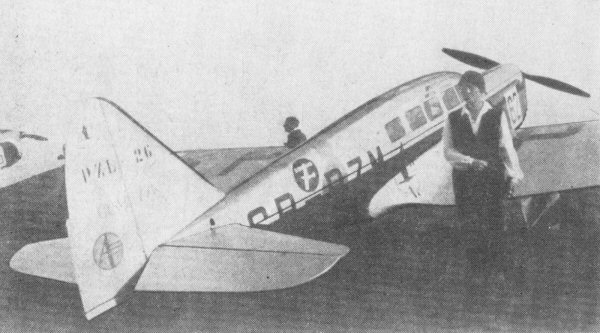
- PZL.26 SP-PZM of Ignacy Giedgowd during the Challenge 1934

General information
- Type: Sports plane
- Manufacturer: PZL
- Primary user: Polish civilian aviation
- Number built: 5

History
- Manufactured: 1934
- Introduction date: 1934
- First flight: 1934
- Retired: 1939
- Developed into: PZL.55

PZL.26 was a Polish sports plane built in 1934 by the Państwowe Zakłady Lotnicze. Ordered by the Ministry of Defence, it was specifically designed for the upcoming Challenge 1934 International Touring Aircraft Contest.

== Design and development ==
The PZL.26 was a development of the PZL.19, that was built for previous Challenge 1932 contest. Like its predecessor, it was designed by Jerzy Dąbrowski and Franciszek Misztal in 1933. The plane was an all-metal cantilever low-wing monoplane with a fixed landing gear and a closed canopy. It retained wings and tail of the PZL.19, with minor changes. A fuselage, wings and landing gear were more streamlined and strengthened. The main change was a stronger engine, a US-made 265 hp Menasco Buccaneer B-6S3 engine. The engine choice appeared to be a failure, though. Five aircraft were built in 1934 and one prototype for static trials. They carried registration markings: SP-PZL to PZP.

== Operational history ==
All five PZL.26s took part in the Challenge from August 28 to September 16, 1934. A 9538 km long rally over Europe appeared too difficult for engines, and three aircraft failed to finish the rally due to engine breakdowns (pilots: Szczepan Grzeszczyk, Andrzej Włodarkiewicz and Jan Balcer). Piotr Dudziński (SP-PZL) took the 11th place and Ignacy Giedgowd (SP-PZM) the 17th place (by coincidence, these results were similar to those of PZL.19s, two years earlier). Giedgowd's engine failed during a maximum speed trial, though. It is noteworthy, that they had the 2nd and 4th results of average speed in the rally - 211 and 213 km/h.

In Autumn 1934, the PZL.26 SP-PZM was presented at the Paris Air Show. Because of unreliable engines and quite big fuel consumption resulting from their high power output, most PZL.26s were not used in Polish sports aviation much after the Challenge. SP-PZL, -PZM, -PZN and - PZP were removed from the registry on July 1, 1936. The SP-PZO was used until the war in 1939 by the Pomeranian Aeroclub in Toruń. Possibly also the other one was used in this Aeroclub.

In 1939 Jerzy Dąbrowski made a preliminary design of a fast fighter plane PZL.55, being a far development of the PZL.26's construction, powered by Hispano-Suiza 1100 hp engine, but it was not realized due to World War II.

== Description ==
Metal construction low-wing monoplane, conventional in layout. Fuselage of a steel frame covered with duralumin in front and canvas in the rear. Trapezoid three-part wing with elliptical ends, covered with duralumin. Wings were fitted with automatic slats and split flaps. Wings were folding rearwards. Cab had three seats in tandem, under a common multi-part canopy, with double controls for the first two crewmen. Fixed landing gear with a rear skid, main wheels in massive aerodynamical covers. Two-blade metal propeller. Fuel tanks in wings and smaller one in the fuselage (180 L). Cruise fuel consumption 60 L/h.

== Specifications ==
Data from Polish aircraft 1893-1939

General characteristics

- Crew: 1
- Capacity: 2 / 445 kg (981 lb) payload
- Length: 7.5 m (24 ft 7 in)
- Wingspan: 10.42 m (34 ft 2 in)
- Height: 2 m (6 ft 7 in)
- Wing area: 16.3 m^{2} (175 sq ft)
- Empty weight: 560 kg (1,235 lb)
- Max takeoff weight: 1,005 kg (2,216 lb)
- Fuel capacity: 180 L (48 US gal; 40 imp gal) in wing centre-section tanks with a 15 L (4.0 US gal; 3.3 imp gal) gravity collector tank in the fuselage; 15 L (4.0 US gal; 3.3 imp gal) oil tank
- Powerplant: × Menasco Buccaneer B-6S.3 6-cylinder air-cooledinverted in-line piston engine, 150 kW (200 hp) max. continuous power

198 kW (265 hp) for take-off

- Propellers: 2-bladed Letov adjustable-pitch metal propeller

Performance

- Maximum speed: 302 km/h (188 mph, 163 kn) at sea level
- Cruise speed: 250 km/h (160 mph, 130 kn)
- Minimum speed: 60 km/h (37 mph; 32 kn)
- Range: 800 km (500 mi, 430 nmi)
- Ferry range: 1,000 km (620 mi, 540 nmi)
- Service ceiling: 7,500 m (24,600 ft)
- Rate of climb: 5 m/s (980 ft/min)
- Wing loading: 61.4 kg/m^{2} (12.6 lb/sq ft)
- Power/mass: 0.1981 kW/kg (0.1205 hp/lb)
- Take-off run: 75 m (246 ft)
- Landing run: 80 m (262 ft)

== See also ==
Related development

- PZL.19
- PZL.55

Aircraft of comparable role, configuration, and era

- Fieseler Fi 97
- Messerschmitt Bf 108
- Klemm Kl 36
- Breda Ba.39
- Praga BH-111
- Percival Gull
