= Challenge International de Tourisme 1934 =

The Challenge 1934 was the fourth and last FAI International Tourist Plane Contest (French: Challenge International de Tourisme), that took place between August 28 and September 16, 1934, in Warsaw, Poland. The four Challenges, from 1929 to 1934, were major aviation events in pre-war Europe. The 1934 Challenge was won by the Polish pilots, who had also won the previous year.

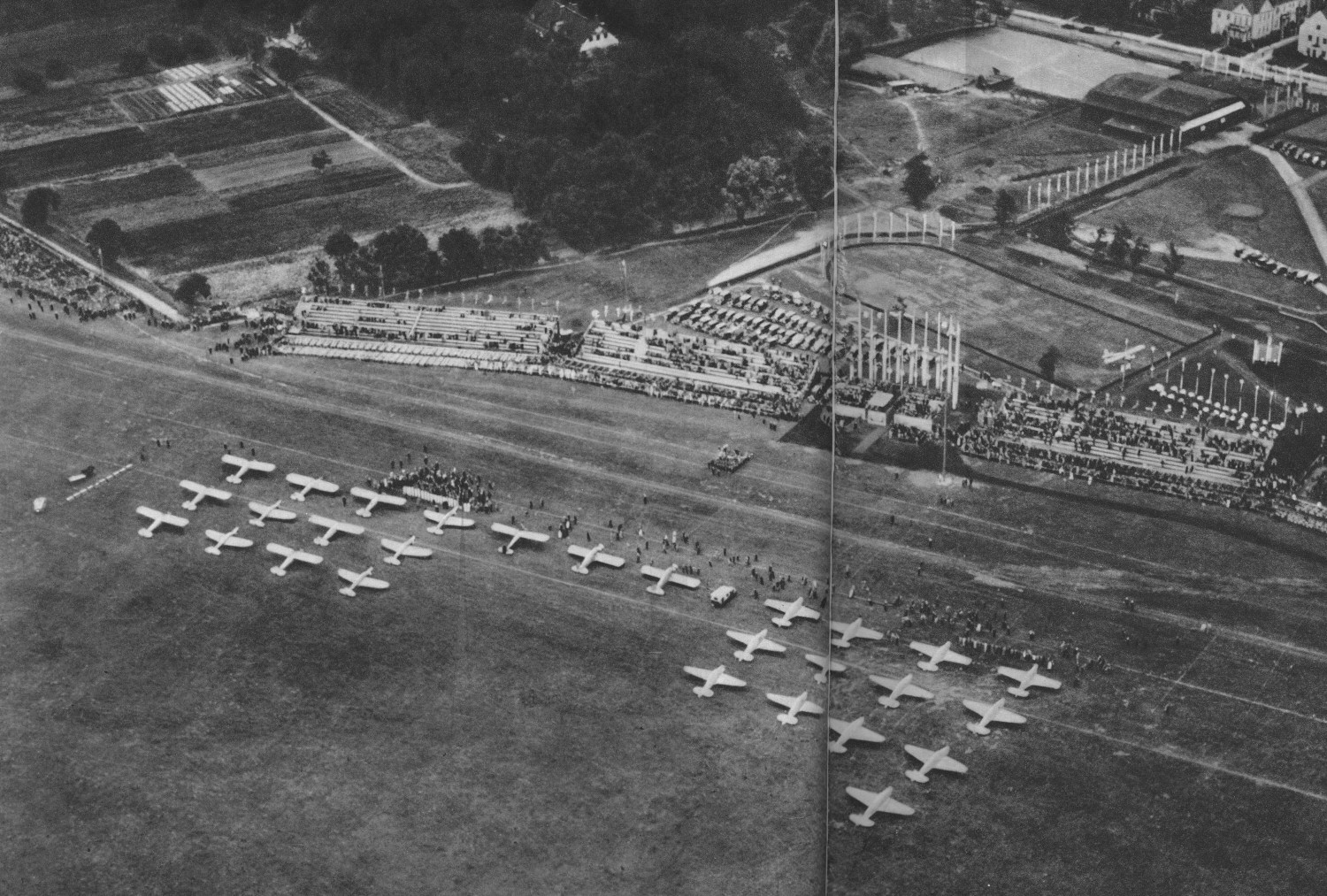
The opening ceremony, from the left: Polish team, three-aircraft Czechoslovak team, German team. The Italian team had not arrived yet.

== Overview ==
Poland and the Polish Aero Club organized the contest because a Polish pilot Franciszek Żwirko had won the previous Challenge in 1932. The contest rules were announced in June 1933: like the previous contest, it consisted of three parts: technical trials, a rally over Europe and a maximum speed trial, but there were changes in details. Since one of the aims of the Challenges was to stimulate the development of tourist aircraft, a stress was placed upon aircraft performance and quality, although pilots' skills remained crucial.

The opening ceremony was held at noon on August 28, 1934, at Mokotowskie field in Warsaw (the Italian team was late by two hours due to weather and arrived during the ceremony). During an air show, a Polish fighter PZL P.7a performing aerobatics crashed, but the pilot survived with injuries.

The number of crews and aircraft that eventually took part in the 1934 Challenge was smaller - 34 compared to 43 in the 1932 Challenge, because the contest was more difficult. The aircraft flew with a two-man crew (pilot and mechanic). Only four countries entered teams for the Challenge in 1934: Poland (12 crews), Germany (13 crews), Italy (6 crews) and Czechoslovakia (3 crews). The British aviator Walter MacPherson entered the contest in the Polish team. The French team of eight crews resigned from the contest, because a development of a new aircraft, the Caudron C.500 had not finished in time and its weight was too great. The first prize in the Challenge was 100,000 French francs, the second 40,000 FF, the third 20,000 FF and the fourth 10,000 FF; 15 other crews would get 6,000 FF.

== Aircraft ==
The Challenge was to be a contest of tourist aircraft, so competing aircraft had to be able to take at least two persons aboard, take off and land on a short field and cover a distance with a good cruise speed. For this Challenge, all countries designed new aircraft especially to meet the contest demands, the only exception was a single de Havilland Puss Moth flown by MacPherson, although this had been was modified for the competition. All these aircraft were monoplanes with 3 or 4 seats in an enclosed cabin, advanced wing design with (flaps and slats and some other devices) and mixed or metal construction.

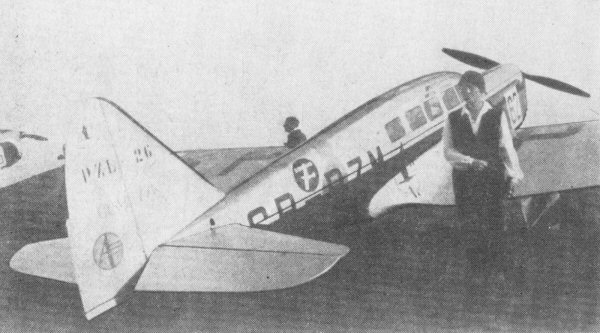
The Polish PZL.26 of Ignacy Giedgowd in the Challenge markings

Most aircraft were fast cantilever low-wing monoplanes: the German Messerschmitt Bf 108 (4), Fieseler Fi 97 (5) and Klemm Kl 36 (4), the Polish PZL.26 (5) and the Italian Pallavicino PS-1 (2) or braced low-wing monoplanes: the Czechoslovak Aero A.200 (2) and the Italian Breda Ba.39 (2) and Ba.42 (2). An exception were the basic aircraft of the Polish team - high-wing braced monoplanes RWD-9 (7), one of which was also flown by the Czechoslovak crew, and the Puss Moth. Of those, the Bf 108 and PS-1 had a retractable landing gear.

The German aircraft had starting numbers from a range 12-26, the Italian 41-46, the Czechoslovak 51-54 and the Polish 61-81: the numbers were placed on the fuselage in a black square frame.

== Technical trials ==
On August 29 the technical evaluation of the competing aircraft's construction started. Since it was a tourist aircraft contest, features such as a comfortable cabin with a good view, the presence of the third and fourth seats, seats placed side-by-side, a comprehensive set of controls, ease and time of engine starting, ease of wings' folding, safety devices and modern construction with the use of metal were awarded points. The view was evaluated by placing a lamp in the cabin while the aircraft was in a dark hangar and examining light area. All the German aircraft, two Italian and the Puss Moth exceeded the empty weight limit of 560.56 kg (1,235.8 lb) and had to have some unnecessary parts removed. The first technical trial to be completed was a quick engine starting, carried on 31 August-1 September. Most aircraft scored the maximum 24 points in it.

Technical evaluation lasted until September 4, and the most points were given to the Bf 108s (450-452 pts), followed by the Pallavicino PS-1 (438 pts), the Fi 97s (428-431 pts), the Aero A.200 (429 pts) and the RWD-9 (427 pts). The other scores were: Klemm Kl 36 - 394-407 pts, PZL.26 - 383 pts, Puss Moth - 373 pts and Bredas - 323-346 pts.

On September 3–4 there was a short take off trial, which required the crews to fly over an 8 m (26 ft) high barrier. The best performer was the Czechoslovak Vojtěch Žáček, taking off from the closest distance of 74.5 m (244 ft) (Aero A.200), then Jerzy Bajan (RWD-9) and Ján Ambruš with the second A.200. The Polish RWD-9s and PZL.26s and the German Fi 97s also performed well, while the Italians and most other German aircraft appeared inferior, with results above 100 m (328 ft). For comparison, the best result from the previous Challenge was 91.6 m (301 ft).

Top results of the short take-off trial
	Pilot	country	aircraft	distance	points
1.	Vojtěch Žáček	Czechoslovakia	Aero A.200	74.5 m	141 pts
2.	Jerzy Bajan	Poland	RWD-9S	76.1 m	140 pts
3.	Ján Ambruš	Czechoslovakia	Aero A.200	77.6 m	138 pts
4.	Szczepan Grzeszczyk	Poland	PZL.26	78.2 m	138 pts
5.	Gerhard Hubrich	Nazi Germany	Fieseler Fi 97	78.3 m	138 pts

After the technical evaluation and the short take-off trial, on September 4 the leaders were the Germans flying Bf 108s: Theo Osterkamp (597 points), Werner Junck (596 points) and Otto Brindlinger (594 points), then Vojtěch Žáček (A.200, 594 points), Jerzy Bajan (RWD-9, 591 points) and Ján Ambruš (A.200, 591 points), then German Fi 97s and Polish RWD-9s.

Next, on September 4–5, followed a short landing trial, behind an 8-m high barrier. The best result, 75 m (246 ft) (210 points) was achieved by Hans Seidemann (Fi 97). In the first ten scores there were other Fieselers, the Polish RWD-9s and PZL.26s and MacPherson's Puss Moth. The Czechoslovak A.200s had the worst results, above 117 m (384 ft), along with Bredas and Bf 108s. The best result from the previous Challenge was 92.4 metres (303 ft).

Top results of the short landing trial
	Pilot	country	aircraft	distance	points
1.	Hans Seidemann	Nazi Germany	Fieseler Fi 97	75 m	210 pts
2.	Tadeusz Karpiński	Poland	PZL.26	78.2 m	208 pts
3.	Gerhard Hubrich	Nazi Germany	Fieseler Fi 97	79 m	206 pts
4.	Andrzej Włodarkiewicz	Poland	PZL.26	79.7 m	205 pts
5.	Jerzy Bajan	Poland	RWD-9S	79.8 m	205 pts
6.	Walter MacPherson	Poland/United Kingdom	DH-80A	80.8 m	203 pts

A fuel consumption trial on a 594 km (369 mi) closed circuit was held on September 5. The best were three Bf 108s, scoring 86-95 pts, then five Poles with 73-79 points. Quite good results were scored by the Italians, while the German Fi 97s and Kl 36s and the Czechoslovaks were worst in this trial.

Top results of the fuel consumption trial
	Pilot	country	aircraft	kg/100 km	points
1.	Karl Francke	Nazi Germany	Bf 108A	10.5	95 pts
2.	Werner Junck	Nazi Germany	Bf 108A	11.07	90 pts
3.	Theo Osterkamp	Nazi Germany	Bf 108A	11.48	86 pts
4.	Jerzy Bajan	Poland	RWD-9S	12.11	79 pts
5.	Szczepan Grzeszczyk	Poland	PZL.26	12.26	78 pts

After further trials had been completed, on September 5 the leaders of a general classification changed and remained similar until the end of this part. Leaders were: Jerzy Bajan (RWD-9S, 875 pts), Tadeusz Karpiński (RWD-9S, 856 pts), Hans Seidemann (Fi 97, 850 pts), Gerhard Hubrich (Fi 97, 848 pts), Stanisław Płonczyński (RWD-9, 844 pts), then Karl Francke (Bf 108), Jan Buczyński (RWD-9), Wolf Hirth (Fi 97), Szczepan Grzeszczyk (PZL.26).

A minimal speed trial started on August 31, but it had to be continued on September 2 due to weather and some crews completed it only on September 6. The Pole Jerzy Bajan flying the RWD-9 was the slowest with a speed of 54.14 km/h (33.64 mph). Good results below 60 km/h were obtained by the other RWD-9s, the Czechoslovaks and the German Kl 36s and Fi 97s; the worst were Italian Bredas - above 75 km/h, what was not scored (a new device - slots in wings fitted in Bredas, proved useless in practice).

Top results of the minimal speed trial
	Pilot	country	aircraft	speed	points
1.	Jerzy Bajan	Poland	RWD-9S	54.14 km/h	83 pts
2.	Jan Anderle	Czechoslovakia	RWD-9W	55.24 km/h	79 pts
3.	Ján Ambruš	Czechoslovakia	Aero A.200	55.88 km/h	76 pts
4.	Stanisław Płonczyński	Poland	RWD-9S	56.72 km/h	73 pts
5.	Wolfgang Stein	Nazi Germany	Klemm Kl 36	57.67 km/h	69 pts
6.	Fritz Morzik	Nazi Germany	Klemm Kl 36	57.78 km/h	68 pts

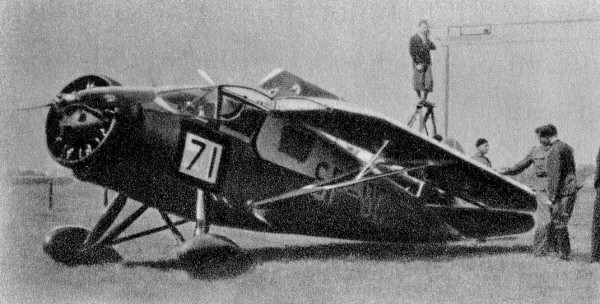
Bajan's RWD-9 during a wing folding trial.

On September 1 there was a trial of quick folding of wings, which was a feature to save space in hangars. Also the aircraft dimensions and the way of folding were awarded points. The trial was completed only on September 6, and first 7 results were of RWD-9s with 36 points, followed by four Italians.

One German and one Italian crews damaged their aircraft during technical trials (Bf 108 and PS-1) and had to retire. It was however the best ratio of crews to complete the technical trials of all Challenges. Generally, top places were taken by RWD-9s and Fi 97s, while Bf 108s, Kl 36s and PZL.26s proved average, and Italian machines closed a list with 559-801 points.

Top results after the technical trials
	Pilot	Country	Aircraft	Points
1.	Jerzy Bajan	Poland	RWD-9S	994 pts
2.	Tadeusz Karpiński	Poland	RWD-9S	954 pts
3.	Stanisław Płonczyński	Poland	RWD-9S	953 pts
4.	Hans Seidemann	Nazi Germany	Fieseler Fi 97	939 pts
5.	Gerhard Hubrich	Nazi Germany	Fieseler Fi 97	936 pts
6.	Jan Buczyński	Poland	RWD-9S	920 pts
7.	Stefan Florjanowicz	Poland	RWD-9W	919 pts
8-10.	Wolf Hirth	Nazi Germany	Fieseler Fi 97	915 pts
8-10.	Ján Ambruš	Czechoslovakia	Aero A.200	915 pts
8-10.	Jan Anderle	Czechoslovakia	RWD-9W	915 pts

== Rally over Europe ==
The second part of the Challenge was a 9537.4 km rally over Europe and northern Africa, on a path: Warsaw - Königsberg - Berlin - Köln - Brussels - Paris - Bordeaux - Pau - Madrid - Seville - Casablanca - Meknes - Sidi Bel Abbes - Algiers (stage waypoint) - Biskra - Tunis - Palermo - Naples - Rome - Rimini - Zagreb - Vienna - Brno - Prague - Katowice - Lwów - Wilno - Warsaw. There were also 8 checkpoints, among others, in Tanger, Messina and Castelfranco Veneto. The route was far longer and more difficult, than in previous contests. Awarded were, first of all, a cruise speed on a whole track, then a regularity of flight. Three nights apart from appointed airfields or a cruise speed below 130 km/h caused disqualification.

The rally started on September 7, in rain, between 5 and 5.30 am. The Bf 108s could take advantage of their speed and were first to reach Berlin. That day 24 fastest crews reached Paris, flying 1752.4 km (10 Poles, 8 Germans, 3 Czechoslovaks and 3 Italians). The German Wolfgang Stein (Kl 36) and the Italian team's captain Ambrogio Colombo (Ba-42) had to land and quit due to engine faults. Several crews had similar problems, but managed to repair them.

On the next day, many crews, who started early, especially flying Bf 108s, had problems with locating an airfield in Bordeaux due to heavy fog and had forced landings, lowering their cruise speed (on that occasion, Theo Osterkamp and Gerhard Hubrich had problems with the local police). One Klemm Kl 36 was damaged during a forced landing and had to withdraw (Ernst Krüger). Most - 14 crews reached Seville that day, 9 stayed in Madrid, while last two crews remained in Bordeaux, including Stanisław Płonczyński (RWD-9). Two Poles (Andrzej Włodarkiewicz and Szczepan Grzeszczyk on PZL.26s) reached as far, as Casablanca (3715.2 km).

On September 9 all crews, that remained in the rally, reached Africa, with Andrzej Włodarkiewicz and three Bf 108s being in the lead. 18 crews reached Algiers that day (9 Poles, 6 Germans and 3 Czechs), flying 4774 km in total. Last two crews reached Meknes, including Stanisław Płonczyński. Several crews withdrew that day: Fritz Morzik (the winner of 1929 and 1930 Challenges, flying Kl 36) had three forced landings before Algiers due to a fuel pump fault, also Szczepan Grzeszczyk's PZL.26's engine failed and he had a forced landing before Sidi Bel Abbes. Other German Kraft Eberhard (Kl 36) withdrew in Spain due to wing damage, the Pole Tadeusz Karpiński (RWD-9) quit in Seville because of low cruise speed, and one Italian quit because of illness (Pierro de Angeli). On September 10 the rest reached Algiers, and thus 24 crews completed the first part of the rally. The Pole Stefan Florjanowicz (RWD-9) had to withdraw there due to engine fault.

The contestants left Algiers on September 11, after a rest, and 23 crews reached Tunis that day. On September 12, the crews left for Palermo, over the Mediterranean Sea. The flight was secured by the Italian Navy and the French floatplanes. 22 crews reached Rome that day, one Italian pilot withdrew due to engine damage.

On September 13 the weather was bad, but all but two crews reached Prague (7924 km). The fastest that day was Theo Osterkamp (Bf 108), but other two Bf 108 pilots had forced landings near Trieste due to weather and spent night at Zagreb, what lowered their cruise speed.

On September 14, sixteen crews finished in Warsaw, greeted by crowds, the first was the Pole Ignacy Giedgowd (PZL-26). Among them were five Poles, six Germans, three Czechoslovaks and two Italians. That day, the fastest Polish pilot Andrzej Włodarkiewicz (PZL-26) had to land near Tarnów before Lwów and withdrew due to engine fault, also Walter MacPherson (Puss Moth) dropped out for the same reason before Lwów.

On September 15 last three crews reached Warsaw (Werner Junck and Karl Francke flying Bf 108s and Piotr Dudziński flying PZL.26). The last to drop out was Jan Balcer (PZL.26) due to a compressor damage, before Wilno. Fritz Morzik (Kl 36), Tadeusz Karpiński (RWD-9) and Andrzej Włodarkiewicz (PZL.26) finished that day in Warsaw, after repairing their aircraft, flying off the contest.

Only 19 crews out of 32 completed the rally. The only team to finish complete was the Czechoslovak one; apart from their A.200s, only all Fieseler Fi 97s completed the contest. In spite of highest maximum cruise speeds, the results of fastest Bf 108s was hampered by low cruise speeds in other stages of the rally. Best results were obtained by pilots who managed to maintain a good cruise speed during the whole rally. All participants who completed the rally, scored maximal number of 160 points for regularity, spending nights on appointed airfields only.

Top results of the race
	Pilot	Country	Aircraft	Average speed	Points
1.	Georg Pasewaldt	Nazi Germany	Fieseler Fi 97	215.33 km/h	880 pts
2.	Ignacy Giedgowd	Poland	PZL.26	213.33 km/h	880 pts
3.	Ján Ambruš	Czechoslovakia	Aero A.200	211.12 km/h	880 pts
4.	Piotr Dudziński	Poland	PZL.26	211.05 km/h	880 pts
5.	Theo Osterkamp	Nazi Germany	Bf 108	208.74 km/h	875 pts
6.	Hans Seidemann	Nazi Germany	Fieseler Fi 97	208.28 km/h	874 pts
7.	Stanisław Płonczyński	Poland	RWD-9	206.89 km/h	868 pts
8.	Jerzy Bajan	Poland	RWD-9	205.15 km/h	861 pts
9.	Jan Anderle	Czechoslovakia	RWD-9	203.69 km/h	855 pts
10.	Kurt Bayer	Nazi Germany	Fieseler Fi 97	203.47 km/h	854 pts

After the technical trials and the race, Jerzy Bajan held first place in the general classification with 1855 points, with Stanisław Płonczyński in second with 1821 pts, Hans Seidemann in third with 1813 pts, followed by two Czechoslovaks, Slovak Ján Ambruš (1795 pts) and Czech Jan Anderle (1770 pts). Bf 108 pilots were 12th (Werner Junck - 1733 pts), 13th (Theo Osterkamp - 1729 pts) and 15th (Karl Francke - 1715 pts).

== Maximum speed trial ==
The last part of the Challenge was a maximum speed trial, on a 297 km triangular course. The trial was carried out on Sunday, September 16, from 4 pm, at the Mokotowskie airfield in Warsaw.

Due to a handicapping system, contestants took off in order of general classification, with proper intervals, and a number of points given in the speed trial meant, that the first on the finishing line would be the winner of the contest. Each km/h above 210 km/h was awarded with one point.

The fastest were three German Bf 108s, with Theo Osterkamp at the lead (291 km/h). Next three places were taken by the Polish RWD-9s: Stanisław Płonczyński, Jan Buczyński, Jerzy Bajan and Henryk Skrzypiński, the later ex aequo with Hans Seidemann (Fi 97). The Pole Ignacy Giedgowd (PZL.26) and the Italian Ernesto Sanzin (Ba-39S) had to land due to engine faults and scored 0 points.

Maximum speed trial
	Pilot	Country	Aircraft	Speed	Points
1.	Theo Osterkamp	Nazi Germany	Bf 108A	291 km/h	81 pts
2.	Karl Francke	Nazi Germany	Bf 108A	287 km/h	77 pts
3.	Werner Junck	Nazi Germany	Bf 108A	283 km/h	73 pts
4.	Stanisław Płonczyński	Poland	RWD-9S	255 km/h	45 pts
5.	Jan Buczyński	Poland	RWD-9S	254 km/h	44 pts
6.	Jerzy Bajan	Poland	RWD-9S	251 km/h	41 pts
7/8.	Henryk Skrzypiński	Poland	RWD-9W	243 km/h	33 pts
7/8.	Hans Seidemann	Nazi Germany	Fieseler Fi 97	243 km/h	33 pts
9.	Piotr Dudziński	Poland	PZL.26	241 km/h	31 pts
10/11.	Gerhard Hubrich	Nazi Germany	Fieseler Fi 97	239 km/h	29 pts
10/11.	Georg Pasewaldt	Nazi Germany	Fieseler Fi 97	239 km/h	29 pts
12/14.	Wolf Hirth	Nazi Germany	Fieseler Fi 97	237 km/h	27 pts
12/14.	Ján Ambruš	Czechoslovakia	Aero A.200	237 km/h	27 pts
12/14.	Jan Anderle	Czechoslovakia	RWD-9W	237 km/h	27 pts
15.	Kurt Bayer	Nazi Germany	Fieseler Fi 97	236 km/h	26 pts
16.	Vojtěch Žáček	Czechoslovakia	Aero A.200	224 km/h	14 pts
17.	Armando François	Italy	PS-1	223 km/h	13 pts

Bf 108s managed to improve their positions, but first four places in general classification have not changed. The first contestants arrived in order: Bajan - Płonczyński - Seidemann - Ambruz - Osterkamp - Junck.

== Results ==
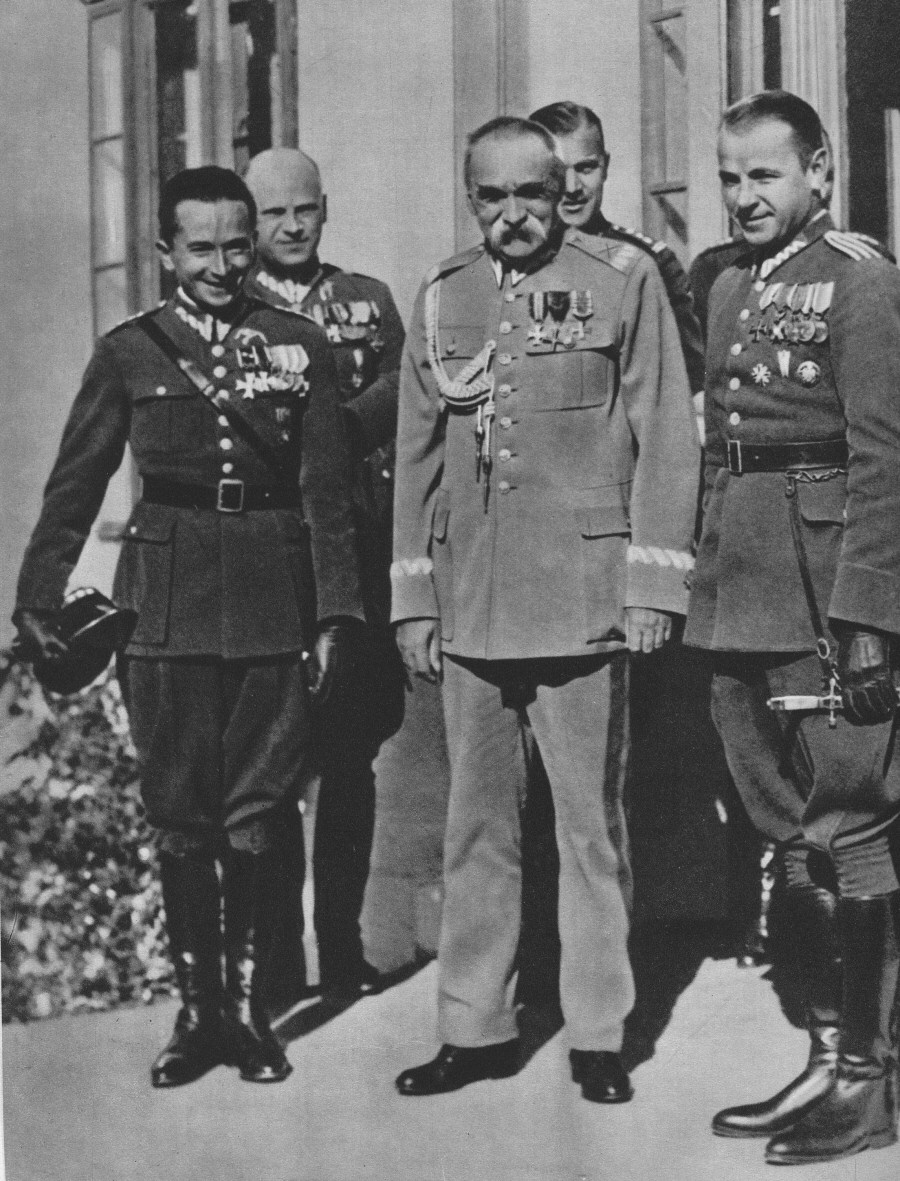
Polish aviators - winners of Challenge 1934: pilot Jerzy Bajan (left) and mechanic Gustaw Pokrzywka (right) with Marshal Józef Piłsudski (center).

A closing ceremony was held soon after the maximum speed test on September 16. The winners were the Polish crew of pilot Jerzy Bajan and mechanic Gustaw Pokrzywka. Their success was not only a result of their aviation skills, but also of the technical features of their Polish-designed RWD-9. Due to their victory, Poland had a right to organize the next Challenge in 1936, but it decided not to, because of financial reasons. The FAI proposed that other countries organize the contest, but Germany, Italy and France declined. The 1934 Challenge remained the last Challenge and the Polish Aero Club was given a right to retain a transitory cup.

Final Results
	Pilot	Country	Aircraft	Regn. / start No.	Points	Total
1.	Jerzy Bajan	Poland	RWD-9S	SP-DRD / 71	994 + 861 + 41	1896
2.	Stanisław Płonczyński	Poland	RWD-9S	SP-DRC / 75	953 + 868 + 45	1866
3.	Hans Seidemann	Nazi_Germany	Fieseler Fi 97	D-IPUS / 19	939 + 874 + 33	1846
4.	Ján Ambruš	Czechoslovakia	Aero A.200	OK-AMB / 52	915 + 880 + 27	1822
5.	Theo Osterkamp	Nazi_Germany	Bf 108A	D-IMUT / 14	854 + 875 + 81	1810
6.	Werner Junck	Nazi_Germany	Bf 108A	D-IJES / 16	895 + 838 + 73	1806
7.	Jan Buczyński	Poland	RWD-9S	SP-DRE / 72	920 + 836 + 44	1800
8.	Jan Anderle	Czechoslovakia	RWD-9W	OK-AMD / 54	915 + 855 + 27	1797
9.	Georg Pasewaldt	Nazi_Germany	Fieseler Fi 97	D-IDAH / 22	885 + 880 + 29	1794
10.	Karl Francke	Nazi_Germany	Bf 108A	D-IGAK / 15	899 + 816 + 77	1792
11.	Piotr Dudziński	Poland	PZL.26	SP-PZL / 61	875 + 880 + 31	1786
12.	Kurt Bayer	Nazi Germany	Fieseler Fi 97	D-IBYR / 18	902 + 854 + 26	1782
13.	Wolf Hirth	Nazi Germany	Fieseler Fi 97	D-IVIF / 17	915 + 819 + 27	1761
14.	Vojtěch Žaček	Czechoslovakia	Aero A.200	OK-AMA / 51	890 + 845 + 14	1749
15.	Henryk Skrzypiński	Poland	RWD-9W	SP-DRB / 76	883 + 826 + 33	1742
16.	Gerhard Hubrich	Nazi Germany	Fieseler Fi 97	D-IZUH / 21	936 + 763 + 29	1728
17.	Ignacy Giedgowd	Poland	PZL.26	SP-PZM / 62	839 + 880 + 0	1719
18.	Armando François	Italy	Pallavicino PS-1	I-FRAN / 42	801 + 747 + 13	1561
19.	Ernesto Sanzin	Italy	Breda Ba.39S	I-LUDO / 46	559 + 723 + 0	1282

== See also ==
- Challenge 1929
- Challenge 1930
- Challenge 1932
