= AS17 =

AS-17, AS.17 or As 17 may refer to:

- Airspeed AS.17, a British unbuilt licensed copy of the Fokker D.XVII biplane fighter
- Argus As 17, a German aircraft engine
- AS-17 Krypton, NATO reporting name for the Russian Kh-31 air-to-surface missile
- USS Nereus (AS-17), a United States Navy submarine tender
