= Aero A.200 =

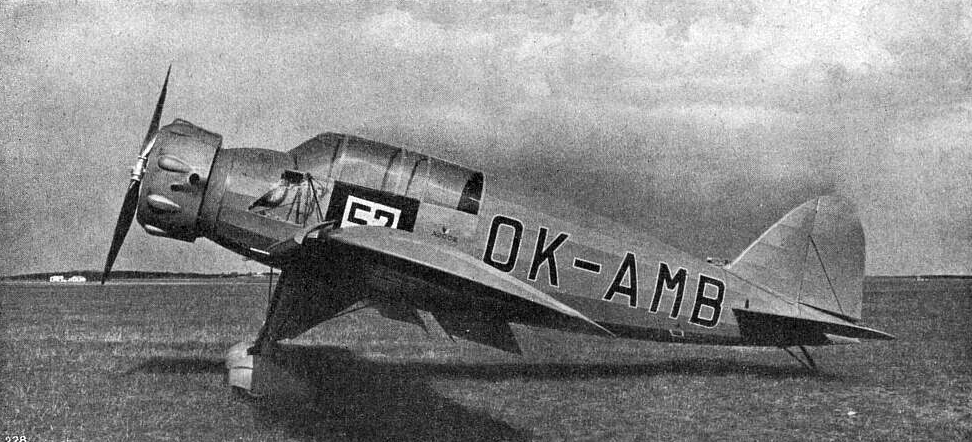

General information
- Type: Sportsplane
- Manufacturer: Aero Vodochody
- Primary user: Czechoslovakia
- Number built: 2

History
- Manufactured: 1934
- First flight: 1934

The Aero A.200 was a sportsplane of Czechoslovakia, designed and built specifically to compete in Challenge 1934, the European touring plane championships. It was a four-seater low-wing monoplane.

== Operational service ==
Flown in competition by Ján Ambruš, the A.200 took fourth place, beaten by the RWD-9 (that took both first and second places for Poland) and the Fieseler Fi 97 (from Germany). The other A.200, flown by Vojtěch Žaček, took the 14th place out of 34 competitors. They carried registrations OK-AMA and OK-AMB.

In a technical evaluation, A.200s ranked 4th among aircraft types taking part in the Challenge. They had the best short take-off capabilities in the contest – A.200s needed 74.5-77.6 m to take off and fly over 8-m high gate, although they needed some 118 m to land from above the gate.

== Description ==
Mixed construction low-wing monoplane, braced with wire. Fuselage of a steel frame, covered with wood and canvas, elliptical in cross-section. Rectangular wings of wooden construction, canvas covered, fitted with all-span slats and with flaps. Wings folded rearwards. The cabin had two seats side by side in front, with twin controls, and two seats in the rear, under a common multi-part canopy. Fixed landing gear with a rear skid. Radial engine in fuselage nose, with NACA cowling. Two-blade propeller.

== Specifications (A.200) ==
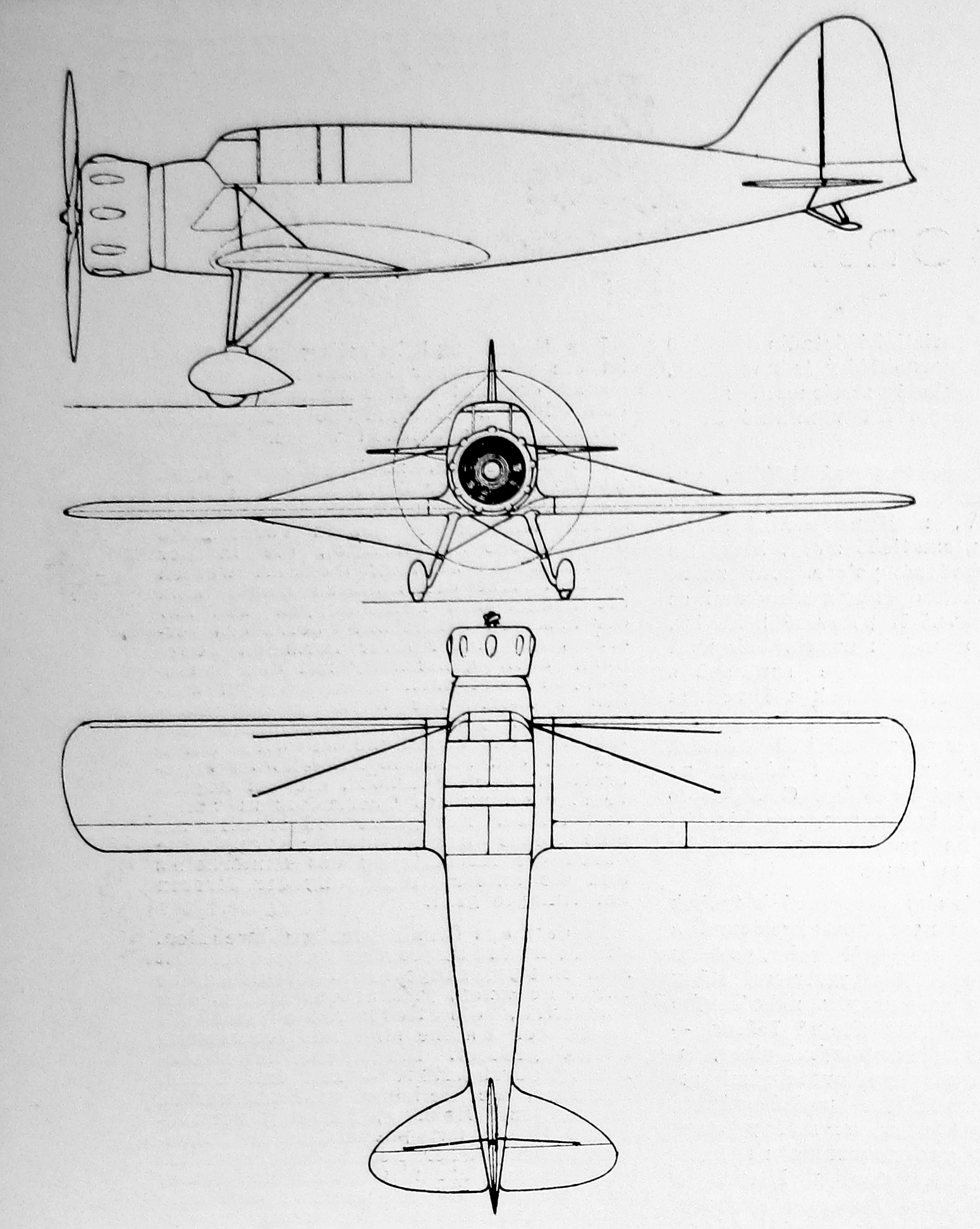
Aero A.200

Data from Monografie: Aero A-200

General characteristics

- Crew: 2
- Capacity: 2 passengers
- Length: 7.80 m (25 ft 7 in)
- Wingspan: 11.10 m (36 ft 5 in)
- Height: 2.42 m (7 ft 11 in)
- Wing area: 16.60 m^{2} (178.7 sq ft)
- Empty weight: 560 kg (1,235 lb)
- Gross weight: 950 kg (2,094 lb)
- Powerplant: 1 × Walter Bora 9-cyl. air-cooled radial piston engine, 147 kW (197 hp)

Performance

- Maximum speed: 255 km/h (158 mph, 138 kn)
- Cruise speed: 238 km/h (148 mph, 129 kn)
- Stall speed: 54 km/h (34 mph, 29 kn) with slops and flaps
- Range: 800 km (500 mi, 430 nmi)
- Service ceiling: 8,300 m (27,200 ft)
- Rate of climb: 1.5 m/s (300 ft/min)
- Wing loading: 57.2 kg/m^{2} (11.7 lb/sq ft)
- Take-off distance: 30 m (98 ft)
- Landing distance: 50 m (160 ft)

== See also ==
Aircraft of comparable role, configuration, and era

- Fieseler Fi 97
- Breda Ba.42
