= Caproni PS.1 =

Plane model

PS.1
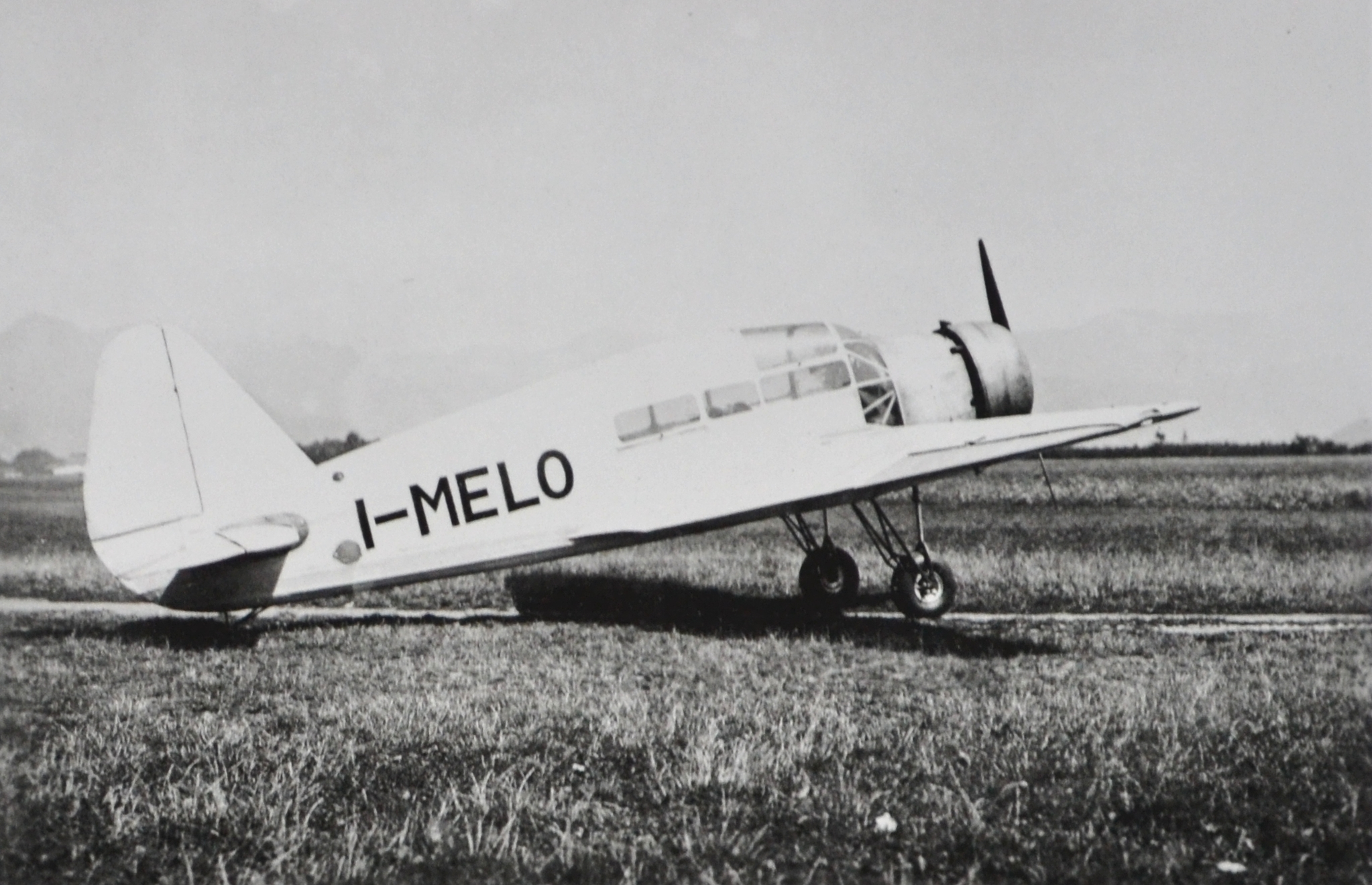
- The second PS.1

General information
- Type: Sportsplane
- Manufacturer: Caproni
- Primary user: Italy
- Number built: 2

History
- Manufactured: 1934
- First flight: 1934

The Caproni PS.1, also known as the Pallavicino PS-1 and Caproni Ca.303, was an Italian four-seater sportsplane, designed and built specifically to compete in Challenge 1934, the European touring plane championships.

== Design and development ==
The PS.1 was designed by Cesare Pallavicino, the former designer of Breda, after he had moved in 1933 to Caproni. Only two prototypes of the PS.1 were built, given registrations I-FRAN and I-MELO.

== Description ==
The Caproni PS.1 was a four-seat cabin aircraft of metal construction, with cantilever monoplane low wings. The steel-framed fuselage was covered with fabric as were the single-sparred trapezoidal planform foldable wings of steel construction which had rounded tips. The cabin had two side-by-side seats in front with dual controls, and two seats in the rear, under a common multi-part canopy. A retractable conventional landing gear with a rear skid was fitted with the mainwheels protruding from the wing's lower surface when retracted. The radial engine was fitted to the fuselage nose, enclosed by a cowling, driving a two-bladed propeller. Fuel was housed in a 160-litre fuel tank.

== Operational history ==
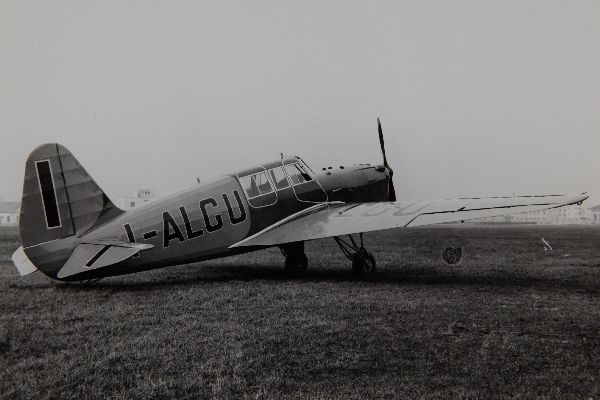
The second PS.1 after reconstruction as the Caproni Ca.166

Both aircraft took part in the Challenge 1934 contest, flown by Armando François and Ugo Vincenzi. In a technical evaluation, the PS-1 took second place behind the Messerschmitt Bf 108 (the PS-1 and Bf 108 were the only Challenge aircraft with retractable landing gear). The aircraft were completed only shortly before the contest, so their pilots had little time for training. During a short landing trial, Vincenzi damaged his engine and propeller, and he had to withdraw. Armando François completed the contest in 18th place (for 34 starting and 19 finishing crews).

The second PS.1, I-MELO, was rebuilt in the late 1930s and redesignated Caproni Ca.166, given the registration I-ALGU.

== Specifications (PS.1) ==
Data from

General characteristics

- Crew: one or two
- Capacity: two to three passengers
- Length: 7.19 m (23 ft 7 in)
- Wingspan: 10.41 m (34 ft 1.875 in)
- Height: 2.1 m (7 ft)
- Wing area: 17.54 m^{2} (188.8 sq ft)
- Empty weight: 659 kg (1,452 lb)
- Gross weight: 1,078 kg (2,376 lb)
- Fuel capacity: 160 L (35 imp gal; 42 US gal)
- Powerplant: 1 × Fiat A.70 air-cooled 7-cylinder radial engine, 147 kW (197 hp)

Performance

- Maximum speed: 261 km/h (162 mph, 141 kn)
- Cruise speed: 230 km/h (143 mph, 124 kn)
- Stall speed: 60 km/h (37 mph, 32 kn)
- Range: 800 km (500 mi, 430 nmi)
- Service ceiling: 6,500 m (21,320 ft)
- Time to altitude: 26 minutes to 4,000 m (13,120 ft)
- Wing loading: 60 kg/m^{2} (12 lb/sq ft)
- Power/mass: 0.14 kW/kg (0.087 hp/lb)

== See also ==
Aircraft of comparable role, configuration, and era

- Aero A.200
- Fieseler Fi 97
- Messerschmitt Bf 108
