= Tatra T.101 =

T.101
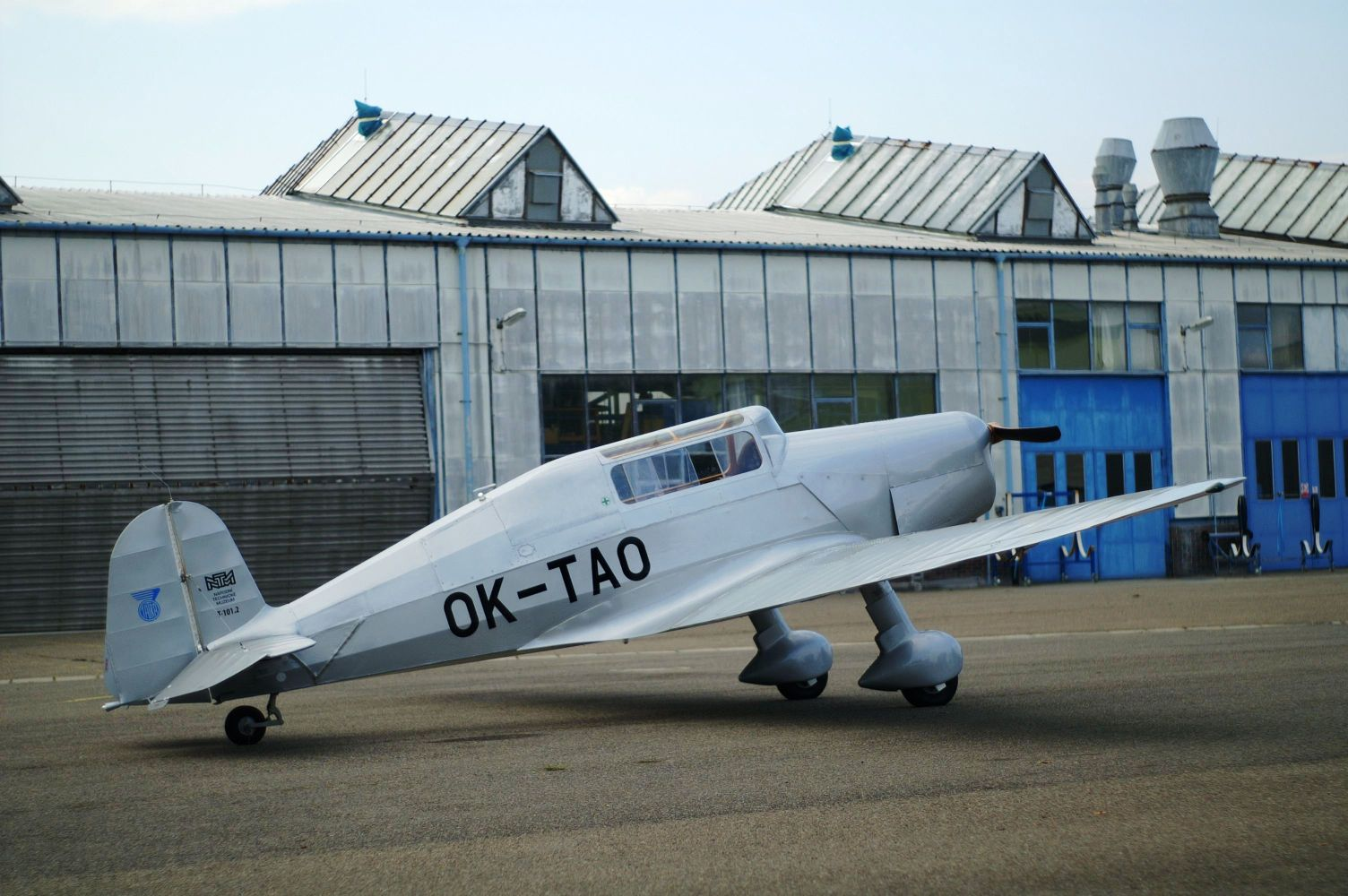
- OK-TAO, the 2008 replica aircraft that carries the registration of the original.

General information
- Type: General aviation
- National origin: Czechoslovakia (original); Czech Republic (replica)
- Manufacturer: Ringhoffer-Tatra (original); Ivo and Jiří Sklenář (replica)
- Status: Replica active.
- Primary user: Jan Ambruš (original); Ivo and Jiří Sklenář (replica)
- Number built: 2

History
- Manufactured: 1937 (original); 2008 (replica)
- First flight: 1937 (original); October 2009 (replica)
- Developed from: Tatra T.001

The Tatra T.101 is a two-seat monoplane general aviation aircraft that was built in 1937 by Ringhoffer-Tatra. Only one aircraft was built, but it set several records in the hands of Jan Ambruš. In 2008 a replica aircraft was constructed by brothers Ivo and Jiří Sklenář. It first flew in October 2009.

== Design and development ==
Ringhoffer-Tatra started making aircraft in 1935, building the Avro 626 Avian and Bücker Bü 131 Jungmann under licence. In 1937 the Tatra T.001 was the first aircraft designed and built by Tatra. The T.101 was a development of that aircraft, with an increased wingspan and a larger empennage than the T.001.

Only one aircraft was built by Ringhoffer-Tatra, msn 01. It was registered OK-TAO.

== Operational history ==
The Tatra T.101 gained a number of records. In 1937 a prize was offered for the longest flight by an aircraft of Czechoslovak origin. In 1938 Jan Ambruš and Vojtěch Matěna flew from Ruzyně Airport, Prague to Khartoum Airport, Sudan, a distance of 2,340 nautical miles (4,330 km). The aircraft achieved a height record of 7,113 metres (23,337 ft) in the category for two-seat aircraft with an engine capacity of less than 4 litres (240 cu in). This was later raised to 7,470 metres (24,510 ft).

== Replica ==
After the Velvet Revolution of 1989, citizens in the Czech Republic and Slovakia gained new freedom. The celebration of heritage had been suppressed under communism and the restoration of historic aircraft was forbidden by the Communist authorities. Since the revolution, interest in heritage has grown, and a number of attempts to revive industrial heritage, including aviation heritage, have been successful.

One of these projects was the re-creation of the Tatra T.101 by twins Ivo and Jiří Sklenář. In the early 2000s they started researching the aircraft and discovered that the blueprints had escaped destruction. They were discovered in the state archive at Opava. A Tatra HM-504 and a Tatra T100 engine were acquired with the assistance of Tatra and the Czech Aeronautical Research and Testing Institute. These two engines were rebuilt and made into an airworthy T100 engine with the assistance of Tatra and the Czech National Technical Museum.

The process was hampered by the non-availability of spare parts, particularly cylinder valves. A new two-bladed wooden propeller was one of the first items made for the aircraft. The replica used some modern manufacturing methods and materials, such as TIG welding, carbon composites and fibreglass. Deviations from the original design were made only where required by modern aeronautical regulations. The aircraft has modern avionics and a strobe light.

The 13.00 metres (42 ft 8 in) span wooden wings are a one-piece unit. They were built by Jan Tobek, an ultralight aircraft maker. The wing is the largest wooden wing built in the Czech Republic since the end of World War II. The aircraft was assembled at Kunovice Airport in a hangar owned by Evektor-Aerotechnik and Let Kunovice. The aircraft was completed on 29 September 2008. After ground testing, a series of flight tests was begun in October 2009, resulting in the issue of a Certificate of Airworthiness on 1 December 2009. The replica aircraft was given msn 02.

== Specifications ==
Data from Rekordní Tatra T-101

General characteristics

- Crew: 2
- Length: 6.62 m (21 ft 9 in)
- Wingspan: 13.00 m (42 ft 8 in)
- Height: 2.15 m (7 ft 1 in)
- Wing area: 16.4 m^{2} (177 sq ft)
- Airfoil: NACA 23016 (modified) (root), NACA 23008 (modified) (tip)
- Empty weight: 500 kg (1,102 lb)
- Max takeoff weight: 1,100 kg (2,425 lb)
- Powerplant: 1 × Tatra T100 4-cylinder air-cooled inverted in-line piston engine, 77 kW (103 hp)
- Propellers: 2-bladed fixed-pitch propeller

Performance

- Maximum speed: 215 km/h (134 mph, 116 kn)
- Cruise speed: 190 km/h (120 mph, 100 kn)
- Range: 1,200 km (750 mi, 650 nmi)
- Service ceiling: 750 m (2,460 ft)

== See also ==
- Tatra T.001, which the T.101 was developed from.
- Tatra T.201, which was developed from the T.101
- Zlin 26, which was developed from the T.201
