= Argus As 17 =

1930s German piston aircraft engine

As.17
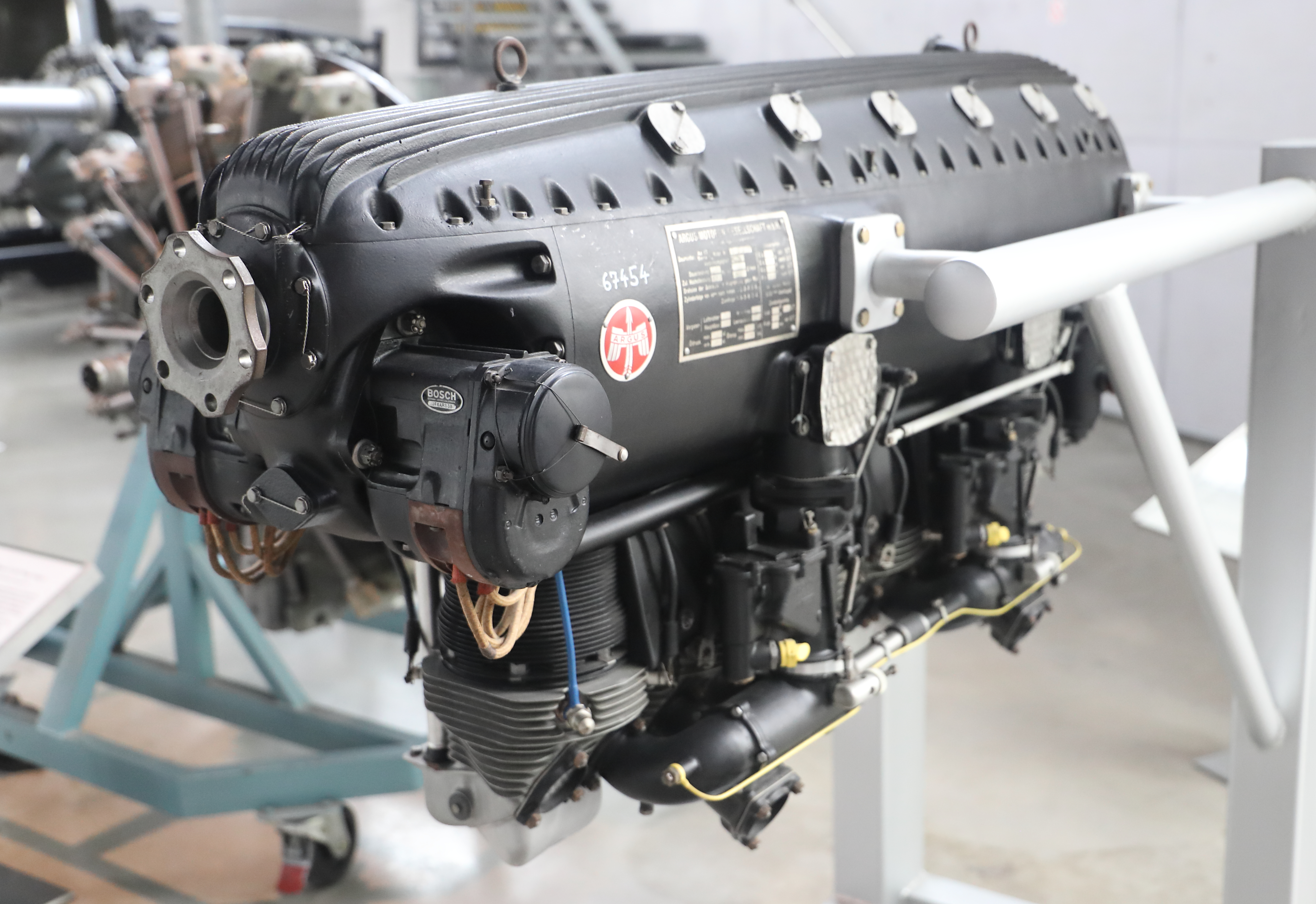
- An Argus As 17A at the Deutsches Museum Flugwerft Schleissheim
- Type: Air cooled inline 6 aircraft engine
- National origin: Germany
- Manufacturer: Argus

The Argus As 17 was an air cooled six-cylinder in-line aircraft engine designed by the German engineering company Argus Motoren in the 1930s. Developed from the same company's smaller As 8, the engine was produced in ratings between 200 and 280 hp (149 and 209 kW). First demonstrated in 1934, it powered a number of competitors at the Challenge International de Tourisme that year, including the Messerschmitt Bf 108. Argus produced it in small numbers as German manufacturers like Messerschmitt preferring V-8 alternatives for their aircraft.

== Design and development ==
The Argus As 17 was an inverted six cylinder aircraft engine in the 200 horsepower (149 kW) class that was first demonstrated in 1934. It was a development of the company's As 8 four-cylinder engine. The engine had cast aluminium heads and aluminium pistons mounted in steel cylinders and connected to a chrome-nickel steel crankshaft. Bore was 120 millimetres (4.7 in) and stroke 130 mm (5.1 in).

It was used to power a small number of German aircraft in the late 1930s, notably three entries to the Challenge International de Tourisme 1934, the Fieseler Fi 97, Klemm Kl 36 and Messerschmitt Bf 108. Each aircraft was entered in two variants, one powered by the Argus engine and other with the more powerful Hirth HM 8U V-8. The engine was developed in three versions. The lower powered As 17A, which was used to power the fourth prototype Bf 108, was rated at 200 hp. A more developed engine, the As 17B, rated at 220 hp (164 kW), was used to power the seventh Bf 108A prototype. The more powerful As 17 Special was also produced, which differed in having a supercharger that increased rated power to 280 hp (209 kW).

The engine was produced in small numbers, never achieving serial production. Only two of the Fieseler aircraft were fitted with the engine. Klemm preferred the Hm 8U for the definitive Kl 36B. Production examples of the Bf 108 used either the HM 8U or Argus's own V-8, the As 10, the latter becoming the standard for the BF 108B.

== Variants ==
As 17A
200 hp (149 kW)
As 17B
220 hp (164 kW)
As 17 Special
280 hp (209 kW)

== Applications ==
- Fieseler Fi 97
- Klemm Kl 36A
- Messerschmitt Bf 108A

== Specifications (As 17A) ==
Data from Schneider 1936

=== General characteristics ===
- Type: 6-cylinder air cooled inverted in-line aircraft piston engine
- Bore: 120 mm (4.7 in)
- Stroke: 130 mm (5.1 in)
- Displacement: 8.82 L (538 in^{3})
- Length: 1,411 mm (55.6 in)
- Width: 485 mm (19.1 in)
- Height: 753 mm (29.6 in)
- Dry weight: 174 kg (384 lb)

=== Components ===
- Valvetrain: Two valves per cylinder
- Fuel type: Gasoline
- Cooling system: Air-cooled

=== Performance ===
- Power output:
  - (Cruise) 200 hp (149 kW) at 2300 rpm
  - (Peak) 225 hp (168 kW) at 2400 rpm for 120 minutes
- Specific power: 16.6 kW/L (0.37 hp/in^{3})
- Compression ratio: 6.3:1
- Fuel consumption: 306 g/(kW•h) (0.50 lb/(hp•h))
- Power-to-weight ratio: 0.91 kW/kg (0.51 hp/lb)

== See also ==
Comparable engines

- Alfa Romeo 115
- de Havilland Gipsy Six
- Isotta Fraschini Beta
- Menasco Buccaneer

Related lists

- List of aircraft engines
