= RWD 9 =

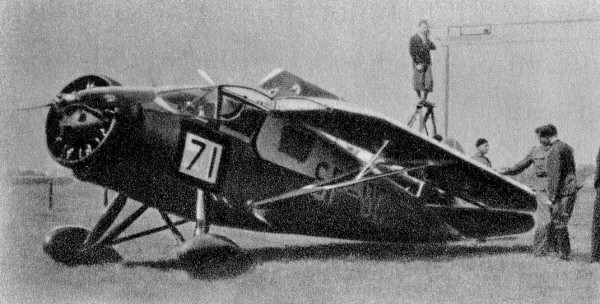
- An RWD 9 during the wing folding contest at the 1934 Challenge.

General information
- Type: Sport Aircraft
- Manufacturer: DWL
- Designer: Stanisław Rogalski and Jerzy Drzewiecki
- Primary users: Polish civilian aviation Czechoslovakia, Spain, France
- Number built: 1 static test, 1 prototype, 8 production

History
- Manufactured: 1933-1934
- Introduction date: 1934
- First flight: 4 December 1933

The RWD 9 was a Polish sports plane of 1934, constructed by the RWD team.

== Development ==
The aircraft was a further development of the RWD 6 - the winner of the IIIrd Challenge de Tourisme International Challenge 1932 international tourist aircraft contest. The RWD-9 was designed specially for the purpose of competing in the IVth Challenge de Tourisme International to be held in Warsaw during August–September 1934 . It was constructed by Stanisław Rogalski and Jerzy Drzewiecki of the RWD team in the DWL workshops in Warsaw. To meet new contest regulations, the new plane was designed as four-seater, with increased mass and engine power and yet better STOL capabilities.

The first prototype was completed in October 1933, with a 265 hp Menasco inline engine, and first flew on December 4, 1933. In January 1934 it was fitted with Czech Walter Bora radial engine (220 hp), and in spring 1934 with newly constructed Polish radial engine GR-760 (290 hp), created by Stanisław Nowkuński. In 1934 there were built 8 RWD 9s: 4 RWD 9W with Walter Bora engine (registrations: SP-DRA, SP-DRB, OK-AMC, OK-AMD) and 4 RWD 9S with GR-760 engine (registrations: SP-DRC, -DRD, -DRE, -DRF). RWD-9W had worse performance, comparing to RWD-9S (maximum speed 260 to 281 km/h).#

== RWD 20 ==
For research into Tricycle undercarriages D.W.L. converted the prototype RWD 9 to the RWD 20 fitting a 130 hp Walter Major engine, steerable noseleg, moving the main undercarriage legs rearwards, and removing the rear seats door and windows which were faired over with plywood. Extensive testing was carried out with take-offs, landings and taxiing on different surfaces including unprepared fields as well as ploughed land. Conversion was completed in 1938 and the flight trials proved the stability and manoeuvrability of the tri-cycle undercarriage during extensive taxiing trials, (landings and take-offs were carried out with the nosewheel steering locked). The fate of the RWD 20 is unknown but it did not survive WWII.

== Usage ==
Six RWD 9s were used by the Polish Challenge team, while the remaining two were ordered by the Czechoslovak team (OK-AMC, -AMD). The Czechoslovak OK-AMC was crashed during trainings, and had not been repaired before the contest.

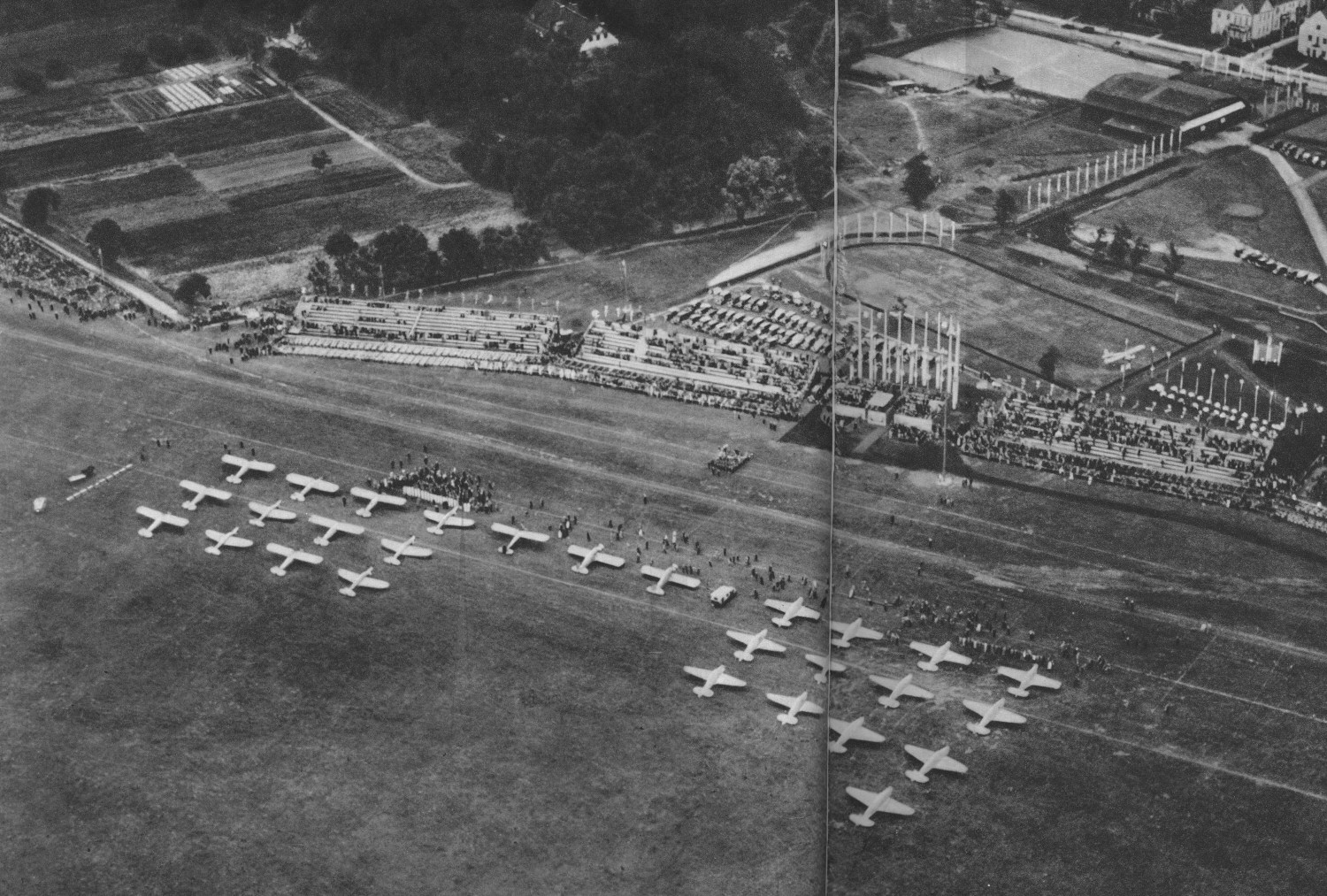
The opening ceremony, from the left: Polish team, three-aircraft Czechoslovak team, German team. The Italian team had not arrived yet.

In the Challenge 1934, held between August 28-September 16, 1934, Polish RWD 9S took the first (pilot Jerzy Bajan, SP-DRD) and second places (pilot Stanisław Płonczyński, SP-DRC). They won among others against German low-wing monoplanes Messerschmitt Bf 108 and Fieseler Fi 97. Polish RWD 9 took also the 7th and 15th places, and the Czechoslovak OK-AMD took the 8th place (pilot Jan Anderle).

After the Challenge, RWD 9 were used by the sporting aviation. In 1935 two of them (SP-DRA, -DRB) were sold to Spain, and the third SP-DRE to French institute CEMA (Centre d'Essais de Matériels Aériens, Aerial Equipments Test Center), in Villacoublay (markings: F-AKHE). On July 16, 1936, RWD 9 SP-DRC crashed to the Baltic Sea due to low flying, killing crew, with Polish General Gustaw Orlicz-Dreszer aboard. The remaining two Polish RWD 9s were used in Polish Aero Club (SP-DRF was crashed later).

The Spanish aircraft were used as liaison aircraft on the Republican side during the Spanish Civil War.

== Description ==
The RWD 9 was a four-seat sports and touring strutted high-wing monoplane of mixed construction. It had a metal frame fuselage covered with canvas on a wooden frame, in engine section with aluminium sheets. Two-spar rectangular wing of wooden construction, canvas and plywood covered, were fitted. The wings were folded rearwards, and were equipped with automatic slats, flaps and interceptors. The cabin was enclosed with four places in two rows, with two doors, and the cockpit fitted with double controls for pilot and co-pilot. The RWD 9 had a twin-blade wooden propeller with a fixed pitch. Conventional fixed landing gear, with a rear skid. Fuel tanks were housed in the wings and fuselage - 160 L. Take-off: 76.1 m (to altitude 8 m), landing: 76.9 m (from altitude 8 m - best results from the Challenge contest).

== Military operators ==
Spain

- Spanish Republican Air Force

Spain

- Spanish Air Force - Post civil war.

== Specifications (RWD 9S) ==
Data from Polish aircraft 1893-1939

General characteristics

- Crew: 2 (pilot & mechanic)
- Capacity: 2 passengers
- Length: 7.6 m (24 ft 11 in)
- Wingspan: 11.64 m (38 ft 2 in)
- Height: 2 m (6 ft 7 in)
- Wing area: 16 m^{2} (170 sq ft)
- Airfoil: IAW-192 (PZL-DJ3)
- Empty weight: 560 kg (1,235 lb)
- Gross weight: 930 kg (2,050 lb)
- Powerplant: 1 × Polish-Skoda Works GR.760 9-cylinder air-cooled radial piston engine, 190–210 kW (260–280 hp) (geared and supercharged)
- Propellers: 2-bladed Szomański fixed pitch, Heddernheimer RS adjustable-pitch, or Letov adjustable-pitch propeller

Performance

- Maximum speed: 280 km/h (170 mph, 150 kn)
- Cruise speed: 245 km/h (152 mph, 132 kn)
- Minimum speed: 55 km/h (34 mph; 30 kn)
- Range: 800 km (500 mi, 430 nmi)
- Ferry range: 2,500 km (1,600 mi, 1,300 nmi) with ferry tanks
- Service ceiling: 7,000 m (23,000 ft)
- Time to altitude: 2 minutes 10 seconds to 1,000 m (3,300 ft)
- Wing loading: 58 kg/m^{2} (12 lb/sq ft)
- Power/mass: 0.21 kW/kg (0.13 hp/lb)
- Take-off run to 8 m (26 ft): 76 m (249 ft)
- Landing run from 8 m (26 ft): 77 m (253 ft)

== See also ==
Related development

- RWD 6
- RWD 13
- RWD 15

Aircraft of comparable role, configuration, and era

- Aero A.200

Related lists

- List of interwar military aircraft
- List of aircraft of the Spanish Republican Air Force
