= Jerzy Bajan =

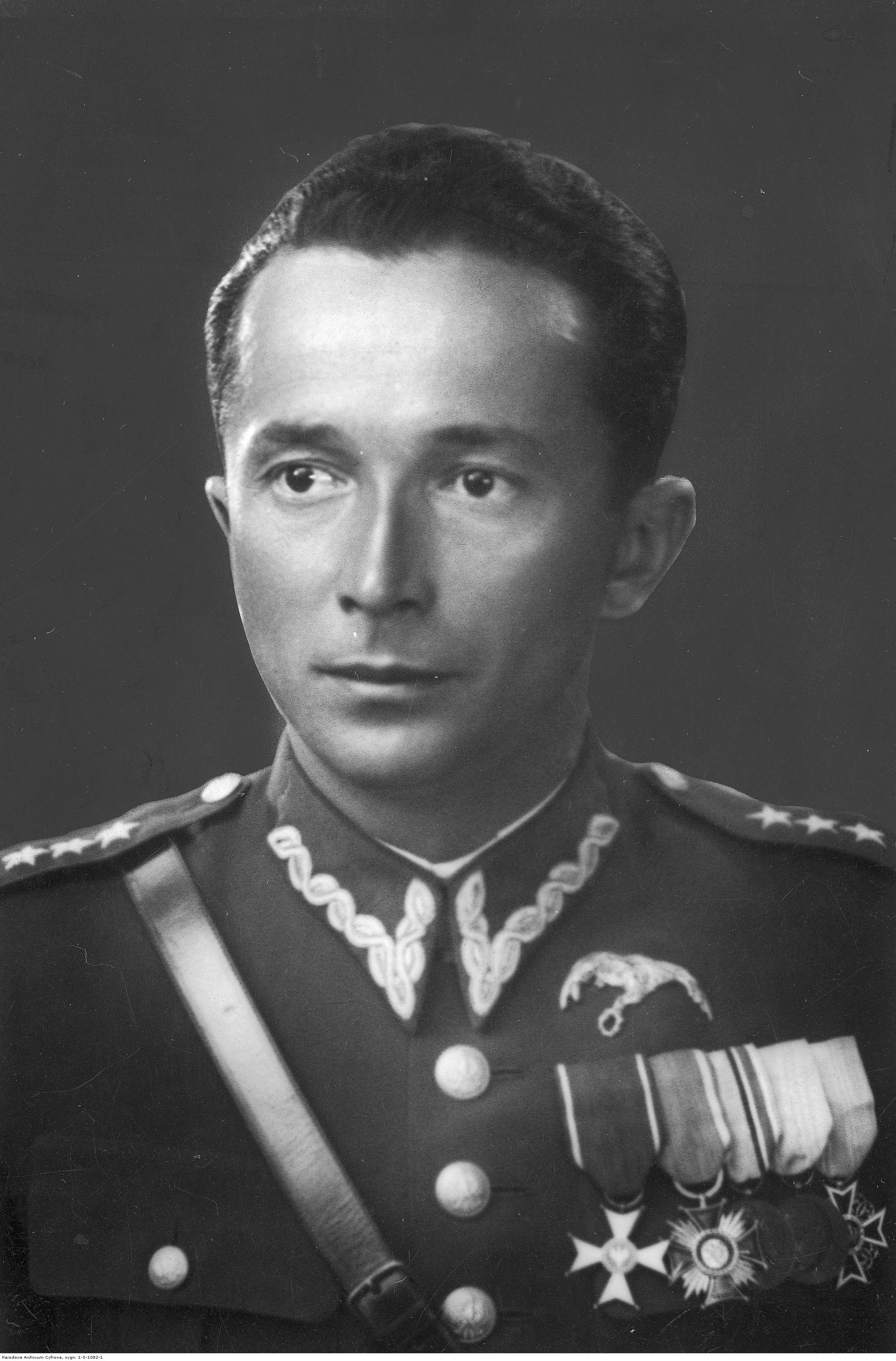
- Born: 4 June 1901; Lemberg, Austria-Hungary
- Died: 27 June 1967 (aged 66); London, England
- Burial place: Northwood Cemetery, London, England
- Military career
- Allegiance: Poland; United Kingdom
- Branch: Polish Air Force; Royal Air Force
- Service years: 1918-1945
- Rank: Colonel Pilot
- Units: 122nd Fighter Escadrille; No. 316 Squadron RAF
- Conflicts: Polish–Ukrainian War; Polish–Soviet War; World War II

Jerzy Bajan (4 May 1901 – 27 June 1967) was a prominent Polish sports and military aviator, winner of the Challenge 1934 contest.

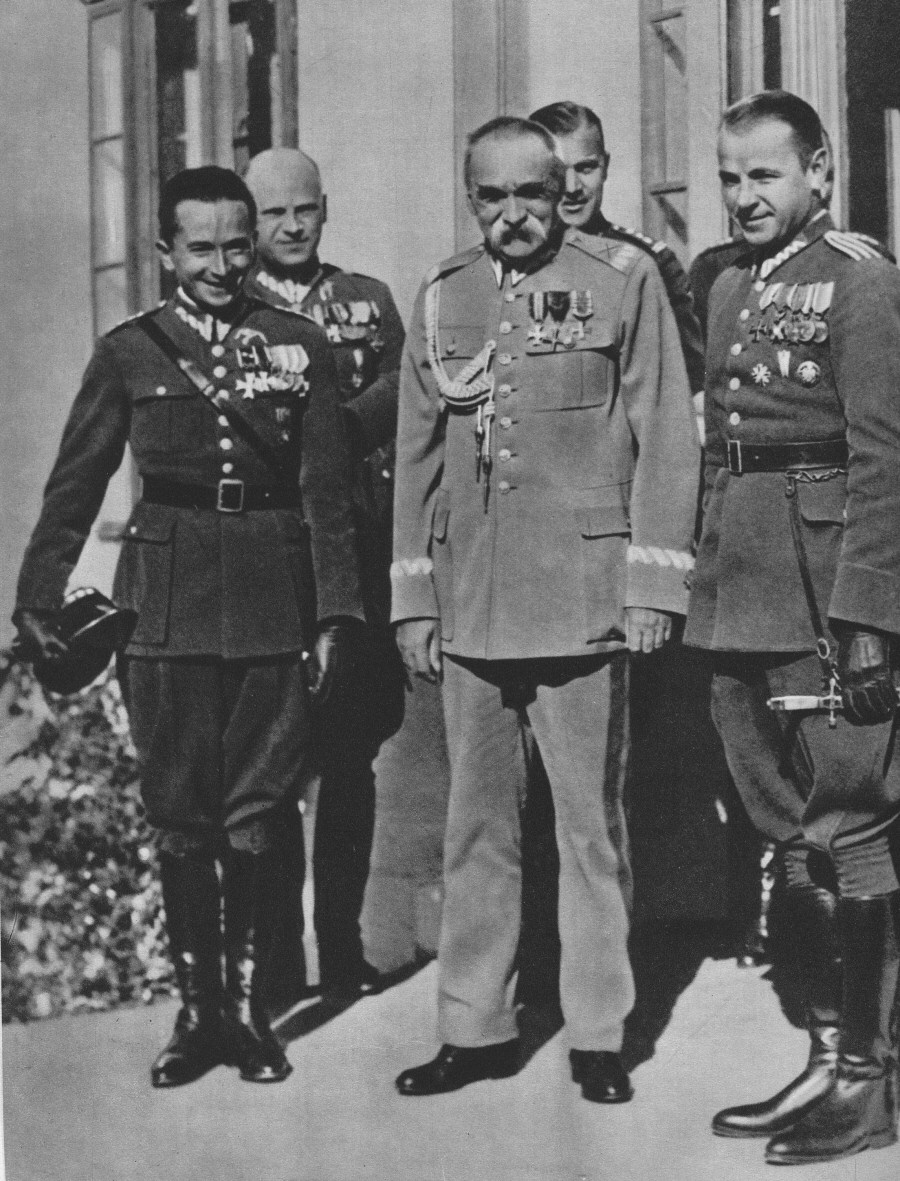
Bajan (left) with Marshal Józef Piłsudski (centre) and Gustaw Pokrzywka (right) after Challenge in 1934

== Early military career ==
He was born in Lemberg, Austria-Hungary (Polish: Lwów; now Lviv, Ukraine). After Poland regained independence in 1918, at the age of 17 he volunteered for the Polish Army. He was one of young Lwów defenders ("Lwów Eaglets"). Next he served in cavalry, and later in infantry, during the Polish-Soviet war of 1920. In 1922, he applied for the Polish Air Force.

Despite experiencing health problems, he completed the Officer Flying School in Grudziądz and a higher pilotage course in Bydgoszcz and became a fighter pilot. In 1927, he served in 114th Fighter Escadre in Lida, from 1928 moved to Kraków and renamed the 122nd Fighter Escadre of the 2nd Fighter Regiment. In the beginning of the 1930s he was promoted to Captain.

== Sport activities ==
During service in a fighter unit, his passion became aerobatics. Along with Karol Pniak and Corporal Macek he formed the first aerobatic team in Poland, so-called "Bajan's trio". They flew on air shows on PWS-A fighters, the wings of which were tied together by ropes.

Bajan also took part in aviation contests. In July–August 1930 he took part in International Touring Aircraft Contest, the Challenge 1930, flying the RWD-4, with his escadre's chief mechanic Gustaw Pokrzywka as a crewman. He completed it on far 32nd place, but completing the contest was a success itself (for 60 starting crews). In 1931 Bajan won an aerobatic contest during an air meeting in Zagreb. Between 22 and 31 July 1932 he took part in the 3rd International Air Meeting in Zurich (or "Alpen rally"), flying a prototype fighter PZL P.11, and he came second (the first place of the Yugoslavian pilot was debated, because of using additions for fuel).

In 12–28 August 1932 Bajan took part in another Challenge 1932 contest, flying the PZL.19, again with Pokrzywka, and completed on 11th place (for 43 starting crews). In May 1933 they took part in a rally to Vienna, for the 1st Alpen Flight Contest, covering in two stages 4063 km Warsaw-Kharkov-Leningrad-Lwów-Vienna route and winning the 1st place in a rally. During the contest itself, their PZL.19 was thrown by a wind to the trees while taking off from Baltant near Treibach, and then burnt; Bajan and Pokrzywka bailed out successfully.

In the last International Touring Aircraft Contest, the Challenge 1934, set up between 28 August and 19 September 1934 in Warsaw, Bajan came as a winner, flying RWD-9 with Gustaw Pokrzywka as a crewman. Therefore, he became one of the most popular aviators in Poland.

== Later military career ==
In the second part of the 1930s, Bajan was promoted to Major. After a practice in Great Britain, he became a Chief of Training in a Higher Flying School in Grudziądz. In 1936-1938 he studied at Higher War School in Warsaw, which he graduated. On 15 June 1939, in a rank of Colonel, he became a chief of Flying Cadet School in Flying Officer Training Centre in Dęblin.

== World War II and post-war ==
After outbreak of World War II, Bajan was injured in the left hand during a Luftwaffe bombing raid on Dęblin on 2 September 1939, and his hand became disabled. Along with other Polish pilots, he escaped to France in 1940, then to Great Britain. He occupied staff positions in the Polish Air Force in exile, but he also occasionally flew aircraft, having attached a hook to his hand. He served initially in a Polish Air Force Inspectorate. From 7 April to 17 October 1941 he was the first Polish liaison officer in Royal Air Force Training Command (a chief of the Polish training aviation in Great Britain). In 1942, he took part in several combat flights in No. 316 Polish Fighter Squadron. From 1 June 1943, after the death of Stefan Pawlikowski, he became a Polish liaison officer in RAF Fighter Command - a chief of the Polish fighter aviation. Promoted to Colonel, he occupied this position until post-war, when it was liquidated.

After the war he stayed in London instead of returning to a communist-ruled country. Bajan actively worked in the Polish Aviators Association in Great Britain, serving as its president for a time. He led the historical commission, that researched a list of Polish air victories during World War II, known as the "Bajan's list". He also was a co-founder of the Polish Gliding Club at Lasham. He received disability benefits. Bajan died on 27 June 1967 in London.

== Awards and decorations ==
- Commander's Cross of the Order of Polonia Restituta (posthumously, 1968)
- Officer's Cross of the Order of Polonia Restituta (16 September 1936)
- Knight's Cross of the Order of Polonia Restituta (9 November 1932)
- Cross of Valour (twice)
- Air Medal (four times)
- Gold Cross of Merit
- Medal of Independence (22 April 1938)
- Silver Cross of Merit (10 November 1928)
- Commemorative Medal for the War of 1918–1921
- Medal of the 10th Anniversary of Regained Independence
- Gold Badge of Airborne and Antigas Defence League (17 September 1934)
- Wound Decoration
- Knight of the Order of the Crown of Romania (Romania)
- Knight 1st Class of the Order of the Sword (Sweden, 1936)
- Silver Cross of the Order of Saint Alexander (Bulgaria, 1938)
