= Hans Seidemann =

German general (1901–1967)

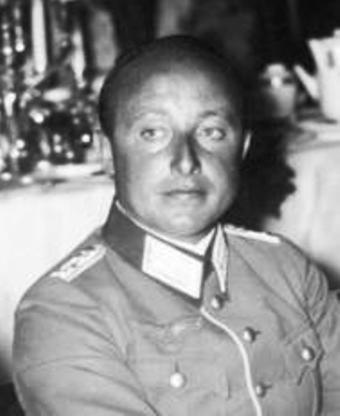
- Born: 18 January 1901; Garlin, Province of Brandenburg, Kingdom of Prussia, German Empire
- Died: 21 December 1967 (aged 66); Braunschweig, Lower Saxony, West Germany
- Military career
- Allegiance: Weimar Republic; Nazi Germany
- Branch: Luftwaffe
- Service years: 1919–1945
- Rank: General der Flieger
- Commands: 8th Air Corps
- Conflicts: World War II; Battle of Prokhorovka
- Awards: Knight's Cross of the Iron Cross with Oak Leaves

Hans Seidemann (18 January 1901 – 21 December 1967) was a German general during World War II. He was a recipient of the Knight's Cross of the Iron Cross with Oak Leaves of Nazi Germany.

From April 1928 to October 1929, Seidemann was trained as a Luftwaffe pilot at the secret training facility in Lipetsk, Soviet Union. He also participated in the third and fourth FAI International Tourist Plane Contest Challenge 1932 (7th place) and Challenge 1934 (3rd place).

By the mid 1930s Seidemann was a renowned air racer and won the 1937 London - Isle of Man Air Race.

== Awards ==
- Spanish Cross in Gold with Swords (6 June 1939)
- Iron Cross (1939) 2nd Class (25 September 1939) & 1st Class (20 May 1940)
- Knight's Cross of the Iron Cross with Oak Leaves
  - Knight's Cross on 20 March 1942 as Oberst im Generalstab and chief of the general staff of Luftflotte 2
  - 658th Oak Leaves on 18 November 1944 as Generalleutnant and commanding general of VIII. Fliegerkorps

Military offices
| Preceded by General Otto Hoffmann von Waldau | Commander of Fliegerführer Afrika; 30 August 1942 – 1 February 1943 | Succeeded by Generalmajor Walter Hagen |
| Preceded by General der Flieger Martin Fiebig | Commander of VIII. Fliegerkorps; 21 May 1943 – 8 May 1945 | Succeeded by none |
