= Jan Ambrus =

Ján Ambruš
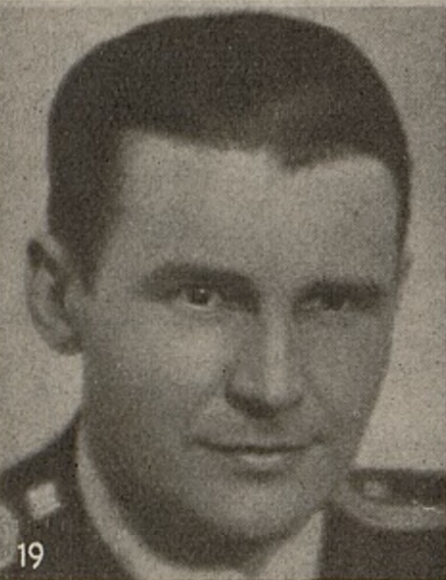
- Born: 19 May 1899; Gorna Mitropolia, Bulgaria
- Died: 2 January 1994 (aged 94); Chicago, Illinois, USA
- Burial place: Slávičie údolie cemetery, Bratislava
- Military career
- Allegiance: Austria-Hungary; Czechoslovakia; France; United Kingdom; Czechoslovakia
- Branch: Royal Hungarian Honvéd Czechoslovak Army; Czechoslovak Air Force; French Air Force; Royal Air Force Czechoslovak Air Force
- Service years: 1918–48
- Rank: Brigadier-General
- Service number: 81883 (RAF)
- Units: No. 310 Squadron RAF; No. 312 Squadron RAF
- Commands: No. 312 Squadron RAF
- Conflicts: Second World War; Battle of France; Battle of Britain
- Awards: Milan Rastislav Stefanik Order, 3rd class Czechoslovak War Cross; Československá medaile Za chrabrost před nepřítelem Československá medaile za zásluhy, 1st Class; Pamětní medaile československé armády v zahraničí Officer of the Order of the British Empire; 1939–1945 Star with Battle of Britain clasp Defence Medal; War Medal 1939–1945 Order of the Crown, 5th Class
- Other work: design engineer

Ján Ambruš, OBE (19 May 1899 – 2 January 1994) was a Slovak aerobatics and fighter pilot. He flew with the French Air Force in the Battle of France and the Royal Air Force in the Battle of Britain. After the Communist takeover of Czechoslovakia he escaped and settled in the US, where he worked as a design engineer.

== Early life ==
Ambruš was born on 9 May 1899 in Gorna Mitropolia (Горна Митрополия) in the Plevenska Oblast of northern Bulgaria. His parents belonged to a Slovak community that was invited to settle in Bulgaria after its liberation from the Ottoman Empire in 1878.

In the First World War Ambruš studied at the Hungarian Ludovica Military Academy in Budapest. He graduated in 1919 after the founding of the First Czechoslovak Republic and was commissioned into the Czechoslovak Army as an officer.

In 1925 Ambruš transferred to the Czechoslovak Air Force. He became a successful pilot who won awards at aerobatic competitions, including at Vincennes in 1934, and at the 1936 Summer Olympics. In 1938 he commanded the Czechoslovak Air Force Test Group in Prague and flew the Tatra T.101 on its record-breaking flight from Prague to Khartoum, Sudan.

== Second World War ==
In 1939 Ambruš was made a squadron commander in Prague. He escaped the German occupation of Czechoslovakia via Yugoslavia to France, where he worked for the Czechoslovak government-in-exile and then fought in the Battle of France. When France capitulated to Germany Ambruš was evacuated by ship from Bordeaux to Falmouth in England.

Ambruš was commissioned into the Royal Air Force Volunteer Reserve as a Pilot Officer. On 12 July 1940 he was posted No. 310 Squadron RAF at RAF Duxford in Cambridgeshire. He converted to the Hawker Hurricane Mk I fighter in August 1940 at No. 6 Operational Training Unit at RAF Sutton Bridge in Lincolnshire. He was then posted back to Duxford to the newly formed No. 312 (Czechoslovak) Squadron RAF, and on 10 September took command as Squadron Leader.

On 11 October Ambruš led a patrol of several Hurricane Mk I fighters that helped a flight from No. 611 Squadron RAF to shoot down a Luftwaffe Dornier Do 17 Z-3 of I/Kampfgruppe 606 between Prestatyn in Wales and Chester in England. The other 312 Squadron pilots who took part in the victory were Josef Jaške, Josef Keprt, Frank Tyson and Alois Vašátko.

Two days later Ambruš again led a flight of three Hurricane Mk I fighters on patrol. The other two pilots in the flight were Harry Comerford and Josef Stehlík. Over the Irish Sea Ambruš mistakenly led the flight to attack two Bristol Blenheim Mk IF light bombers of No. 29 Squadron RAF. One Blenheim, L6637, code letters RO-S, crashed into the sea off Point of Ayre on the Isle of Man and not far from the Morecambe Bay light ship. All three of its were killed. The other Blenheim, L7135, code letters RO-S, survived with minor damage and returned safely to RAF Ternhill in Shropshire with its crew unharmed.

On 17 December as a result of the friendly fire incident Ambruš was relieved of his command of 312 Squadron. He was transferred to the Inspectorate-General of the Czechoslovak Air Force in London, where he worked until the end of 1941. In 1942 he was promoted to Wing Commander and posted to Canada, where he was Air Attaché at the Czechoslovak Embassy in Ottawa till the end of war.

== Post-war life ==
After the war Ambruš returned to Czechoslovakia was made commander of the 4th Aviation military wing.

After the Communist 1948 Czechoslovak coup d'état Ambruš escaped to the UK. He emigrated to the United States and settled in Chicago. He worked as a design engineer, planning for highways, airports, air-pollution control systems and chemical plants.

In 1985 Ambruš moved to the Bohemian Home for the Aged in Chicago. He died there on 2 January 1994. After his death his remains were taken to Slovakia and buried in the Slávičie údolie cemetery in Bratislava.

== Honours and awards ==
Czechoslovakia, France, Britain and Romania all awarded medals to Ambruš. His decorations include:

Milan Rastislav Stefanik Order, third class
Czechoslovak War Cross 1939–1945
Československá medaile Za chrabrost před nepřítelem ("Bravery in Face of the Enemy")
Československá medaile za zásluhy, 1. stupně ("Medal of Merit, First Class")
Pamětní medaile československé armády v zahraničí ("Commemorative Medal of the Czechoslovak Army Abroad") with France and Great Britain bars
Officer of the Order of the British Empire (OBE)
1939–1945 Star with Battle of Britain clasp
Defence Medal
War Medal 1939–1945
Order of the Crown, Fifth Class
