= Breda Ba.39 =

Ba.39
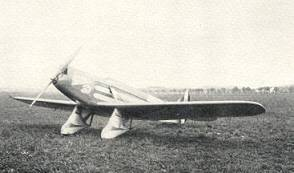

General information
- Type: touring and liaison
- Manufacturer: Società Italiana Ernesto Breda

History
- First flight: September 1932

The Breda Ba.39, a touring and liaison aircraft designed and built in Italy, was a scaled-up version of the Breda Ba.33, achieving some success in sporting events, and distance flights.

== Operational history ==
The Italian air ministry ordered 60 Ba.39s, one of which was flown on a circuit of the Mediterranean Sea by Folonari and Malinverni, starting and finishing at Turin.

=== Paraguay ===
One Ba.39 was registered in Paraguay as ZP-PAA in early 1940, owned by Elías Navarro and Antonio Soljancic. Powered by a Colombo S.63 engine, it was used for express flights by a company called Navarro Expreso Aéreo. In October, 1940, this plane was destroyed in an accident near São Paulo, Brazil.

== Variants ==
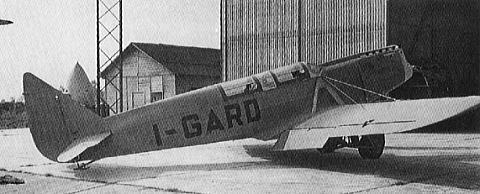

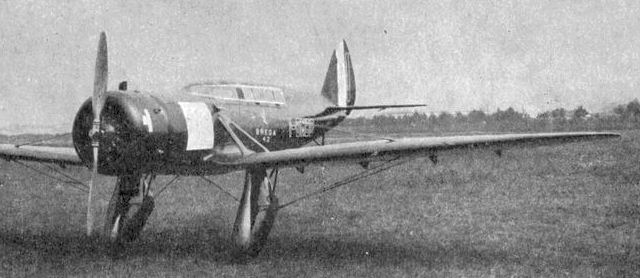
Breda Ba 42 photo from L'Aerophile October 1934

Ba.39
The standard two-seat touring and liaison aircraft
Ba.39S
Tandem three-seat touring, communications aircraft introduced in 1934.
Ba.39 Met
Ba.39 Col
Ba.42
In 1934 the Ba.42 was introduced powered by a 179.7 hp (134.00 kW) Fiat A.70S radial engine, with a NACA cowling.

== Operators ==
Kingdom of Italy

- Regia Aeronautica
- Italian Co-Belligerent Air Force

== Specifications (Ba.39) ==
Data from Italian Civil and Military aircraft 1930-1945

General characteristics

- Crew: 2 (3 for the Ba.39S)
- Length: 7.44 m (24 ft 5 in)
- Wingspan: 10.41 m (34 ft 2 in)
- Height: 2.64 m (8 ft 8 in)
- Wing area: 17.51 m^{2} (188.5 sq ft)
- Empty weight: 560 kg (1,235 lb)
- Gross weight: 840 kg (1,852 lb)
- Max takeoff weight: 935 kg (2,062 lb)
- Powerplant: 1 × Colombo S.63 6-cyl. inline piston engine, 100 kW (140 hp)

Performance

- Maximum speed: 220 km/h (137 mph, 119 kn)
- Range: 900 km (560 mi, 490 nmi)
- Endurance: 3 hr 30min
- Service ceiling: 6,000 m (19,700 ft)
- Rate of climb: 3.2 m/s (630 ft/min)
- Time to altitude: 13,210 ft (4,026 m) in 21 minutes
