= Kochubeyevsky Park =

Park in Ukraine

- Кочубеївський парк
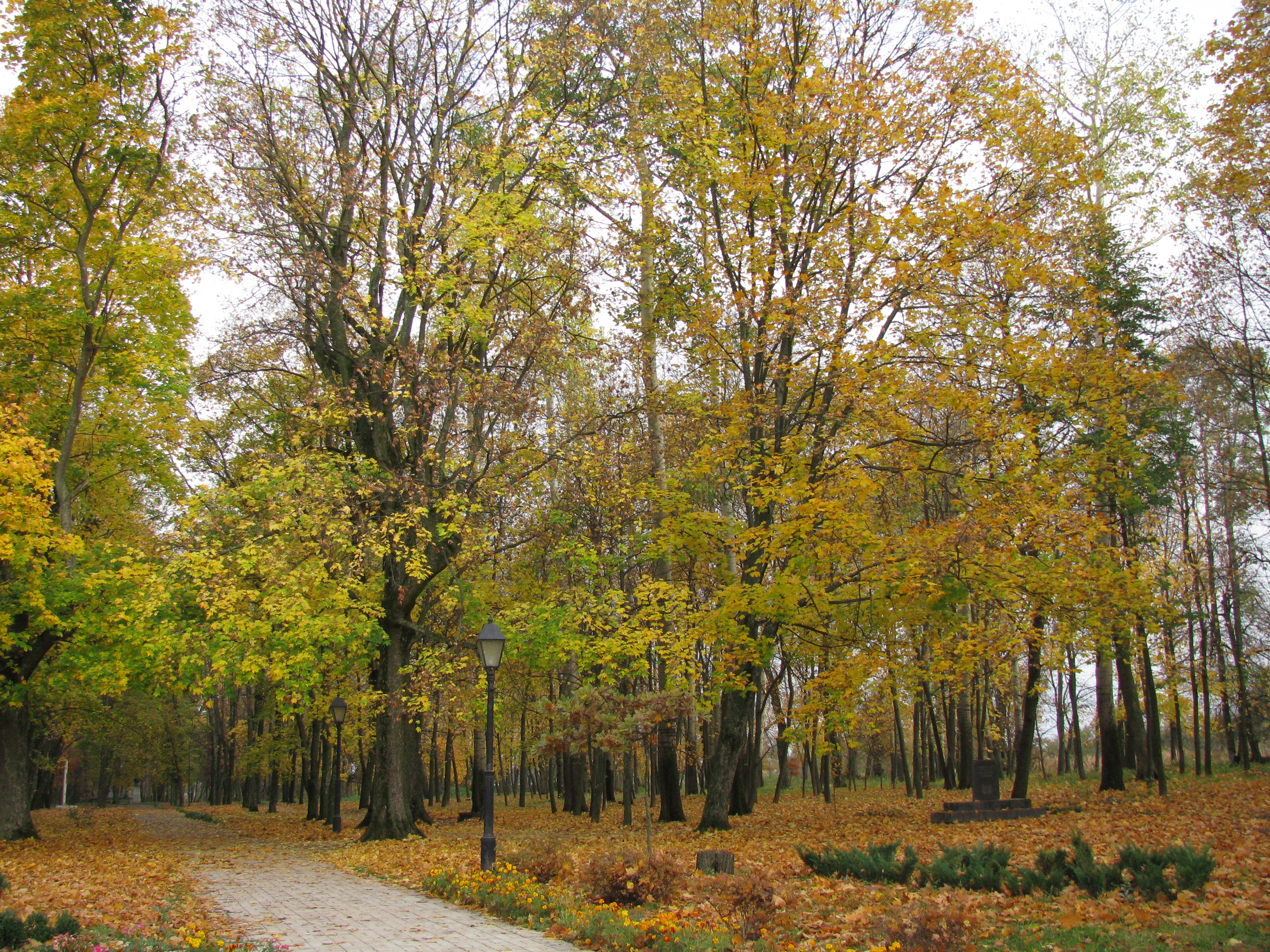
- Kochubeyevsky Park
- Established: 17th century
- Location: Baturyn, Ukraine
- Coordinates: 51.3365°N 32.8780°E
- Type: nature protection zone
- Visitors: 25,000 per year
- Curators: National Historical and Cultural Reserve “Hetman's Capital”
- Website: http://www.baturin-capital.gov.ua

Kochubeyevsky Park or Kochubeivskyi Park (Ukrainian: Кочубеївський парк) is a park in Baturyn, Nizhyn Raion, Chernihiv Oblast, Ukraine. It is a part of the National Historical and Cultural Preserve "Hetman's Capital".

It has an area of 9.9 hectares.

== History ==
The park was founded in the 19th century by the General Judge of Cossack Ukraine V. Kochubey. The basis of the park was an oak forest. The park combines regular and landscape planning, with natural and artificial plantations of different years, and about 34 species of trees and shrubs.

== Monuments ==
On the territory of the park there is an architectural monument of national importance, the House of the General Court (V. Kochubey's house) of the 17th century, mass graves of the Ukrainian Revolution and World War II, and monumental art of different periods, described below.

=== Monument to Ukrainian beekeeper Petro Prokopovych ===
Monument to P. I. Prokopovych, the Ukrainian beekeeper
- Interactive map of Monument to P. I. Prokopovych, the Ukrainian beekeeper

Immovable Monument of Local Significance of Ukraine
- Official name: Пам’ятник П.І. Прокоповичу, українському бджоляру (Monument to P. I. Prokopovych, the Ukrainian beekeeper)
- Type: Monumental Art
- Reference no.: 249-Чр

This monument to Petro Prokopovych was sculpted by Inna Kolomiets and erected in 1975.

=== Monument to Ukrainian writer Bohdan Lepky ===
This monument to Bohdan Lepky was sculpted by Ivan Sonsyadlo and erected in 1999.

=== Memorial sign dedicated to Ukrainian hetmans ===
The memorial sign to Ukrainian hetmans was erected in 1999. The inscription on the monument: "In the actions of the hetmans - the strength and state greatness of Ukraine."

=== Memorial sign dedicated to the oak ===
The memorial was erected on May 22, 2003 on the site of an oak tree that for centuries had been a symbol of the love legend of Hetman Ivan Mazepa and Motri Kochubey.

=== Sculpture "Motrya" ===
Sandstone sculpture created during the International Symposium "Baturyn-2008", and sculpted by Vladimir Protas.

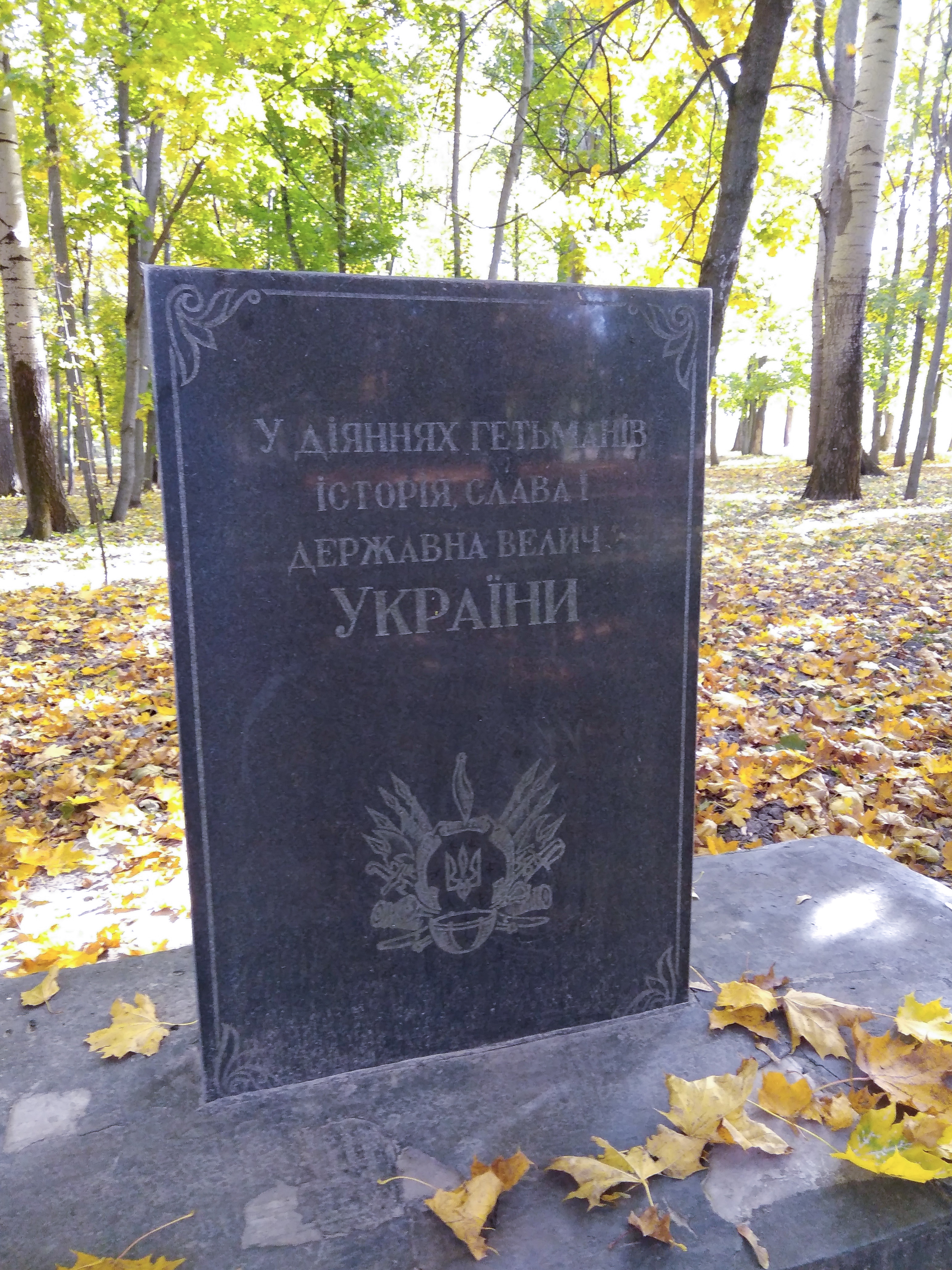
Monument to Ukrainian hetmans

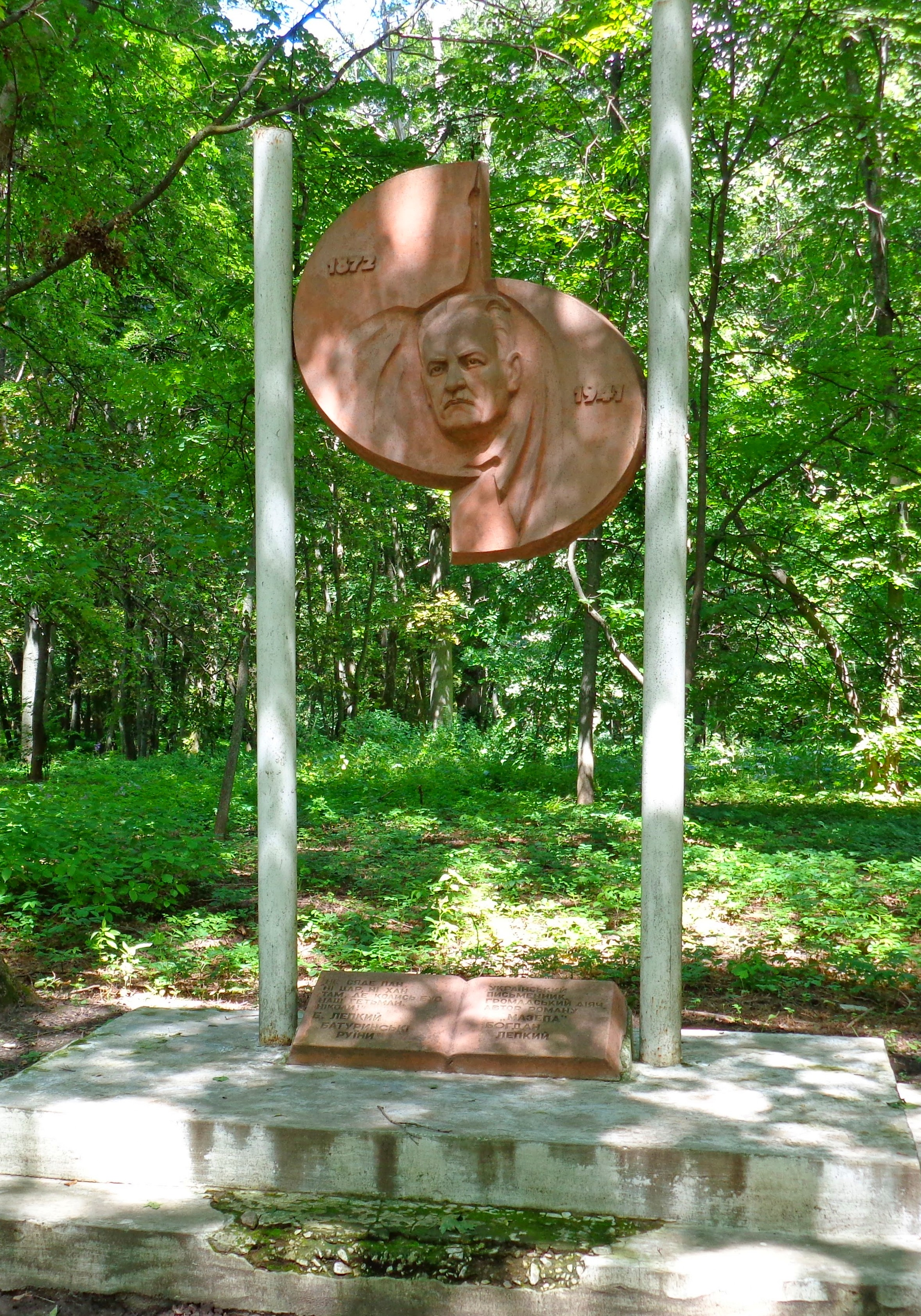
Monument to Ukrainian writer Bohdan Lepky

== Site of Kochubey's pond ==
According to legend, this pond was arranged by Vasyl Kochubey in the early 17th century. For 200 years it was a place of rest for owners and guests of the park. According to the natives, by the middle of the 20th century there were many fish and turtles in the pond. In summer, children bathed in the pond, women washed clothes, and men bathed horses. From the middle of the 20th century the pond began to dry up. Today the reservoir is lost.

== Visiting ==
The territory of the park is constantly open to the public. Guides work on the schedule of the Museum of the Judge General Vasyl Kochubey House.

== Gallery ==
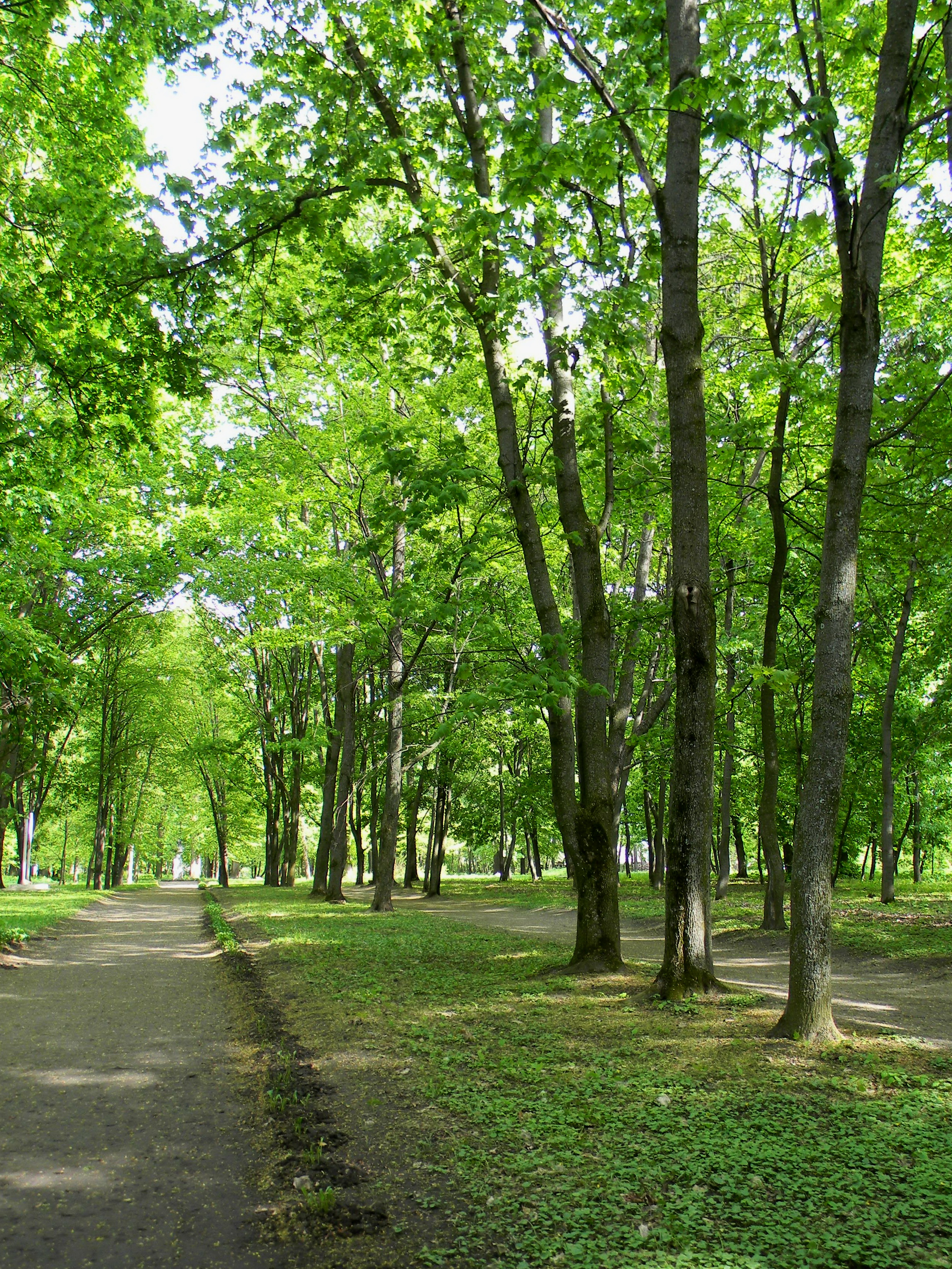
Alley in Kochubeyevsky Park

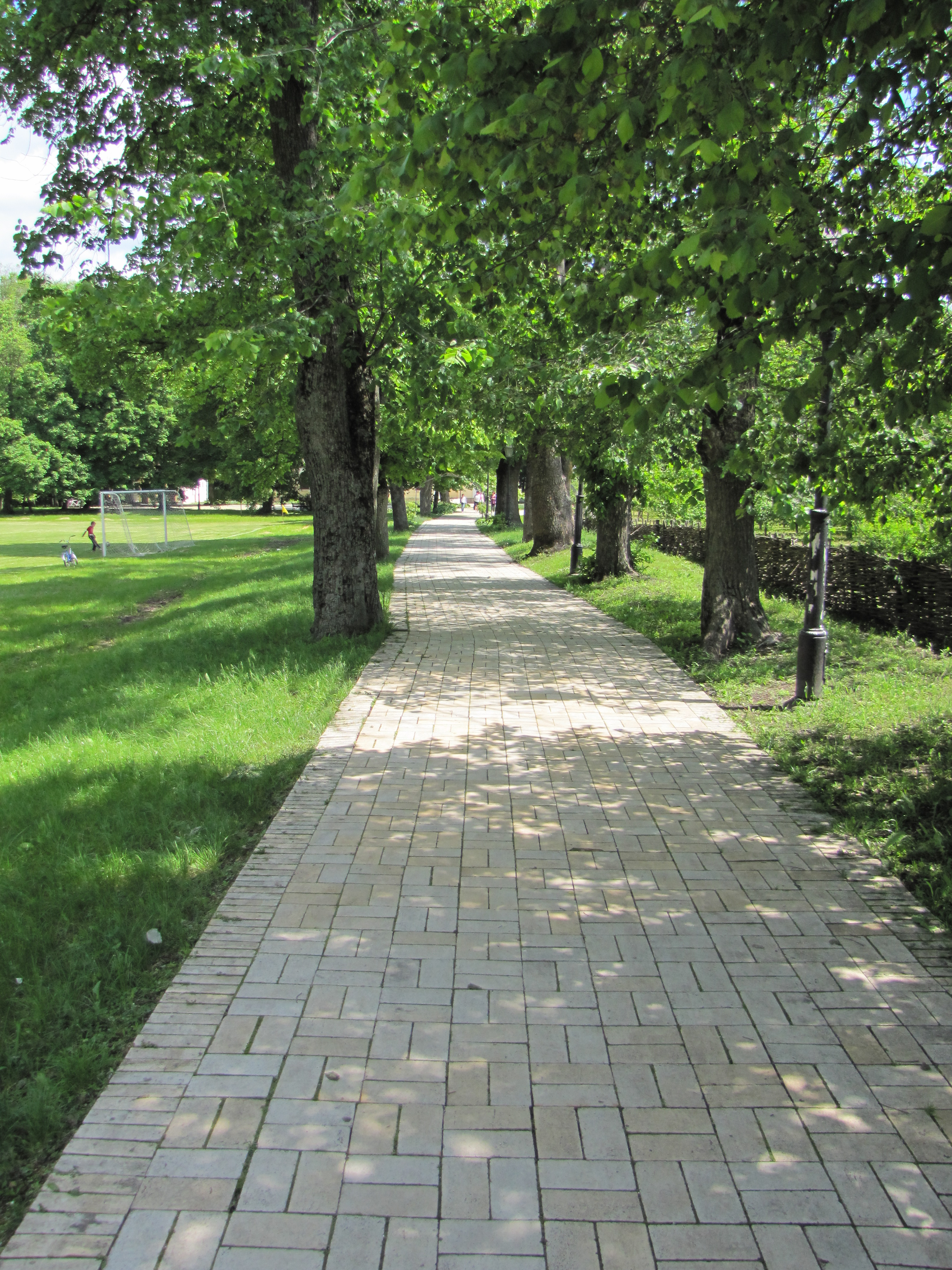
Alley in Kochubeyevsky Park

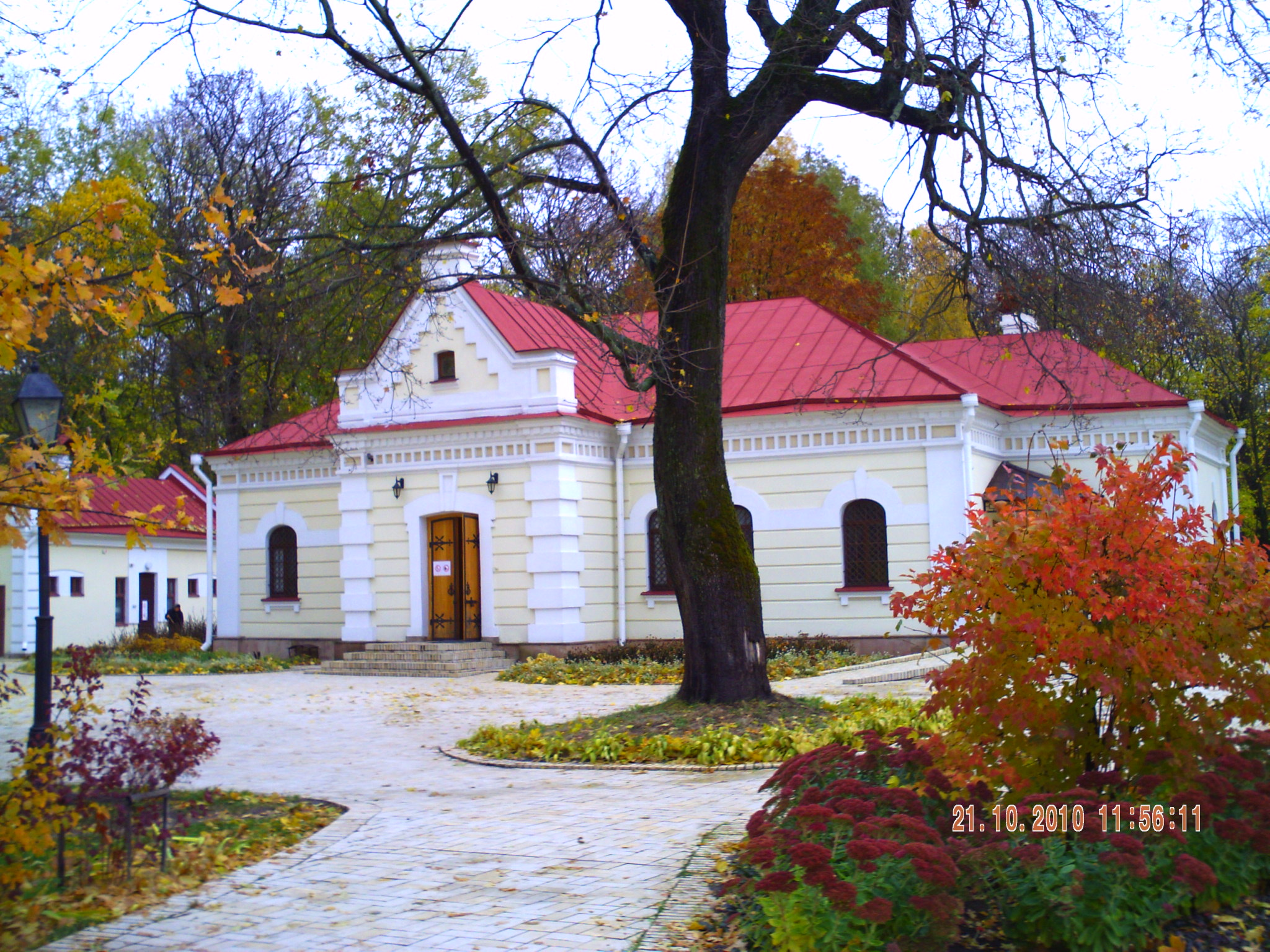
The Judge General Vasyl Kochubey House

Media related to Kochubeivskyi Park at Wikimedia Commons

== See also ==
- Kochubey family
- Baturyn Museum of Archeology
- Citadel of Baturyn Fortress
- House of Judge General Vasyl Kochubey
- Razumovski Palace
