= Kochubey House =

Judge General Vasyl Kochubey House
- Будинок генерального судді Василя Кочубея
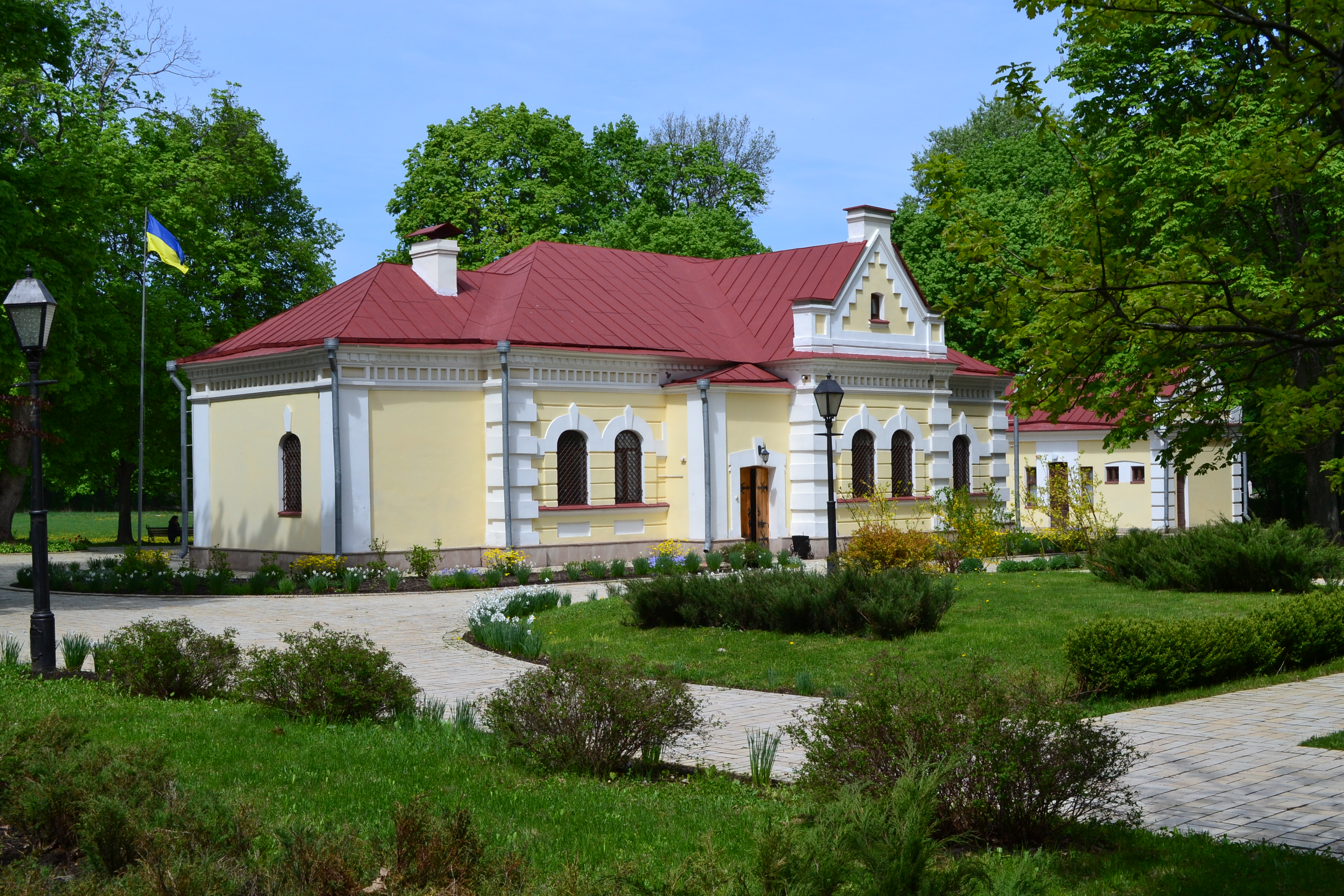
- The House of the General Court
- Established: 17th century
- Location: Baturyn, Ukraine
- Coordinates: 51.3365°N 32.8780°E
- Type: Museum
- Visitors: 25,000 per year
- Curators: National Historical and Cultural Reserve "Hetman's Capital"
- Website: http://www.baturin-capital.gov.ua

Immovable Monument of National Significance of Ukraine
- Official name: Будинок Генерального суду (Будинок Кочубея) (Building of the General Court (House of Kochubey))
- Type: Architecture
- Reference no.: 250058

The Kochubey House or the Judge General Vasyl Kochubey House (Ukrainian: Будинок генерального судді Василя Кочубея) is a museum in the Hetman's Capital National Historical and Cultural Reserve located in the historic city of Baturyn in Chernihiv Oblast, Ukraine.

External audio
- Audio tour″

== Building architecture ==
The building was built in the second half of the 17th century in the style of Ukrainian (Cossack) Baroque. The brick house is one story and has a basement. Its current appearance is not original, as it was severely damaged during World War II. During 1687–1708 the house served as an administrative-residential building for Clerk and Judge General Vasyl Kochubey.

== History of the building ==
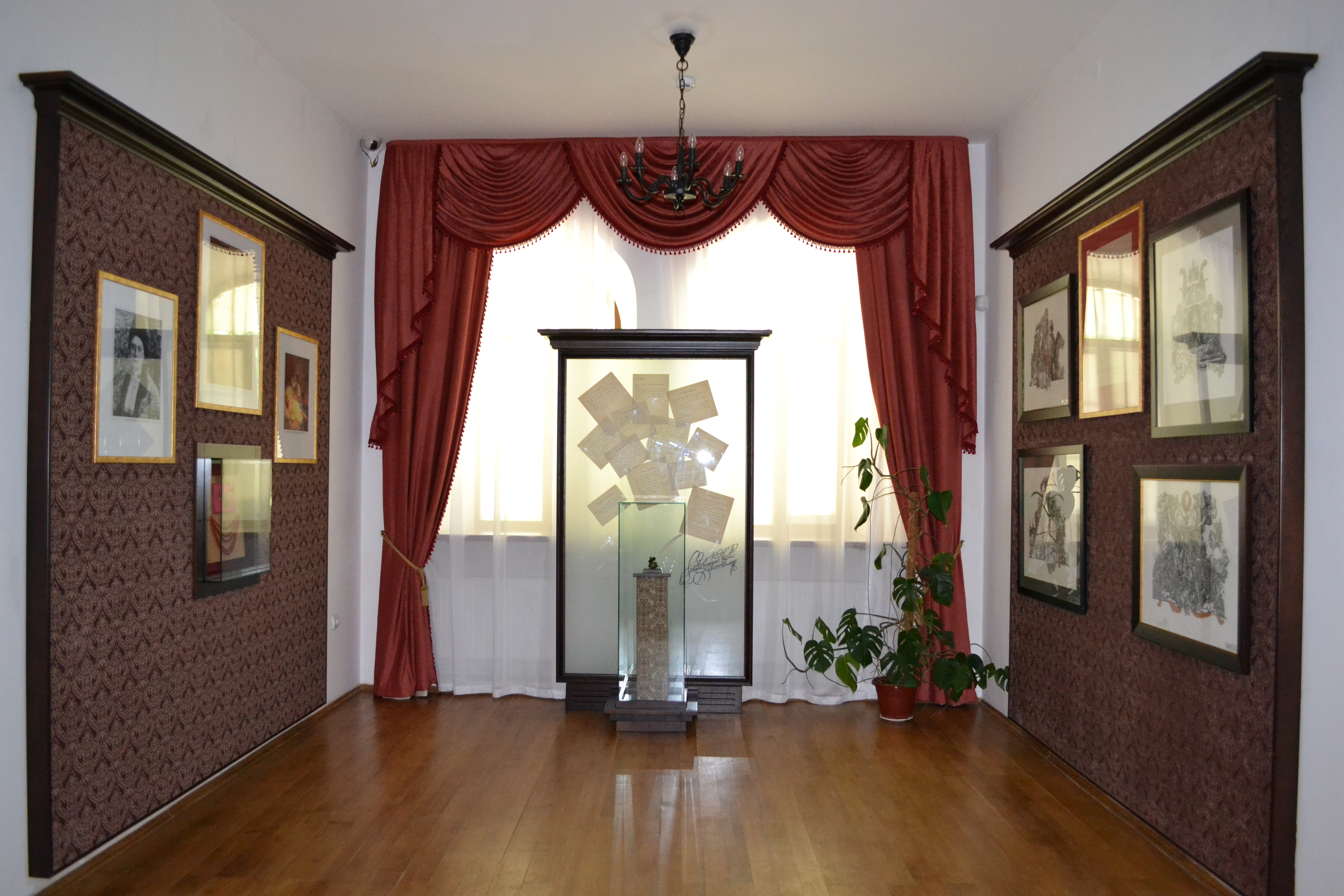
I. Mazepa's letters to Motria Kochubey

The Kochubey family owned the house until 1917.

In 1925, on the initiative of the Society of Beekeepers, a museum of beekeeping named after Peter Prokopovich was opened in the building. During the World War II, the house was severely damaged, with only the original walls remaining. Restoration of the house began in the early 1970s. In 1975 a museum of local lore was opened in the building.

In 1993, on the basis of the Baturyn Museum of History and Local Lore, the Baturyn State Historical and Cultural Reserve "Hetman's Capital" was established. Large-scale restoration of V. Kochubey's house took place in 2003–2005, and a new museum exhibition was later opened in 2007.

== Museum exhibition ==
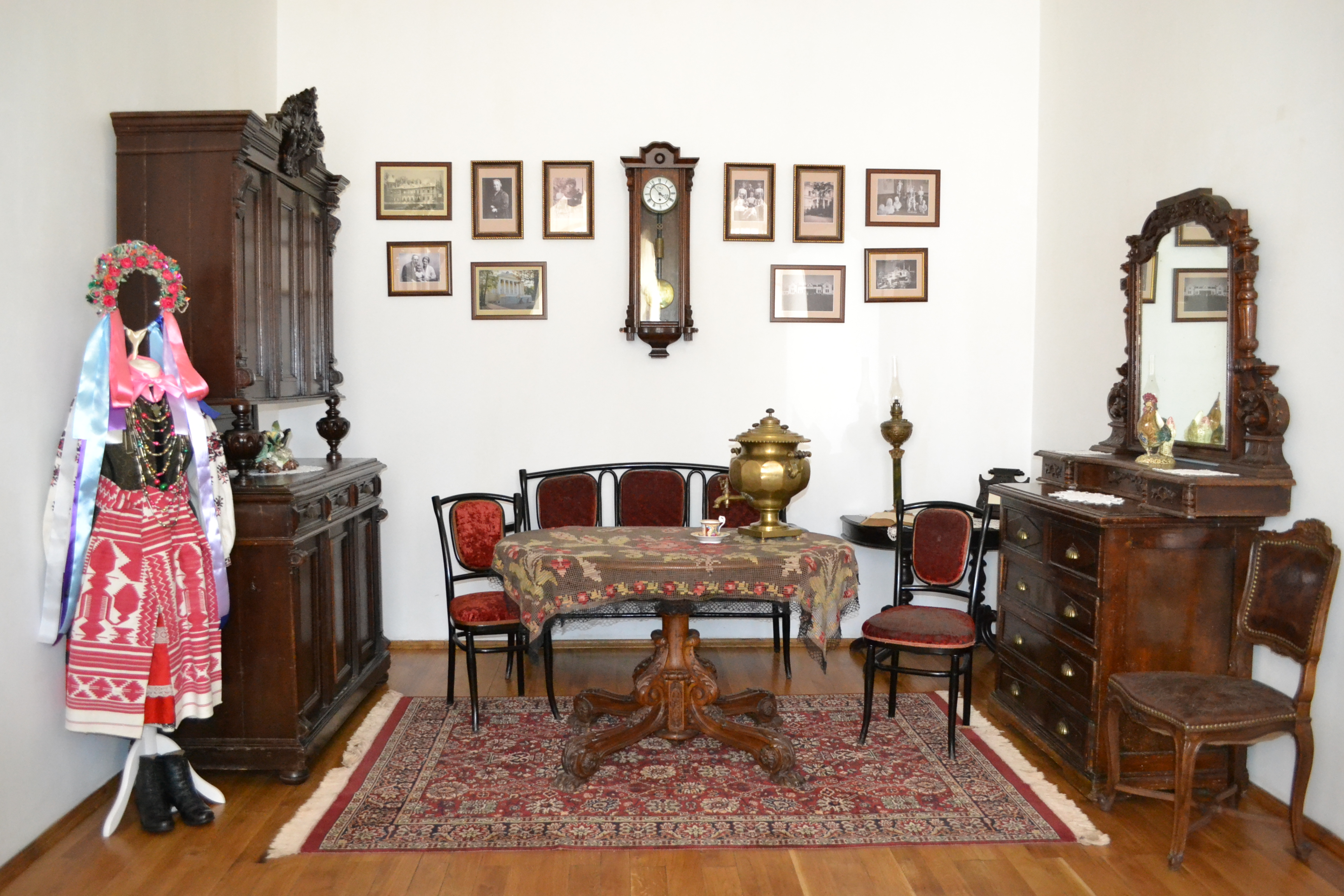
Museum exhibition

The museum exhibition is located in four halls and the basement of the house. In the first hall, the exhibition is dedicated to the history of the house's construction, restoration and use over time. This hall also includes a family tree and portraits of the Kochubey family.

The exhibition in the second hall is dedicated to Samiilo Velychko, author of the Cossack Chronicle.

The exhibition in the third hall is dedicated to the theme of love between Motri Kochubey and Hetman Ivan Mazepa, with the letters from Hetman Mazepa to Motrona occupying a central place. An icon of the Mother of God is also shown, which was donated in 1707 by Hetman Ivan Mazepa to the church of the city of Zhovkva in Lviv Oblast. The works of artists dedicated to the history of Great Love are presented.

The fourth exhibition hall presents the life of the last owner of the Kochubey estate, Vasyl Petrovych Kochubey, and the history of the Kochubey family. The exhibition presents original Kochubey furniture and documents.

The basement of the house has not been rebuilt in several centuries. The interior of the prison is recreated with wax figures of a court clerk and a prisoner, instruments of torture and images of Cossack punishments.

== Gallery ==
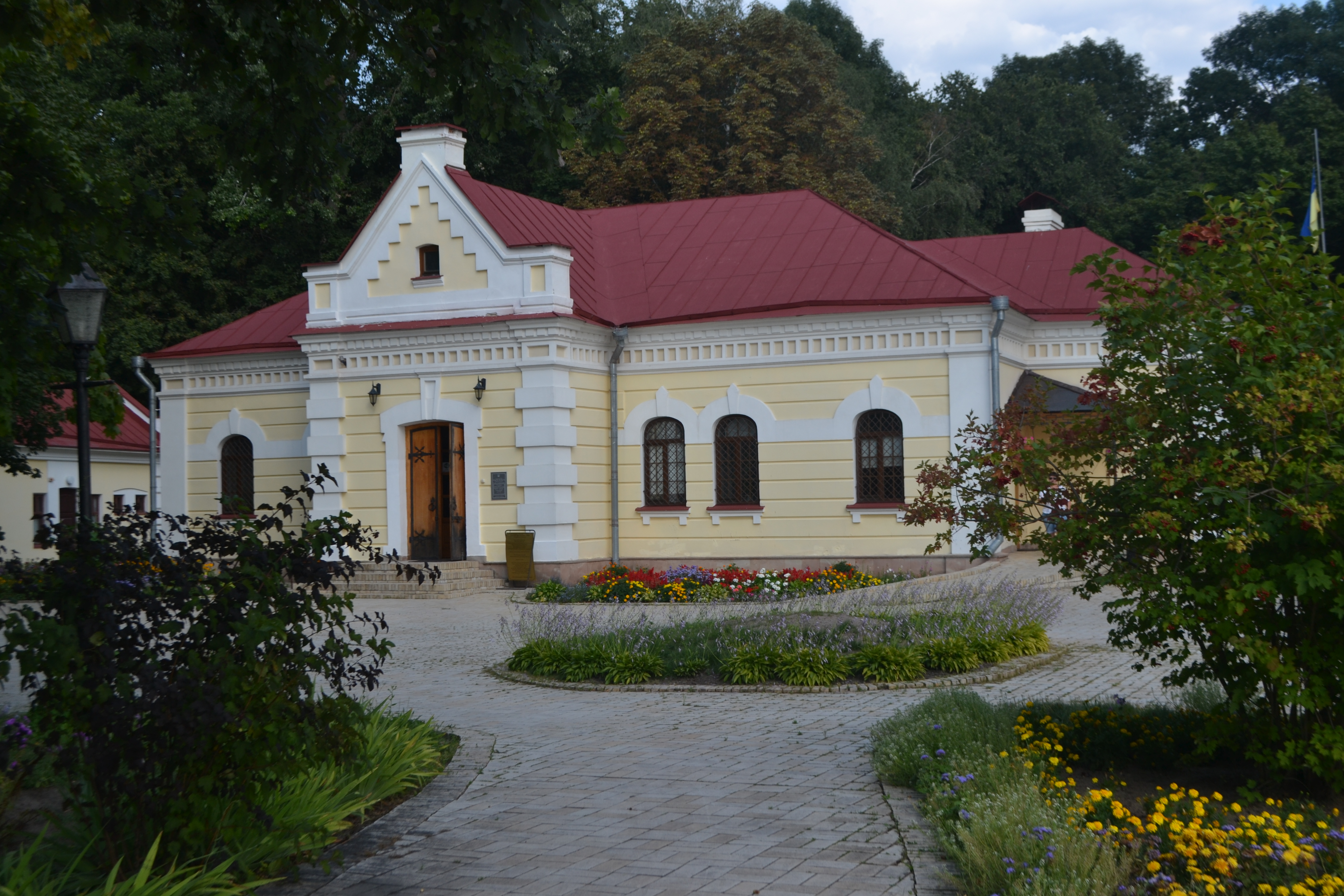
View of the Kochubey House

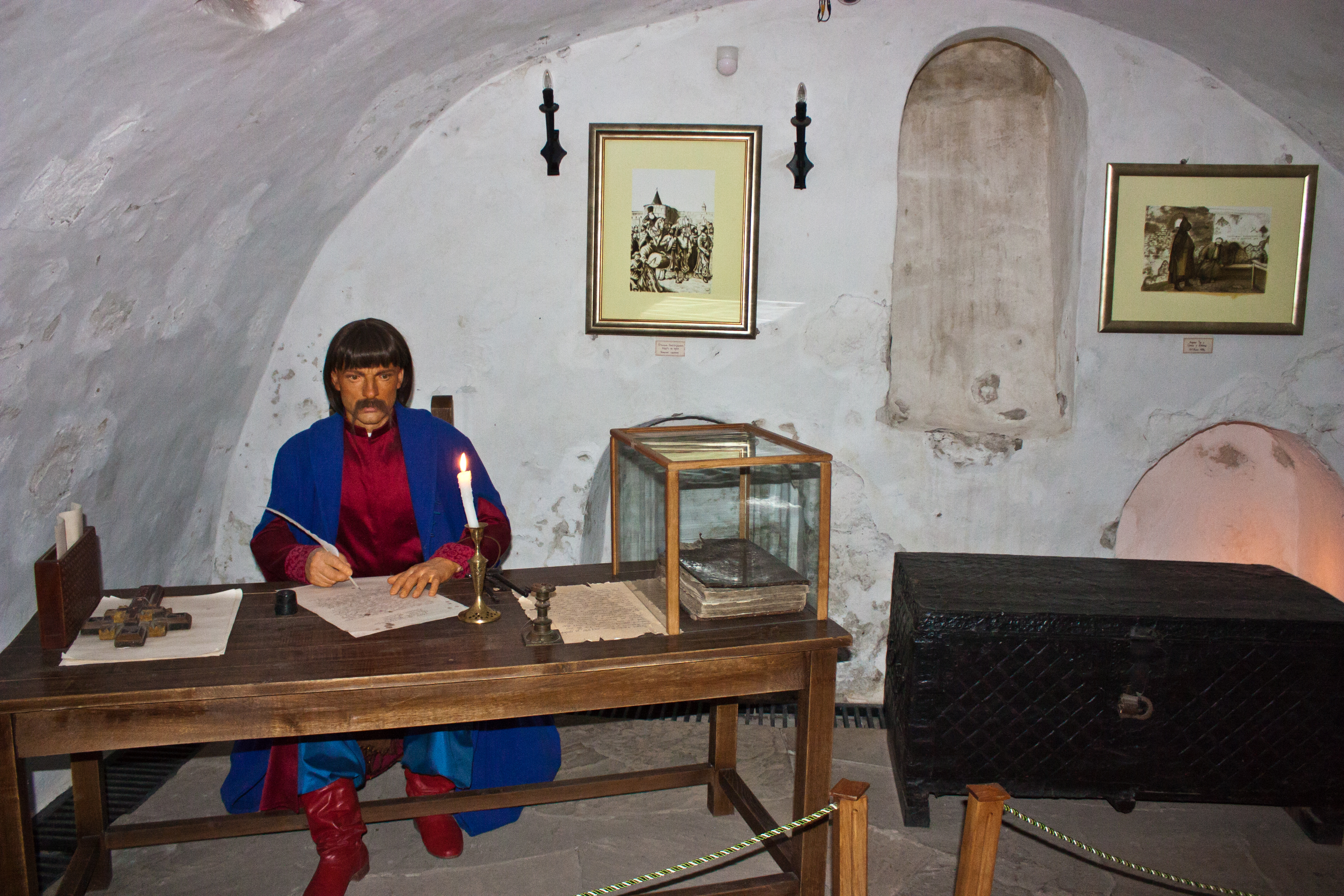
Museum exhibition

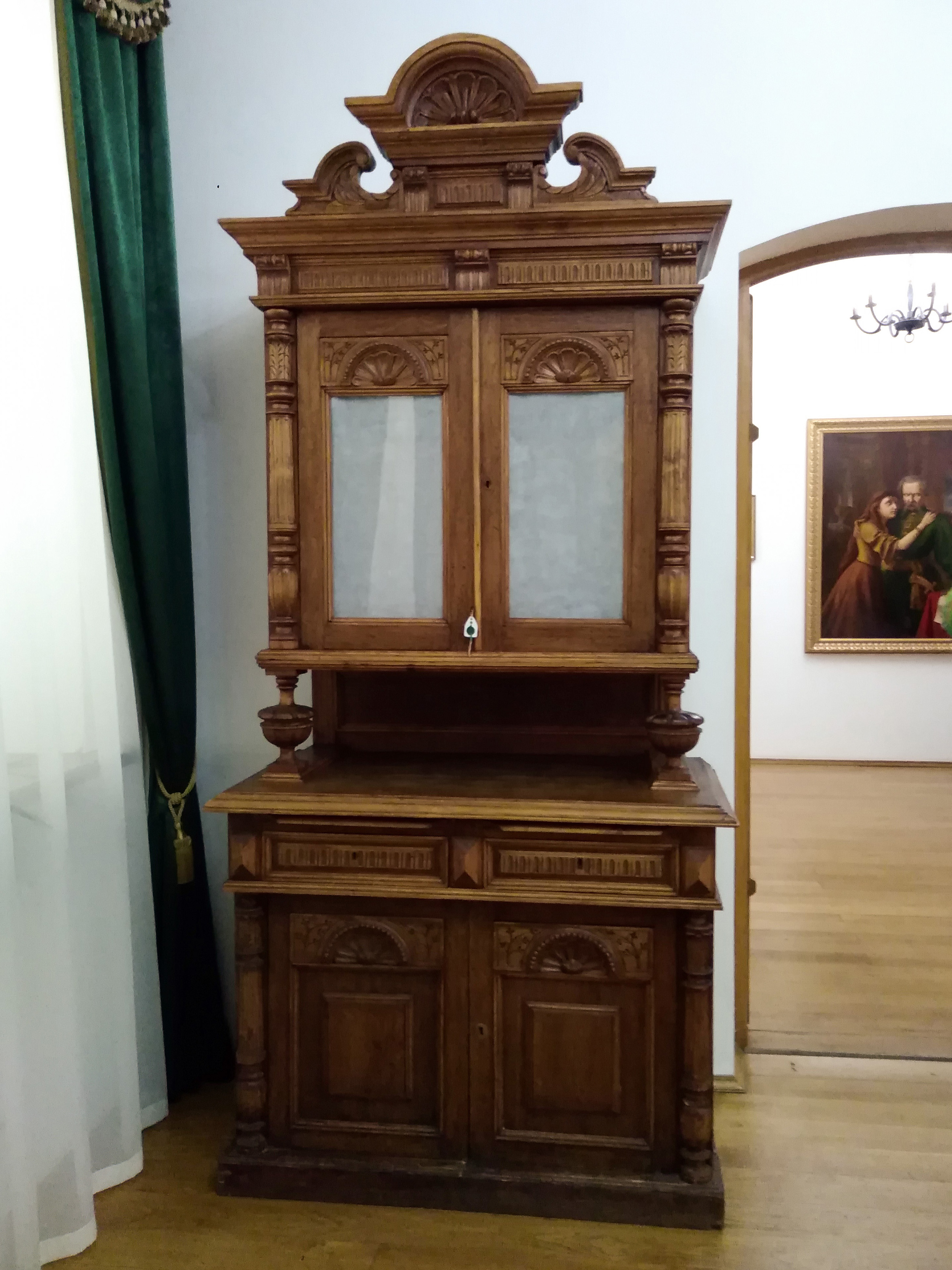
Museum exhibition

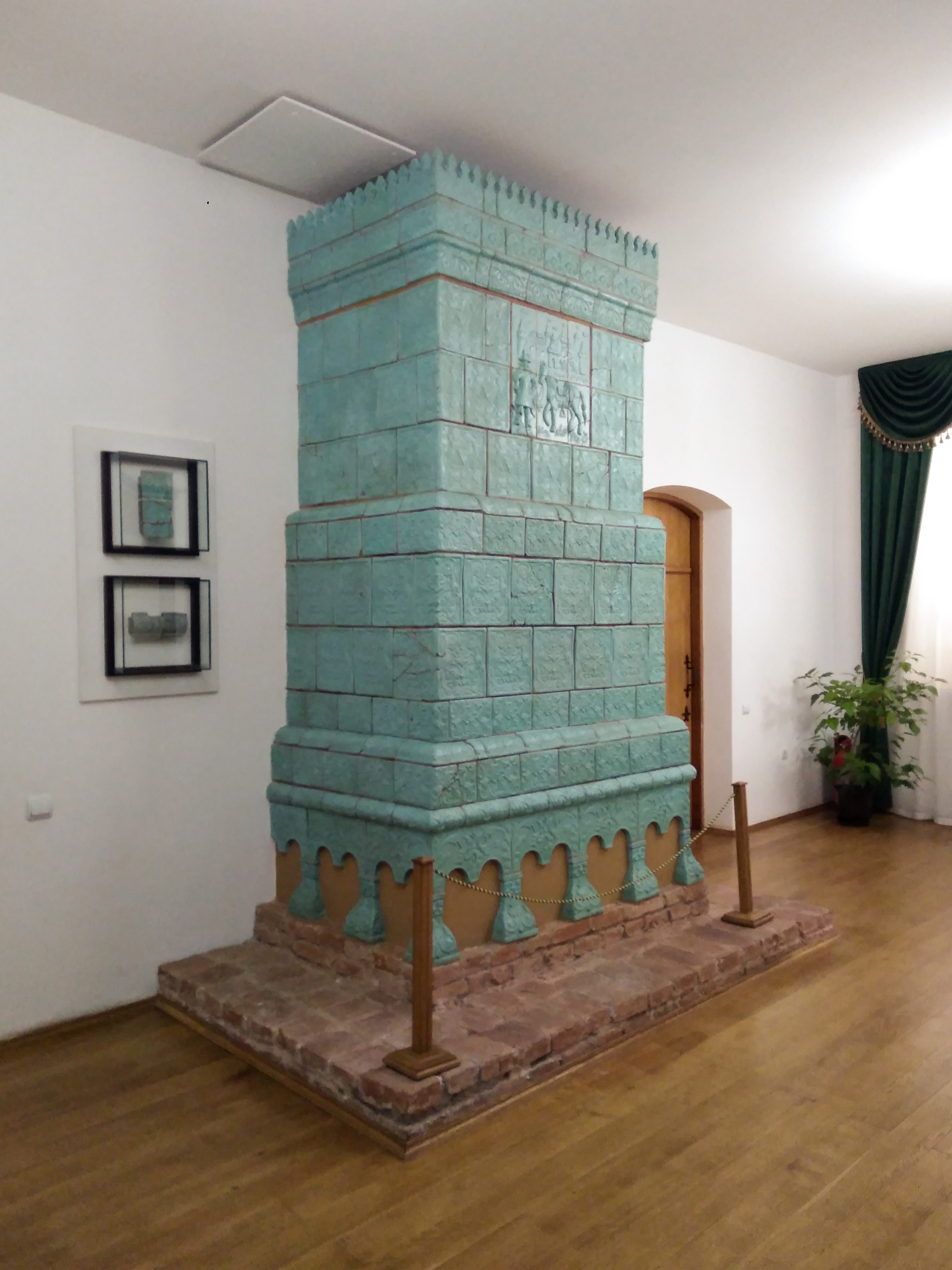
A traditional furnace in the museum's exhibition

== See also ==
- Kochubey family
- Kochubeyevsky Park
