= Motrona Kochubey =

Ukrainian noblewoman (1688–1736)

- Born: Motrona Vasylivna Kochubey; 1688; Dykanka, Cossack Hetmanate
- Died: January 20, 1736 (aged 47–48); Poltava, Russian Empire
- Other names: Matryona Vasilyevna Kochubey; Sister Melania
- Occupations: Noblewoman, nun
- Known for: Relationship with Ivan Mazepa
- Spouse: Semen Chuykevych (m. 1707)
- Parent(s): Vasyl Kochubey (father); Liubov Zhuchenko (mother)
- Family: Kochubey family

Motrona Vasylivna Kochubey (Matryona Vasilyevna Kochubey; 1688 – 20 January 1736) was a Ukrainian noblewoman and the daughter of General Judge Vasyl Kochubey. She is best known for her romantic involvement with Hetman Ivan Mazepa.

== Family ==
Motrona was the daughter of Vasyl Kochubey and his wife, Liubov Zhuchenko. Her family was of Crimean Tatar descent, tracing back to a bey named Küçük.

In 1707, she married Semen Vasylyovych Chuykevych (1670–1744), the son of Vasyl Chuykevych and a colonel in the Nizhyn Regiment.

== Biography ==
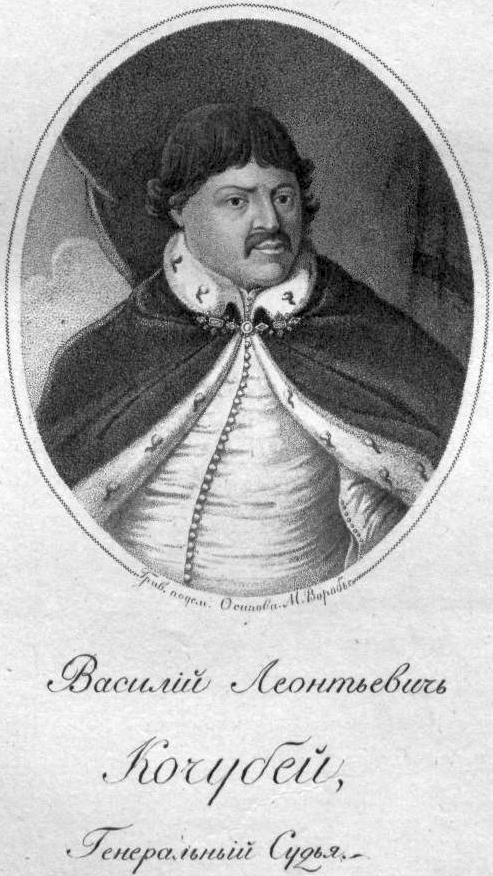
Vasyl Kochubey, Motrona's father.

Motrona was born in 1688 in Poltava (or Dykanka) into a prominent Ukrainian noble family. Her father held high-ranking positions in the Cossack Hetmanate, serving as Regent of the Military Chancellery, General Secretary, and eventually General Judge (Chief Justice) in 1694. In 1700, he was elevated to the rank of Stolnik.

As the youngest daughter, Motrona received a high-quality education and was noted for her beauty. Her godfather was the Hetman of the Zaporozhian Host, Ivan Mazepa.

In 1704, at the age of 16, Motrona fell in love with her 65-year-old godfather. Mazepa, a widower since 1702, proposed marriage. However, her father, Vasyl Kochubey, refused the union, as the Eastern Orthodox Church considered a marriage between a godchild and a godparent to be spiritual incest. To prevent the relationship, her parents attempted to send her to a monastery. Motrona fled and sought refuge with Mazepa, but the Hetman, wishing to avoid an open conflict with her influential family, sent her back to her parents' home.

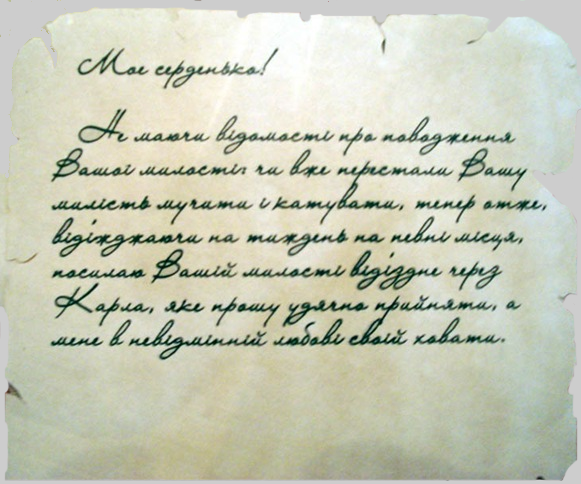
A letter from Ivan Mazepa to Motrona Kochubey.

Between 1704 and 1705, Mazepa sent her numerous letters (12 of which have survived) and gifts. In these letters, he expressed his passion and frequently criticized her parents for their opposition. Over time, the relationship faded. Following the execution of her father in 1708 for his role in a conspiracy against Mazepa, the family was initially disgraced but later pardoned in 1709.

On 8 July 1709, Motrona's husband, Semen Chuykevych, fought alongside Mazepa at the Battle of Poltava. Following the defeat, he was captured and exiled to Siberia; Motrona followed her husband into exile.

== Later life and death ==
Upon returning to Ukraine from exile, Motrona took the veil and became a nun, adopting the name Sister Melania. From 1733 to 1736, she served as the Mother Superior at the Pushkarivskyi Ascension Monastery in Poltava. She died on 20 January 1736 and was buried in the monastery cemetery.

== In culture ==
The story of Motrona and Mazepa has been romanticized in literature and music, though her name is often changed to '''Maria''':

- In Alexander Pushkin's poem Poltava, she appears as Maria.
- In Pyotr Ilyich Tchaikovsky's opera Mazeppa (based on Pushkin's poem and a libretto by Viktor Burenin), she is also named Maria.
