= Razumovski Palace =

Razumovski Palace can refer to two palaces built for Hetman Kirill Razumovski:

- Razumovski Palace, in Baturyn, Ukraine
- Razumovski Palace, in Hlukhiv, Ukraine
