= Hetman's Capital =

National Historical and Cultural Reserve "Hetman's Capital"
- Location within Ukraine
- Location: Baturyn, Chernihiv Oblast, Ukraine
- Nearest city: Baturyn
- Coordinates: 51°21′N 32°53′E
- Area: 0.57 km^{2} (0.22 sq mi)
- Established: 1993
- Governing body: Ministry of Culture and Information Policy

The National Historical and Cultural Reserve "Hetman's Capital" (Ukrainian: Гетьманська столиця, romanized: Hetmanska stolytsia) is a Ukrainian historical and cultural reserve of national importance.

It was created in 1993 on the basis of a complex of historical, cultural and natural monuments related to the history of the Ukrainian Cossacks during the Hetmanate, on the site of the residence of the Hetman of Zaporizhian Host – Demyan Ignatovych, Ivan Samoilovich, Ivan Mazepa and Kyrylo Rozumovsky.

The reserve is managed by the Ministry of Culture.

External audio
- Audio tour

External videos
- Video tour

== Description ==
The reserve contains 39 cultural heritage sites. These are monuments of archeology, architecture, garden and monumental art, and history. Sights of national importance:

- Hetman Kyrylo Rozumovsky Palace is the only surviving Hetman's palace in Ukraine. Built in 1799-1803 by the famous Scottish architect Charles Cameron.
- The House of the General Court (Vasyl Kochubey's House) of the end of the 17th century has a rare Ukrainian Baroque architecture that has survived to the present day.
- Resurrection Church – the tomb of Hetman Kyrylo Rozumovsky, 1803 – a church with a rare for Ukraine burial of a statesman of the Cossack times.
- The bell tower of the Baturyn Mykolayiv Krupitsky Monastery, 1823-1825 – part of the Krupitsky Monastery Ensemble.
- Monument to the victims of the Baturyn tragedy of 1708 (2004) - erected in honor of thousands of defenders and civilians of Baturyn, who were killed by order of Russian Tsar Peter I in revenge for the alliance of Ukrainian Hetman Mazepa with Swedish King Karl XII.

== History ==
Immediately after the establishment of the institution, work began in the direction of research and preservation of monuments, the formation of the stock collection. At the initiative of the management of the reserve in 1995 on the territory of Baturyn began archaeological research of Chernihiv State Pedagogical University. T. Shevchenko and the Institute of Archeology of the National Academy of Sciences of Ukraine. The materials obtained by the archeological expedition and their publication attracted the attention of the general public and the authorities to Baturyn. Since then, excavations in Baturyn have been held annually. Since 1997, the Hetman's Capital Reserve has been holding scientific conferences – Baturyn Readings. Since 2008 a collection of scientific works “Baturyn Antiquity” is published.

There are 4 museums in the reserve.

Since 2003, under the auspices of Viktor Yushchenko, a large-scale restoration of the reserve’s monuments has been carried out in Baturyn. Architectural monuments have been restored – the House of Judge General Vasyl Kochubey, the Church of the Resurrection, the Palace of Kyrylo Rozumovsky and the Church of the Resurrection. The architectural and memorial complex "Citadel of Baturyn Fortress”.

The stock collection of the reserve currently numbers almost 20,000 items. It is formed by the work of the staff of the institution. Cooperation with government agencies, artists and philanthropists played an important role in this matter. The Hetman's Capital Reserve is also a major research institution.

== Museums ==
- Baturyn Museum of Archeology
- Citadel of Baturyn Fortress
- House of Judge General Vasyl Kochubey
- Razumovski Palace

== Gallery ==
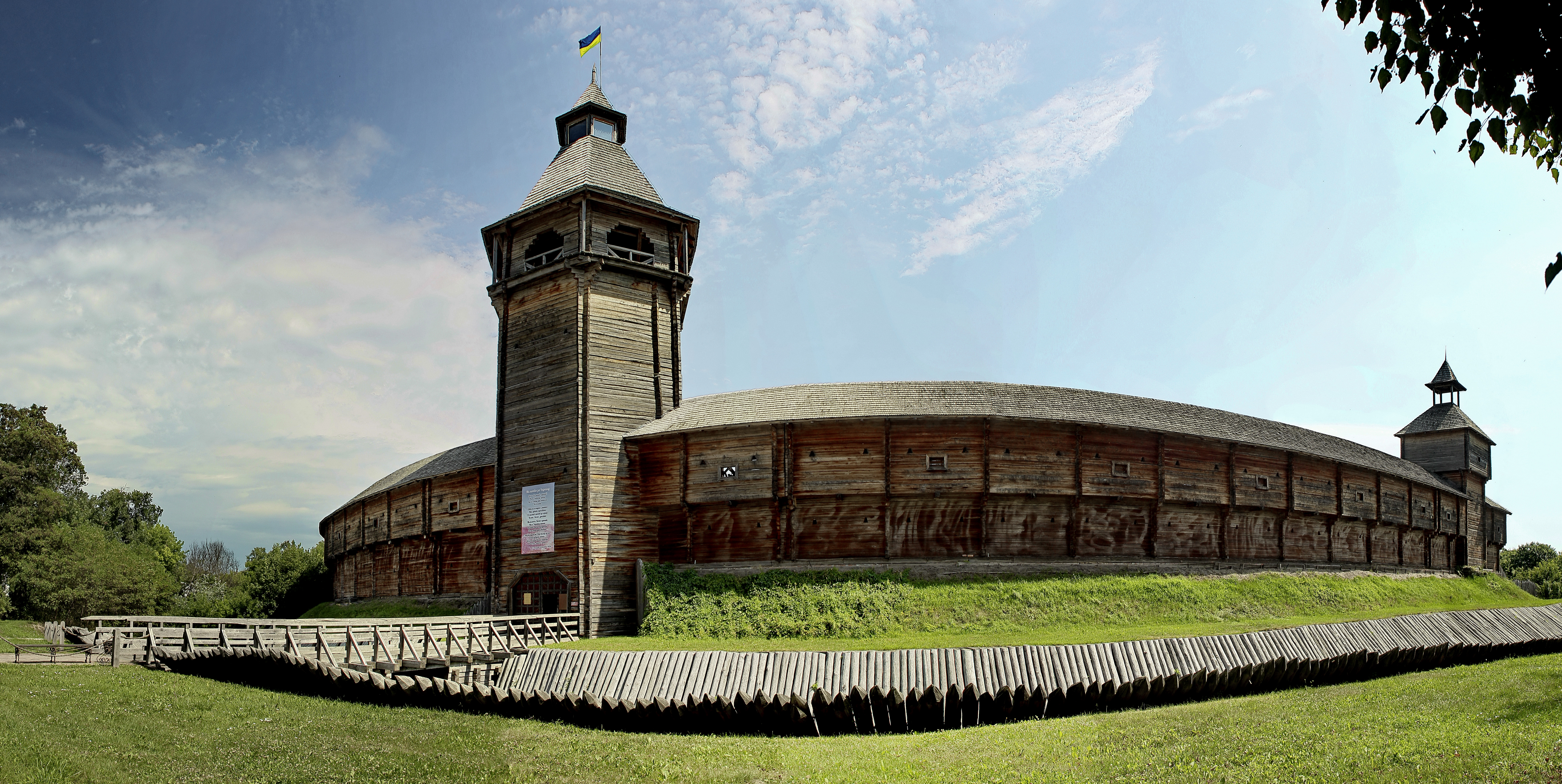
Citadel of Baturyn Fortress

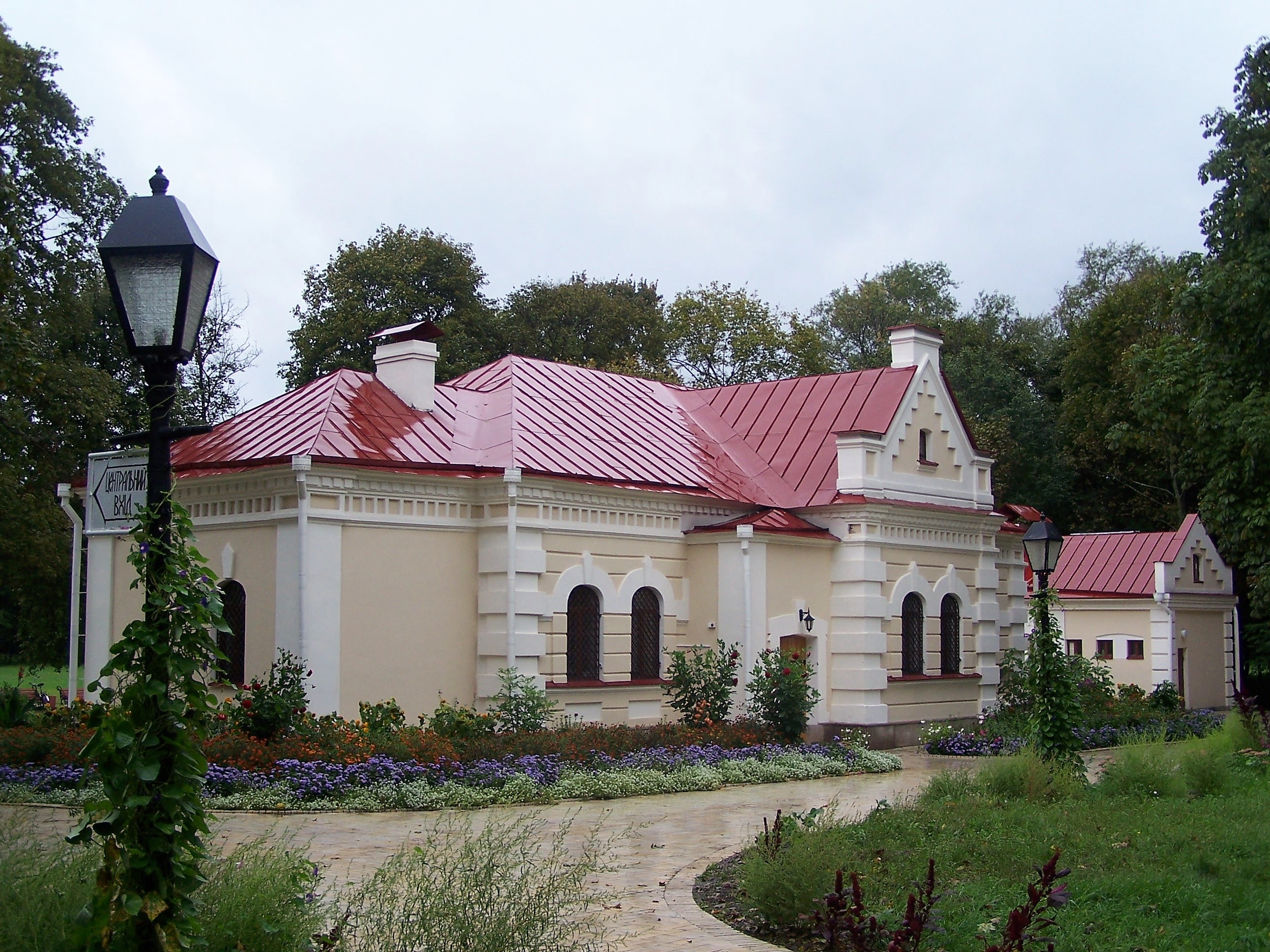
The House of Judge General Vasyl Kochubey of the end of the 17th century

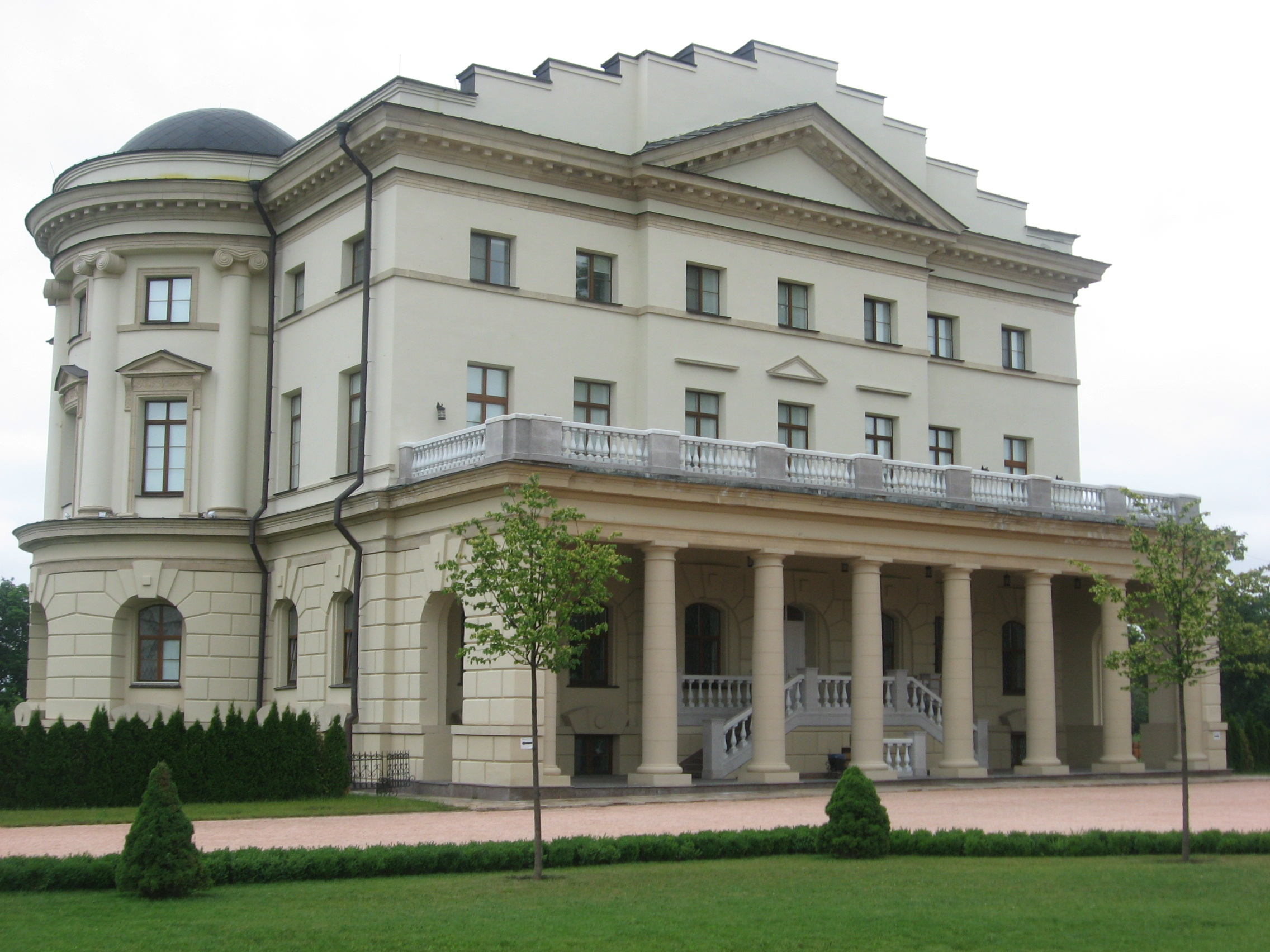
Hetman Kirill Rozumovsky Palace

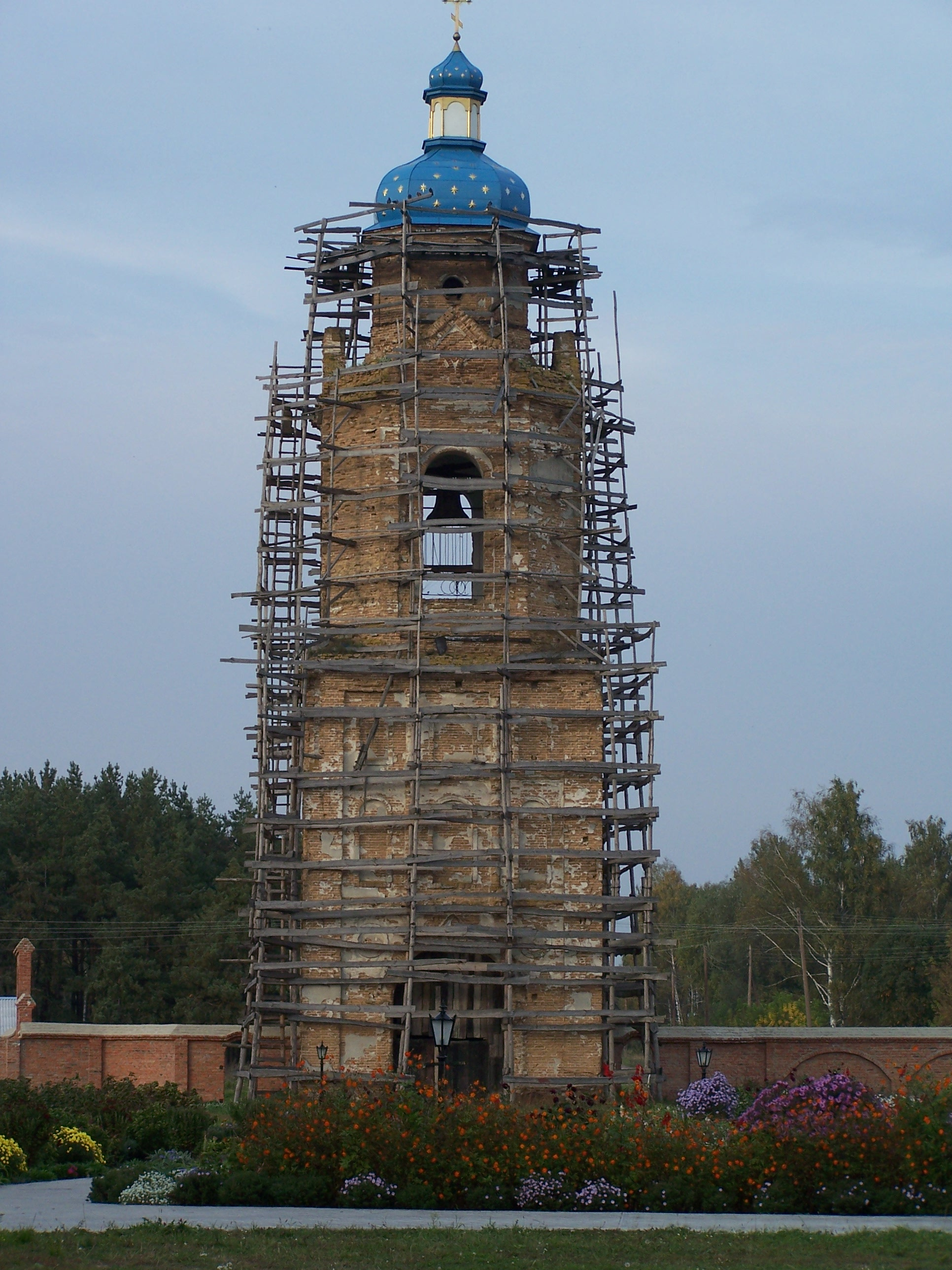
The bell tower of the Baturyn Mykolayiv Krupitsky Monastery, 1823-1825

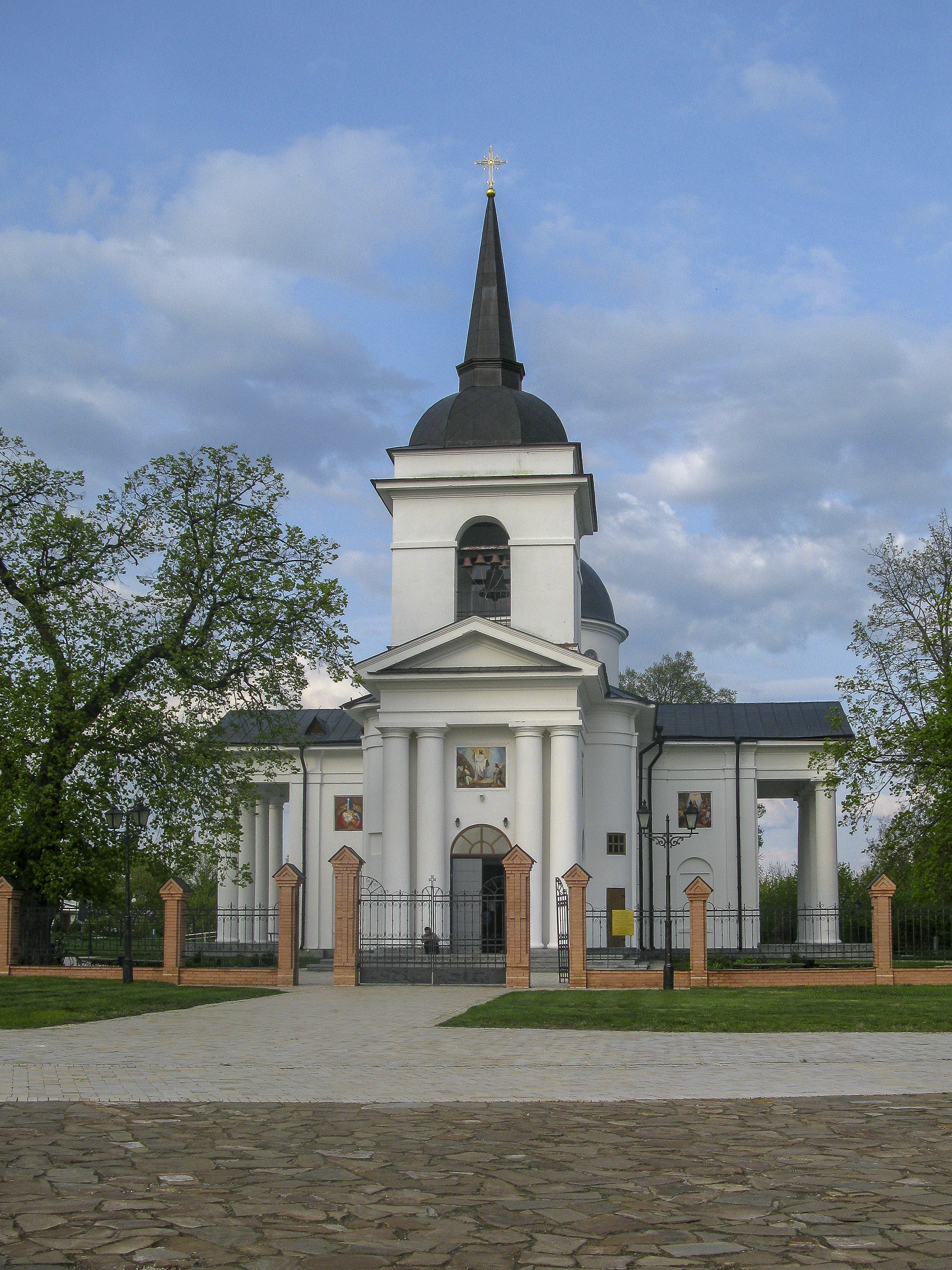
Resurrection Church – the tomb of Hetman K. Rozumovsky, 1803

== See also ==
- Kochubeyevsky Park
