= Baturyn Museum of Archeology =

- Музей археології Батурина
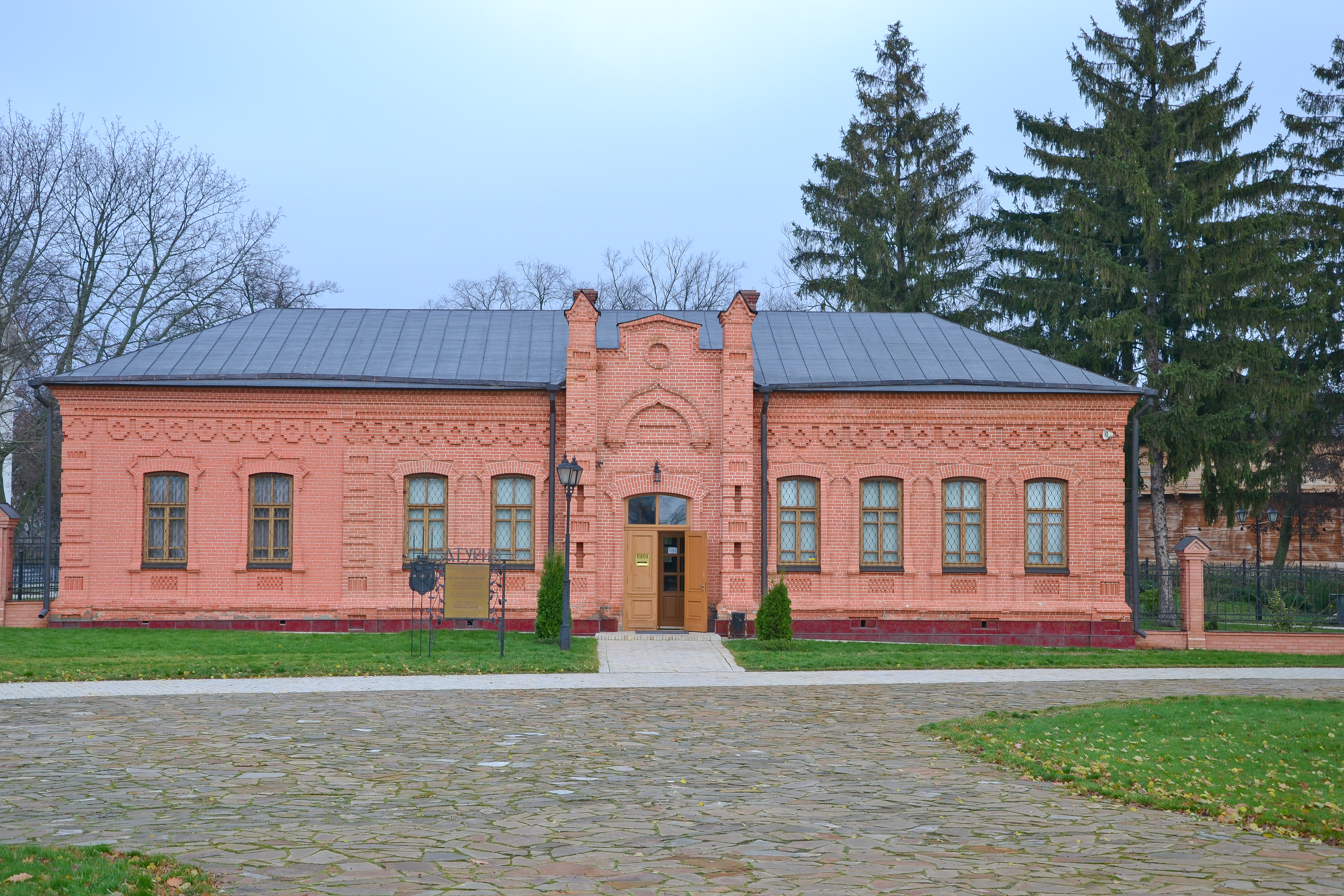
- Parish school of the Resurrection Church
- Established: 2009
- Location: Baturyn, Ukraine
- Coordinates: 51°20′34.44″N 32°53′6.72″E
- Type: Museum
- Visitors: 20,000 per year
- Curators: National Historical and Cultural Reserve “Hetman's Capital”
- Website: http://www.baturin-capital.gov.ua

Immovable Monument of Local Significance of Ukraine
- Official name: Воскресенська церковно-парафіяльна школа (Resurrection Church and Parish School)
- Type: Architecture
- Reference no.: 5537-Чр

Baturyn Museum of Archeology (Ukrainian: Музей археології Батурина) is a museum of the National Historical and Cultural Reserve “Hetman's Capital” in Baturyn, Chernihiv Oblast, Ukraine.

External audio
- Audio tour

== Building ==
The museum is located in an architectural monument of local significance – the Resurrection Church and Parish School (1904), built in the complex with the Church of the Resurrection – the tomb of Hetman Kyrylo Razumovsky in the historic center of Baturyn. Designed by an unknown architect, the building is rectangular in shape, one story, and made from brick. The building has been used as a church-parish school and kindergarten. In 2005, it was accepted on the balance of the Reserve “Hetman's Capital”. The monument was restored in 2005-2008.

== Museum History ==
The museum was opened on January 22, 2009, the Day of the Unification of Ukraine, by President Viktor Yushchenko.

== Exposition ==
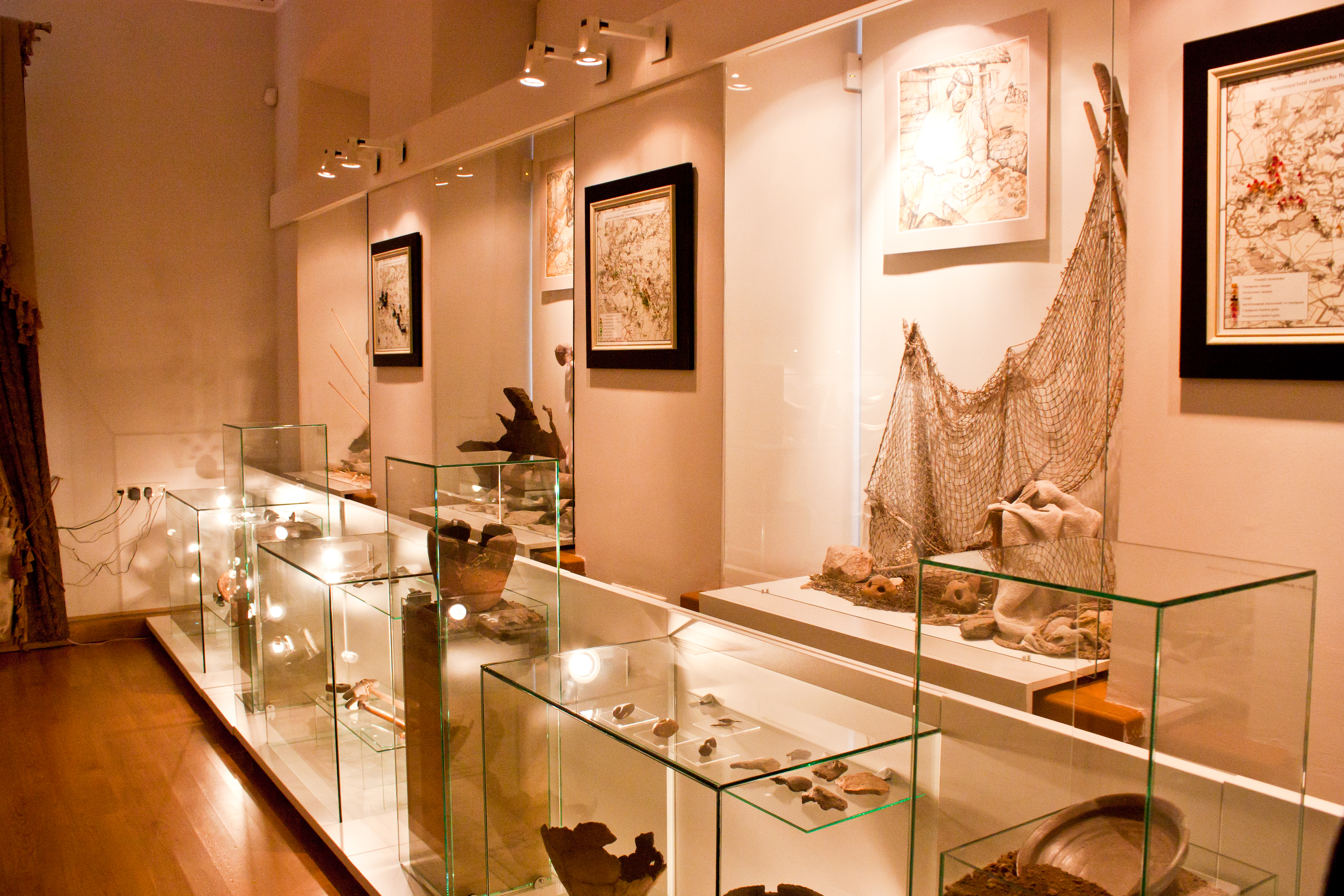
Museum exposition.

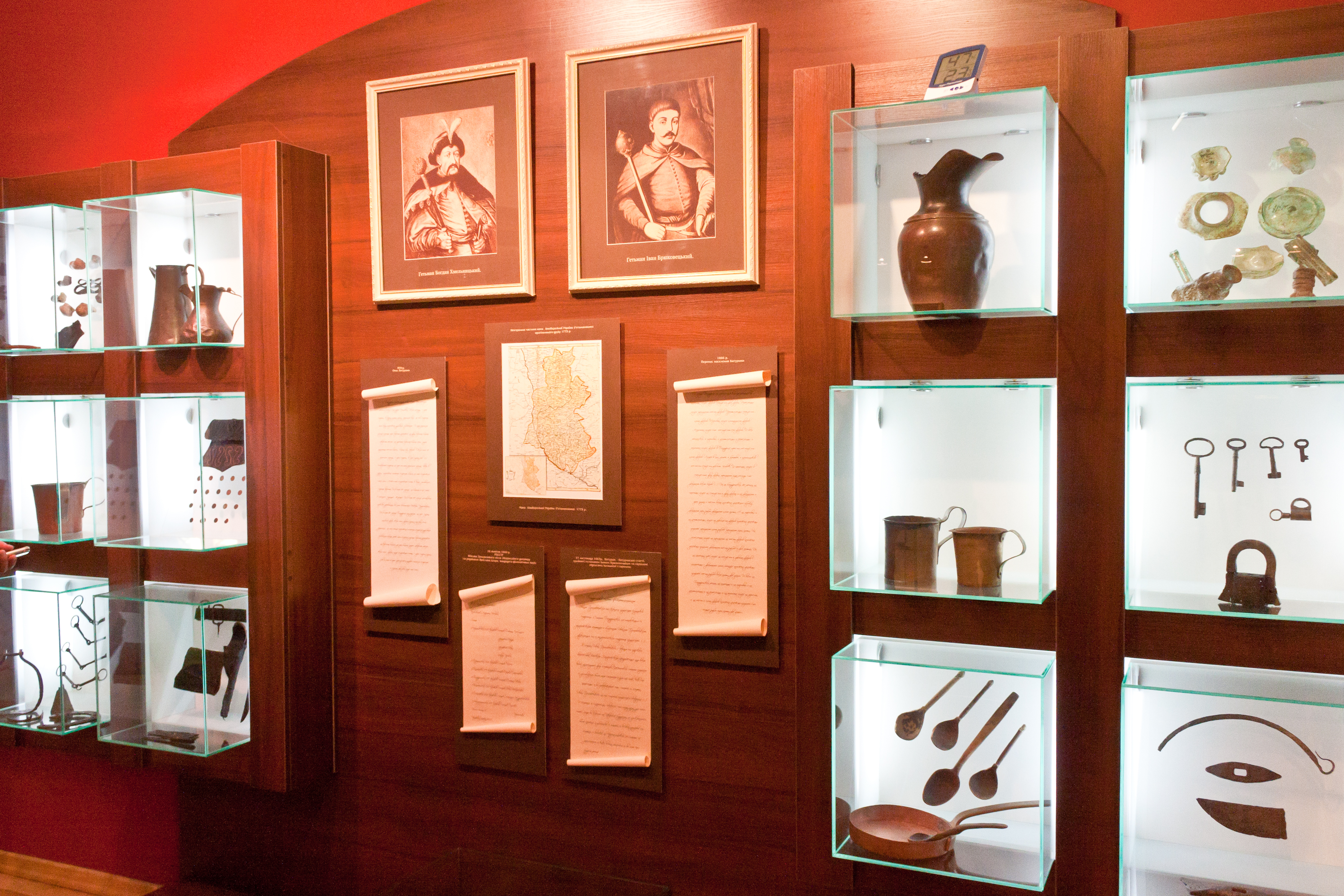
Artifacts of Cossacks on exposition.

The museum covers the period of time from the appearance of the first people in Baturyn to the death of the city on November 2 (13), 1708. The museum collection has three thematic directions: “Ancient Baturyn”, “Baturyn of the Cossack era”, “Baturyn – the Hetman's residence”.

In the hall “Ancient Baturyn” the bones of mammoths and other ancient animals 10 thousand years old are exhibited. Also displayed are stone tools of the Neolithic period and a large collection of jewelry from Kyivan Rus' period.

The exposition “Baturyn of the Cossack era” is devoted to the Lithuanian-Polish and Cossack periods of Baturyn's history covering the 14th century to 1669. Displayed are the products of local artisans, Cossack derivatives and household items, copies of documents and maps of the time, which comprehensively characterize the history of Baturyn in the Cossack period. Unique artifacts are a knight's belt with silver, a silver thaler from 1622, Cossack boots, insurgent weapons, and wooden logs, which are more than 300 years old, found during excavations of the moat of the Citadel of Baturyn Fortress.

The exhibit “Baturyn – Hetman's Residence” is dedicated to the Hetman's period, in the brightest historical period of Baturyn. From 1669 to 1708 the city was the residence of the Hetman of Zaporizhian Host – Demyan Ignatovych, Ivan Samoilovich and Ivan Mazepa. It was also the center of political, economic, and cultural life of the Hetmanate.

At its peak, the Hetman's Capital was completely destroyed by the Russian army under the command of O. Menshikov on November 13 (2), 1708. The personification of the tragedy of 1708 was the burnt icon of the Mother of God with the Infant on a copper plate. This artifact, which has traces of gilding by masters of the Kyiv Pechersk Lavra of the late 17th century, was found in the grave of an elderly woman with a broken skull. Eloquent witnesses of the tragedy are a fragment of a mortar cannon standing on the walls of the fortress and a fragment of a church bell. Also displayed are paintings depicting the era by Andriy Ivakhnenko and Mykola Danchenko.

Annual excavation by the museum results in new artifacts being displayed. The museum organizes temporary exhibitions and thematic classes for students and along with lectures.

== Literature ==
- Saienko N. Museum of Archeology of Baturyn. Chernigov, 2013. p. 11
