= Razumovski Palace (Baturyn) =

Palace in Ukraine

Palace of Hetman of Ukraine Kyrylo Rozumovskyi
- Палац гетьмана України Кирила Розумовського
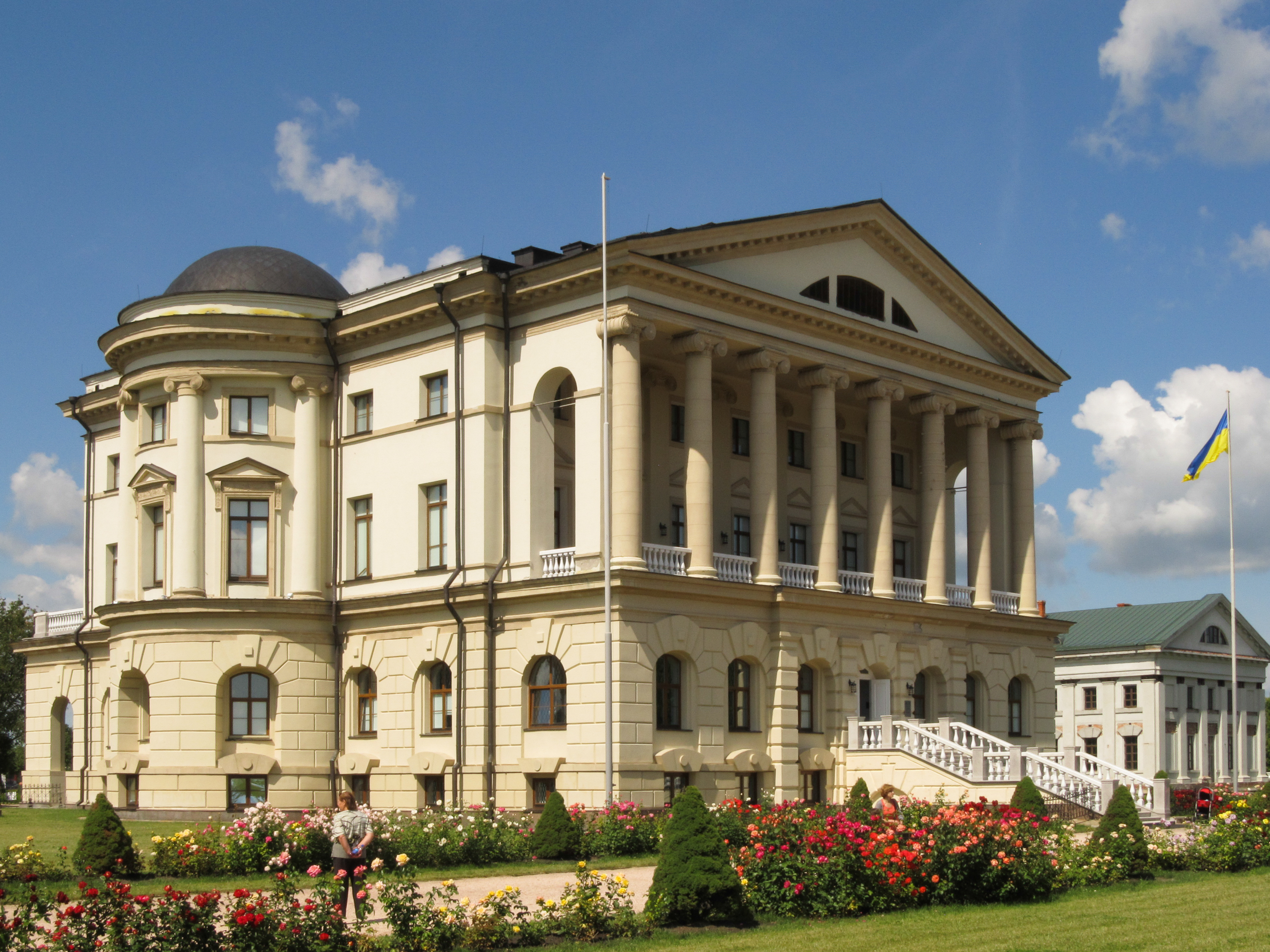

General information
- Type: Palace
- Architectural style: Neoclassicism
- Location: Baturyn, Ukraine
- Coordinates: 51.334528°N 32.893750°E
- Construction started: 1799
- Completed: 1803
- Opened: 2009

Technical details
- Floor count: 3
- Floor area: 2483 м²

Website
- baturin-capital.gov.ua

Immovable Monument of National Significance of Ukraine
- Official name: Палац К. Г. Розумовського (Palace of K. H. Rozumovskyi)
- Type: Architecture
- Reference no.: 250056

The Razumovski Palace or the Palace of Hetman of Ukraine Kyrylo Rozumovskyi (Ukrainian: Палац гетьмана України Кирила Розумовського) is an architectural monument of national importance in the city of Baturyn in Chernihiv Oblast, Ukraine. It is a museum of the National Historical and Cultural Reserve "Hetman's Capital" and the only architectural masterpiece of Charles Cameron in Ukraine.

External audio
- Audio tour ″The palace of Hetman Kyrylo Rozumovskyi″

== History ==
Kyrylo Rozumovsky was Hetman of Ukraine from 1750 to 1764. During his hetmanship the city of Baturyn became the hetman's capital. Since 1794 Kyrylo Rozumovsky lived in Baturyn. It was then that he conceived the construction of a grand palace and park ensemble. During 1799–1803, the ensemble was built according to the project of the famous architect of Scottish origin Charles Cameron. The ensemble consisted of a palace, two outbuildings and a regular planning park. After the hetman's death, in 1803 the ensemble became the property of his son Andriy Rozumovsky, who owned it until the end of his life (1836). In 1824, a fire destroyed almost all the interiors of the building. In 1856 the palace and park ensemble became state property. At the beginning of the twentieth century the ensemble had an abandoned state.

In the middle of the twentieth century the park was completely destroyed and the outbuildings were dismantled.

In 1924, a severe fire broke out there, causing significant damage to the structure. The facade of the building and the decorative ornaments on it were also seriously damaged during the Great Patriotic War.

In the second half of the twentieth century several attempts were made to restore the palace, which supported its condition but no restoration was completed. The central building of the whole complex – the palace – has survived.

In 2003–2008, under the auspices of President Victor Yushchenko and with the charitable participation of Ukrainian philanthropists, Kyrylo Rozumovsky's palace was restored. On August 22, 2009, the grand opening of the palace for visitors took place.

== Museum exposition ==
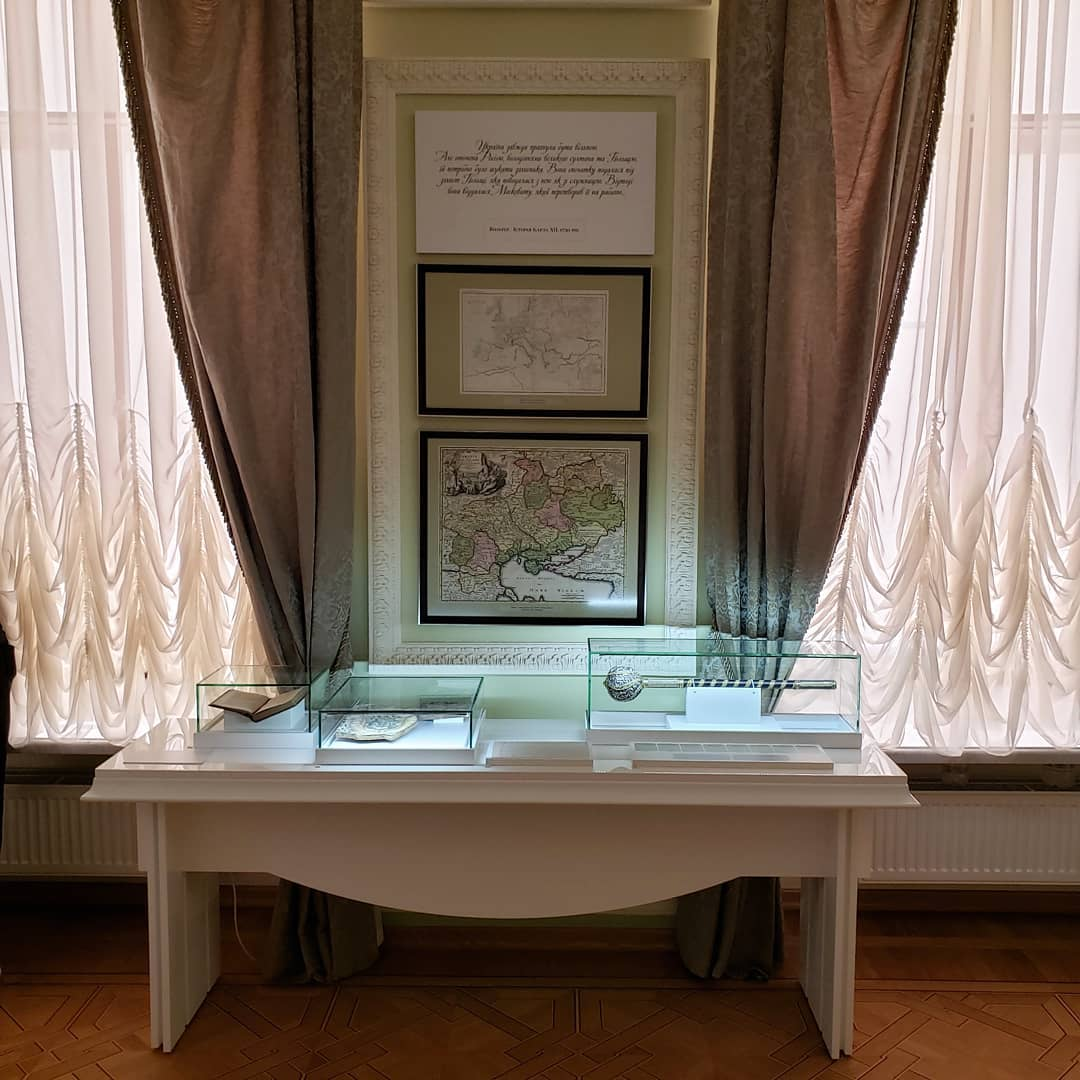
Fragment of the exposition.

The total area of the palace is 2,483 m^{2}, the exposition area is 1,065.3 m^{2}.

On the ground floor of the palace there are exhibition halls, which represent the historical past of Hetman Baturyn through the prism of state activity of Kyrylo Rozumovsky and the history of construction and restoration of the palace and park ensemble in Baturyn.

The interiors of the second floor have been restored in analogy to the surviving works of Charles Cameron. In the ceremonial halls of the second floor, the focus is on the era of the hetmanate.

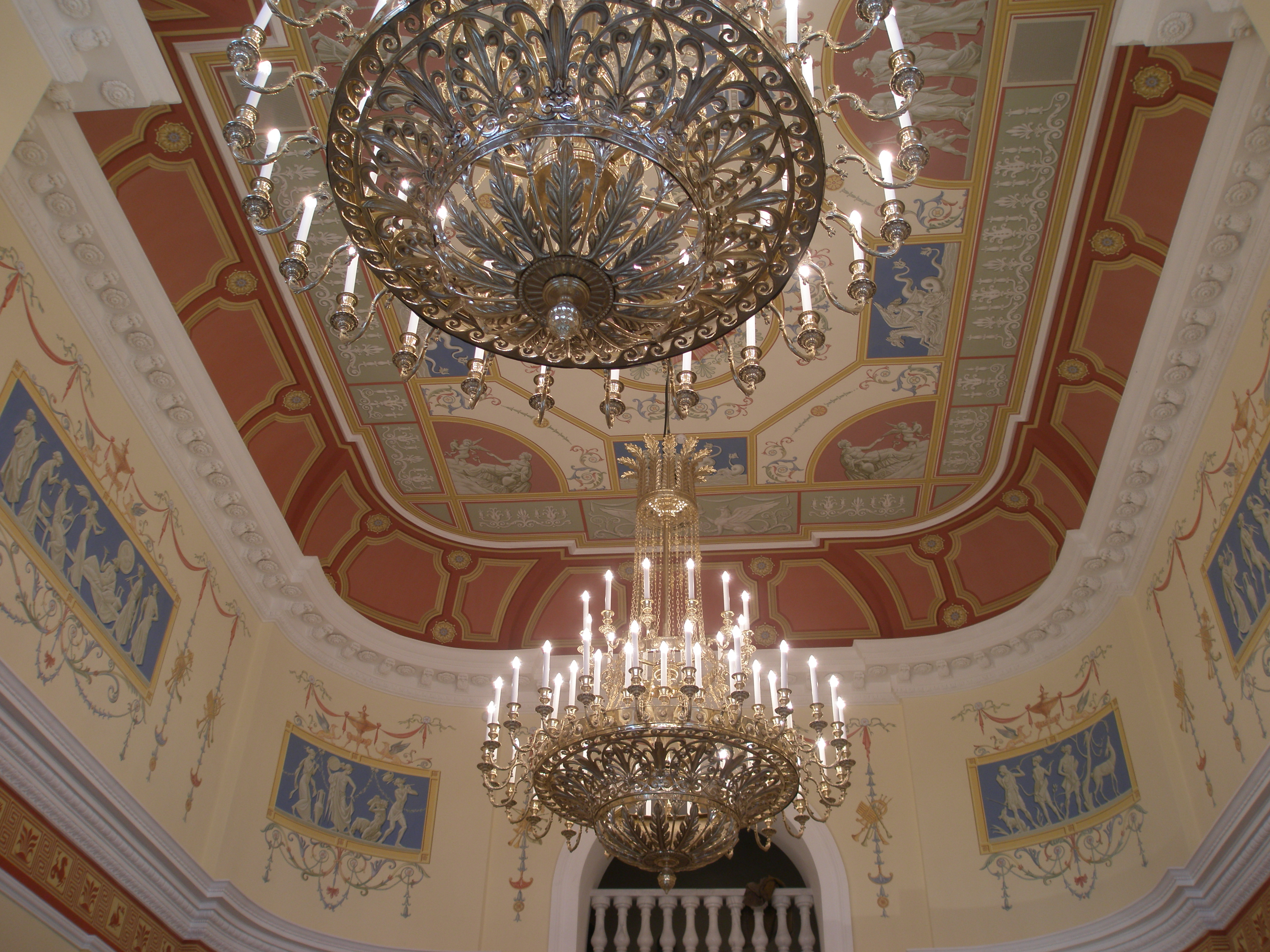
Front dining room ceilings

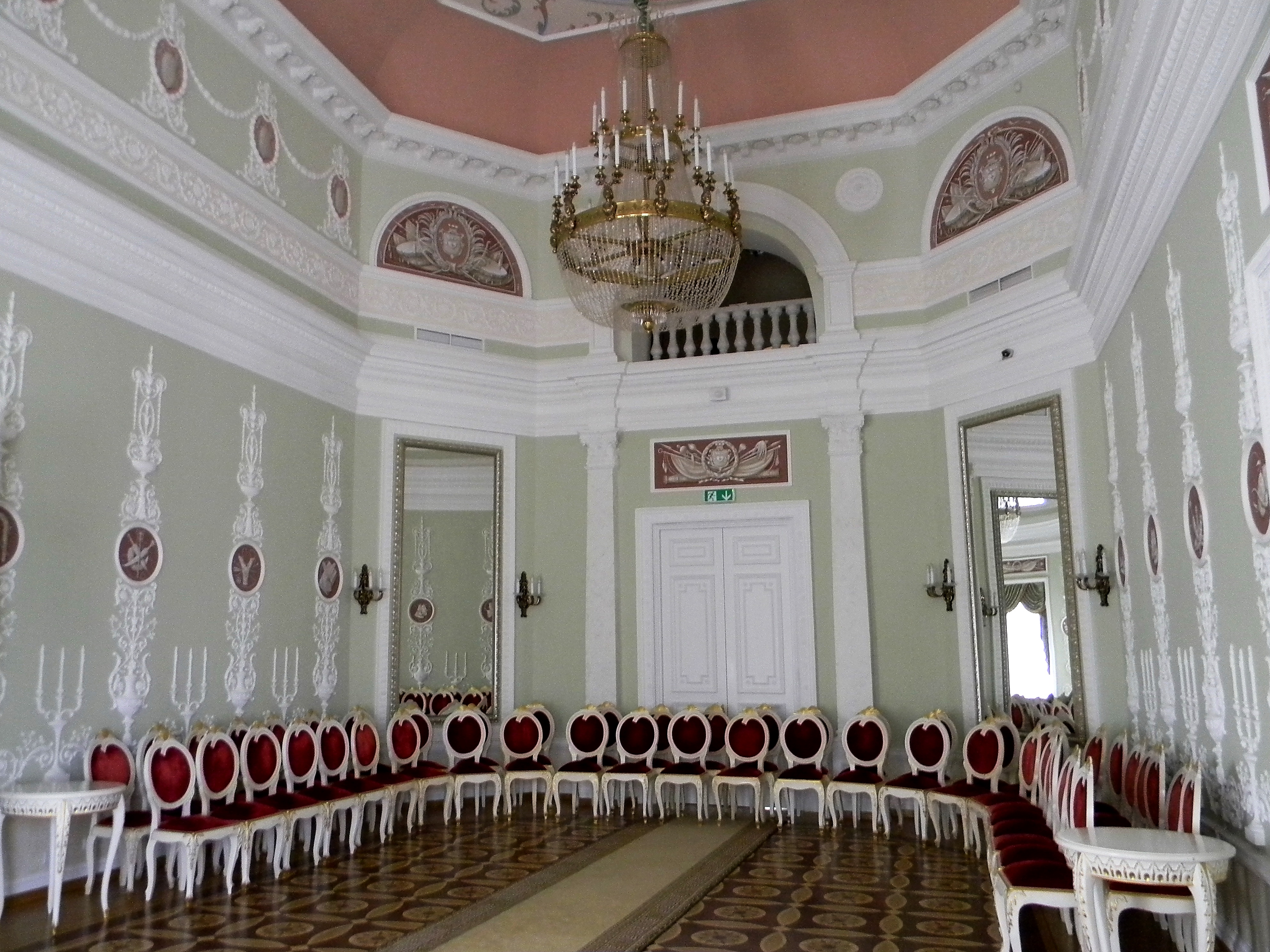
Front Hall Interior

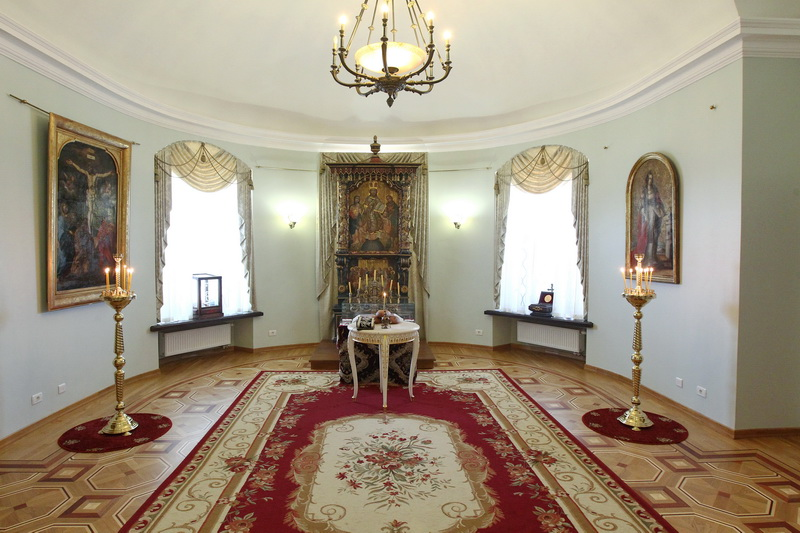
Church in the palace

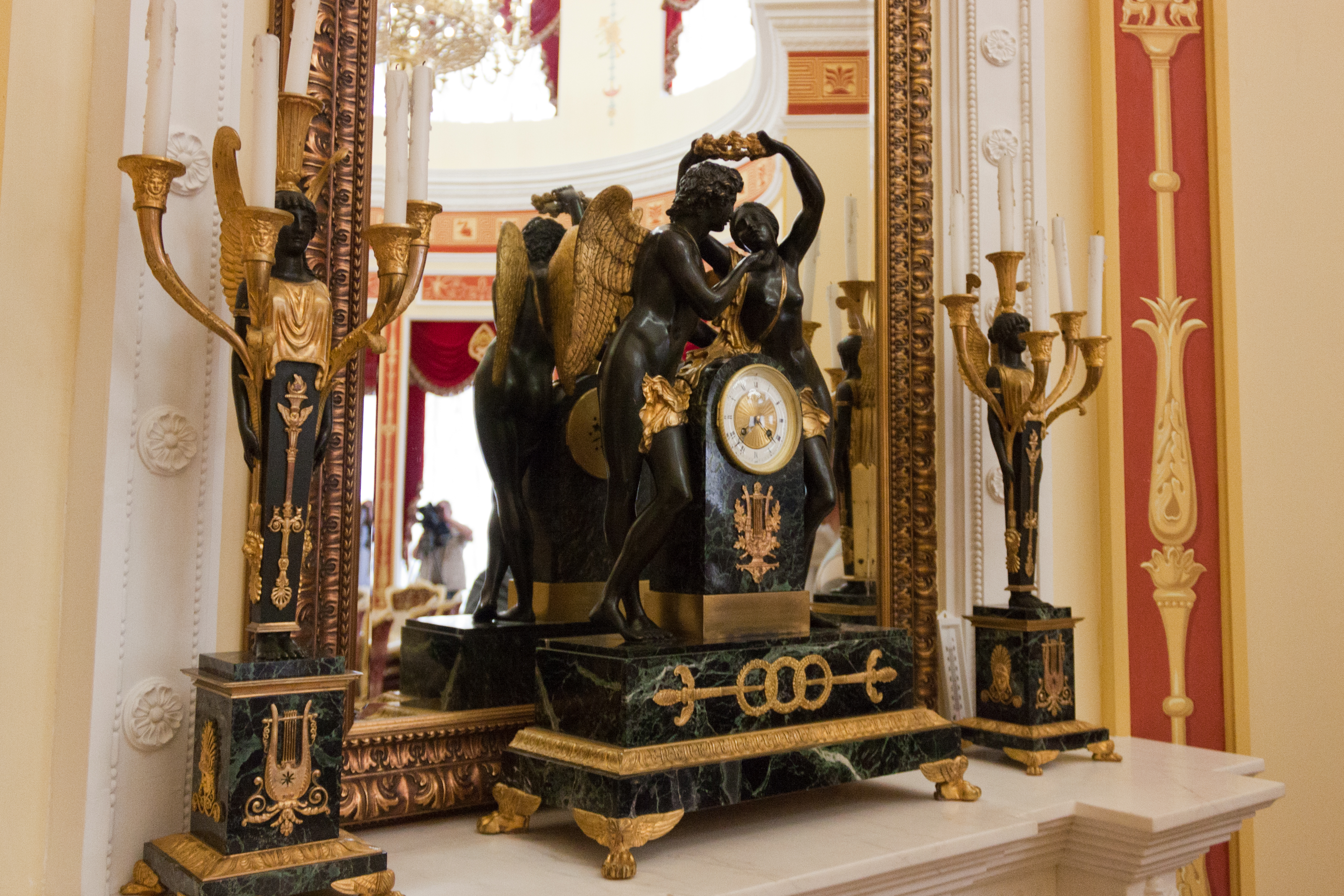
Fireplace composition

Among the original exhibits belonging to Hetman Kyrylo Rozumovsky and his family, the palace exhibits:

- Basket hilted sword, lab-company of the XVIII century, which belonged to Kyrylo Rozumovsky. The sword was kept in the Rozumowski family in Vienna. Presented by a direct descendant of Hetman Gregor Rozumovsky on the day of the grand opening of the palace on August 22, 2009.
- Seal of Kyrylo Rozumovsky's cloth factory. XVIII century.
- Fragments of the tombstone of Hetman Kyrylo Rozumovsky. Sculptor Ivan Martos. 1805.
- Universal of Hetman Kyrylo Rozumovsky on the appointment of Stefan Lukomsky as Captain Perevolochansky. October 9, 1763. Presented by a direct descendant of Hetman Gregor Rozumovsky on April 8, 2018.

== Gallery ==
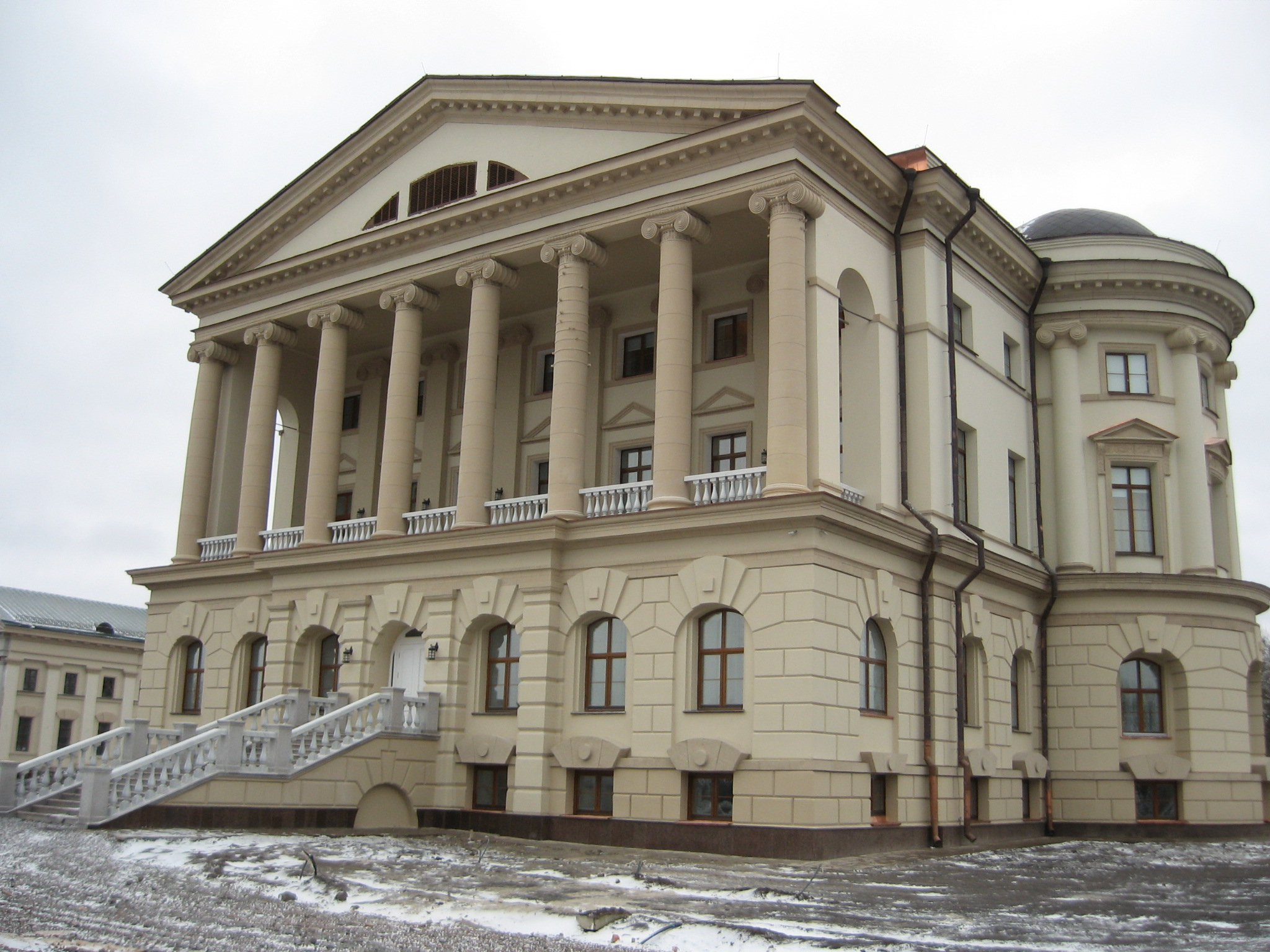

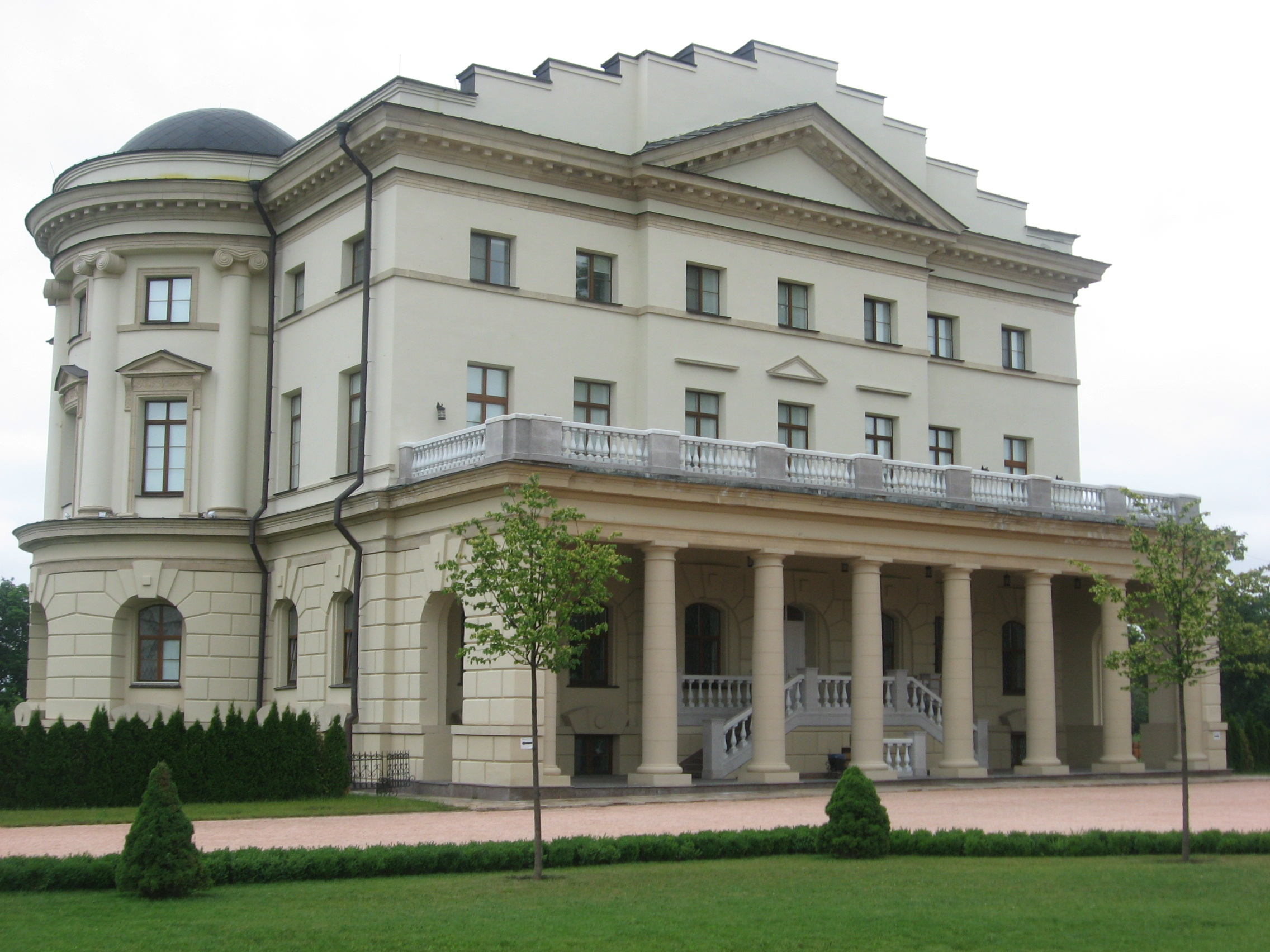

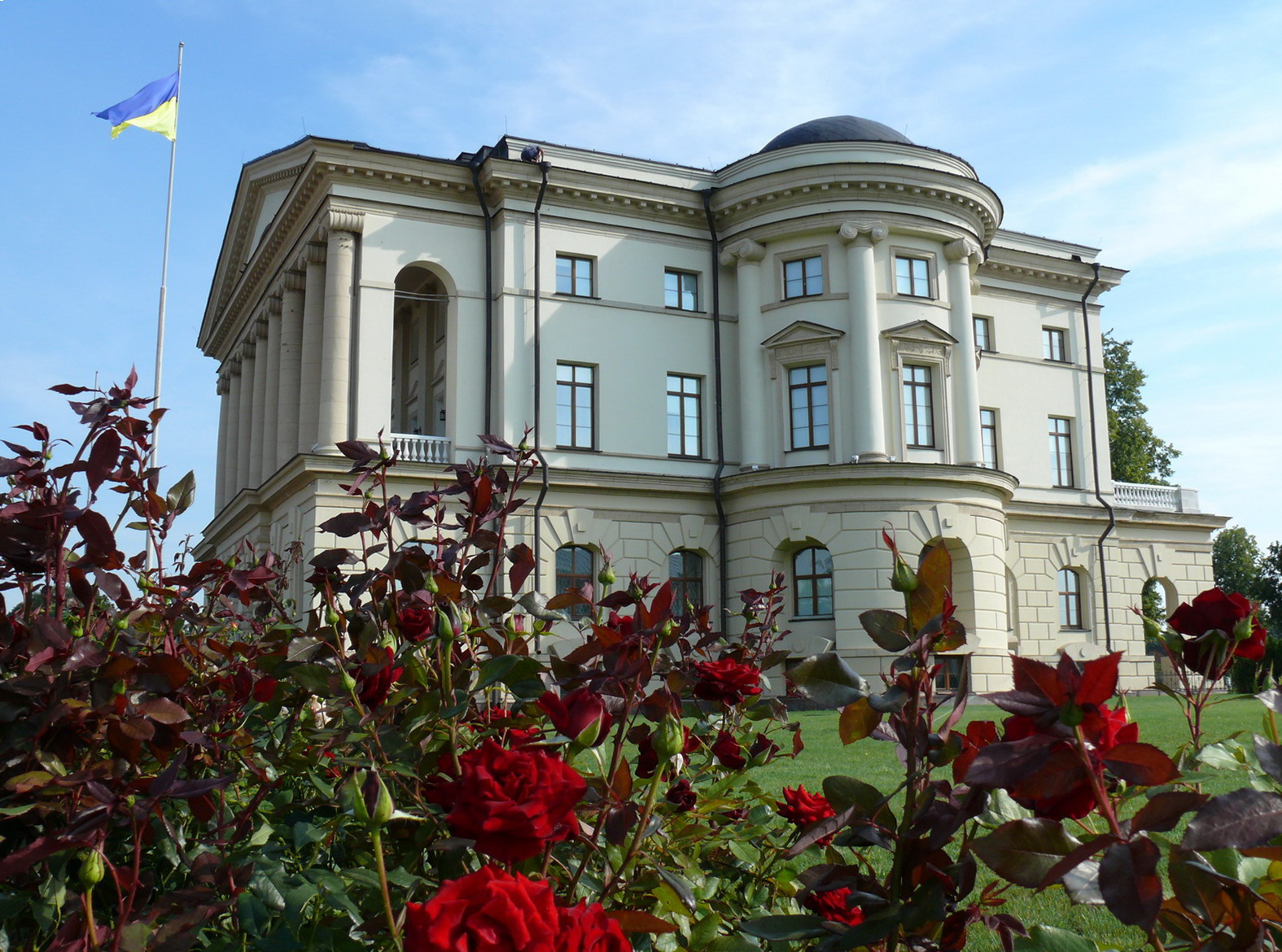

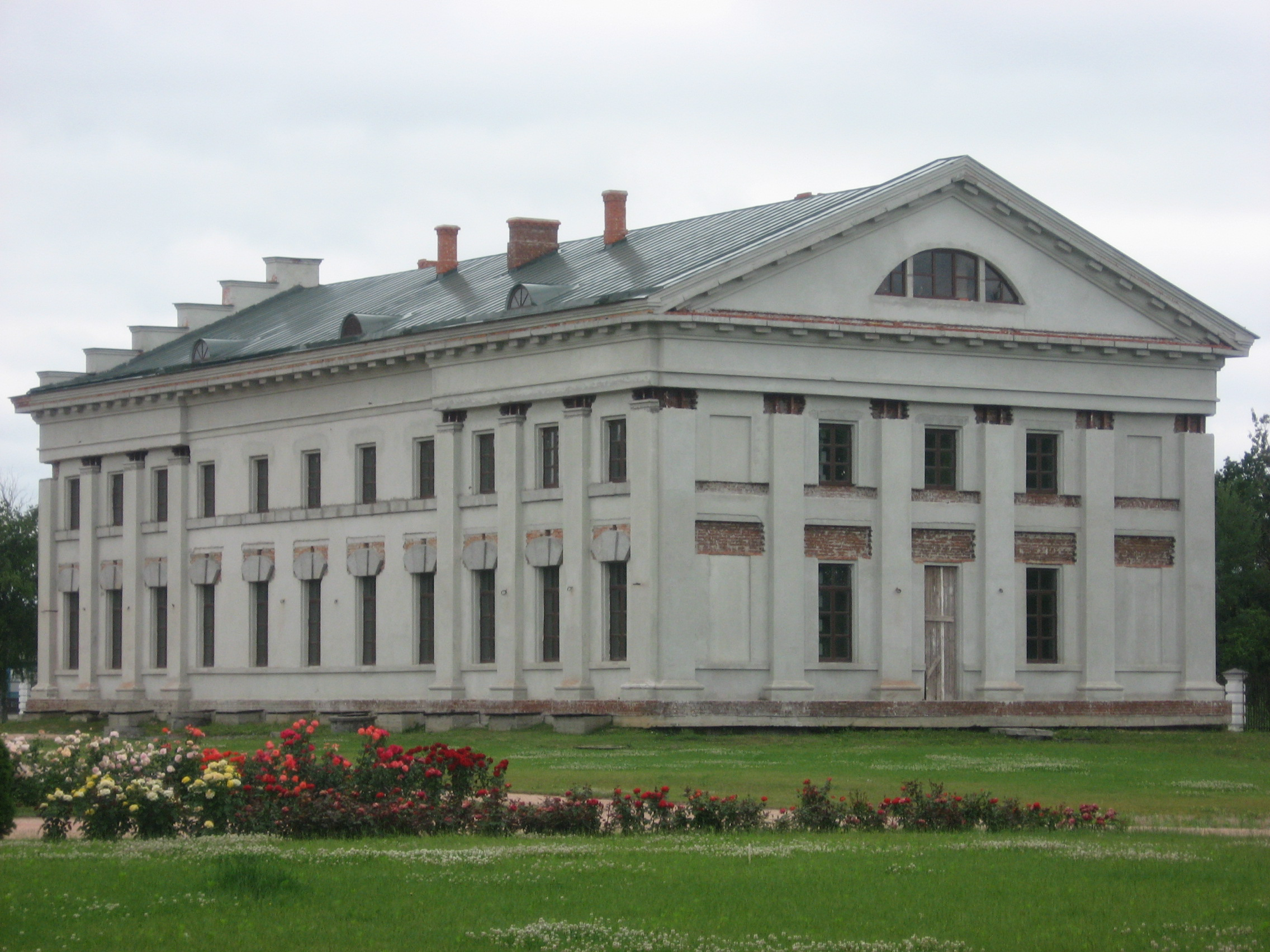

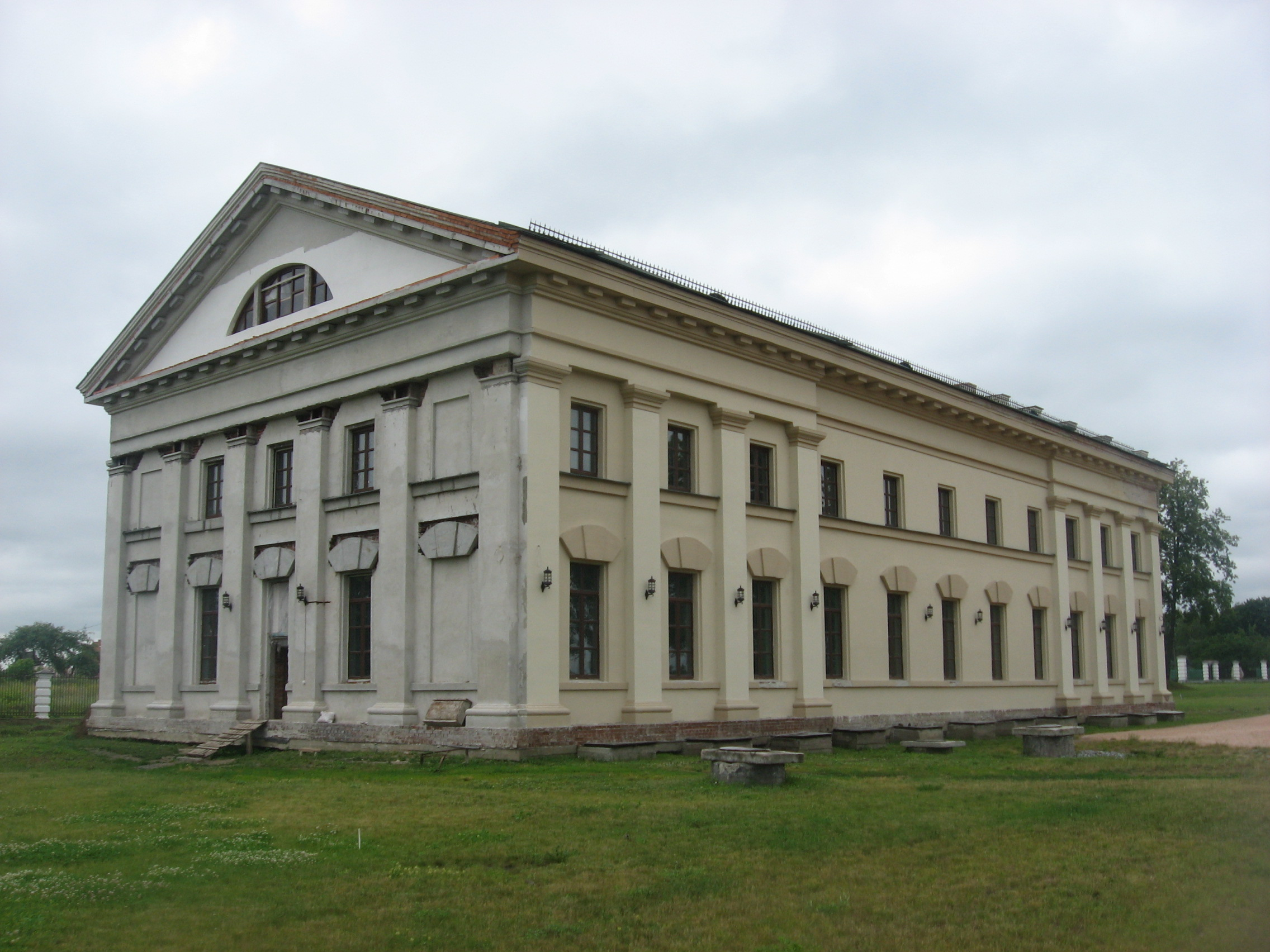
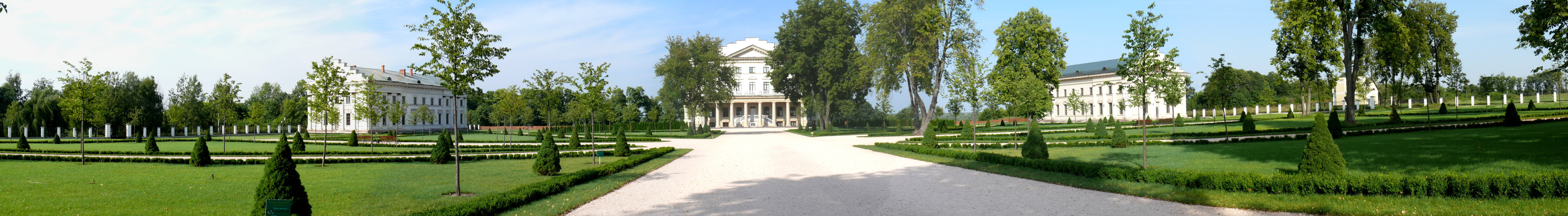
The neo-Palladian palace in Baturyn, designed by Andrey Kvasov and rebuilt by Charles Cameron.
