= Vasily Kochubey =

Russian-Ukrainian statesman (1640–1708)

- Василий Кочубей; Василь Кочубей
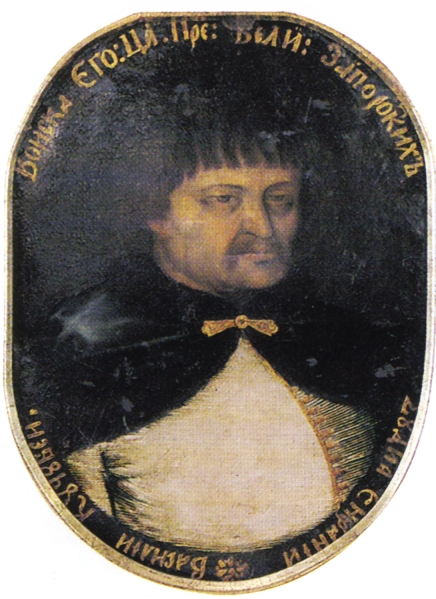
- Born: 1640
- Died: 15 July 1708 (aged 67–68); Borshchahivka
- Cause of death: Beheading
- Resting place: Kyiv Pechersk Lavra

Vasily Leontiyevich Kochubey (Russian: Василий Леонтьевич Кочубей; Ukrainian: Василь Леонтiйович Кочубей, romanized: Vasyl Leontiiovych Kochubei; c. 1640 – 15 July 1708) was a statesman of the Cossack Hetmanate of Crimean Tatar descent. His tenure was characterized by pro-Moscow policies and was cut short by his execution on Hetman Ivan Mazepa's orders. Kochubey's great-grandson was the eminent Imperial Statesman Viktor Kochubey. The family name is also spelled Kotchoubey (French) and Kotschoubey (German, Almanach de Gotha).

== Biography ==
Vasyl Kochubey was a grandson of the Crimean Tatar Kuchuk-bey, who left for Ukraine in the mid-17th century and was baptized Andrey. Until 1675 he was a military chancellor of hetmans Ivan Briukhovetsky and Petro Doroshenko In 1675 he served as Doroshenko's envoy to Turkey and in 1676 as the envoy of Archbishop Lazar Baranovych to Moscow. From 1676 to 1681 Kochubey held the post of Military Chancellor under Ivan Samoilovych. In 1681 – 1687 he was a regent of the General Military Chancellery, and also was in charge of hetman’s diplomatic relations with Moscow tsars In 1687 – 1699 Kochubey served as Secretary General, and in 1700 – 1708 as the General Judge of Zaporozhian Host.

== Denunciation of Ivan Mazepa and execution ==
The first document accusing hetman Ivan Mazepa of betrayal and secret negotiations with Poland was submitted by Kochubey to Moscow in August 1707 from Baturyn through Nykanor, a monk of the Sevsk Savior Monastery, who was interrogated in Preobrazhensky Prikaz, but at that time the case was suspended. On September 16, 1707, Nykanor reported on what he had heard from the Kochubeys to pantler, Duke Fyodor Romodanovsky. However, Peter I checked the materials of the oral denunciation only in December 1707 and even after that he did not take it into account and did not believe the denunciation.

The next informer from the judge general was Petro Yatsenko (Yakovlev). In January 1708, in Moscow he presented the main points of the denunciation to Tsarevich Aleksei, and accused Hetman Mazepa of having relations with Polish King Stanislaw Leszczynski and attempts to arrest Peter I. On 17 February 1708 the denunciation, written from the words of Kochubey and his relative Ivan Iskra was sent to Moscow by Okhtyrka Colonel Fedor Osypov with the help of his clerk V. Kobeliatskyi. On March 1, 1708, Peter I wrote about the crime of Kochubey and Iskra to his bedchamber count Golovkin and secret secretary Shafirov, who were investigating the denunciation materials by his order. Mazepa was asked to arrest the informers.

On April 18, 1708, Kochubey and Ivan Iskra, certain of their rightness, went to Vitebsk, where at that time the Tsar's Campaign Chancellery was located. Upon arrival, they were arrested and tortured. All the details of interrogation of the suspects were thoroughly recorded in the materials of the investigation case. On 6 May 1708 the arrested were sent from Vitebsk to Smolensk. Later, they were sent from Smolensk to Kyiv by ships along the Dnipro River. On 7 July 1708 they arrived to Kyiv-Pechersk Fortress By order of I. Mazepa the informers were transported to the hetman's, camp, which was then located near the town of Borshchahivka (a village near the town of Pohrebyshche in Vinnytsia oblast). On July 14, 1708, Kochubey and Iskra were beheaded in the hetman's convoy and buried in Borshchahivka. Later they were reburied on the territory of Kyiv-Pechersk Lavra near the Refectory Church where a memorial plaque was installed.

== Family ==
- Father: Leontii Andriiovych Kochubey.
- Mother: unknown.
- Wife: Liubov Fedorivna Zhuchenko – a daughter of Fedor Ivanovych Zhuchenko, Poltava Colonel.
- Sons:

Vasyl Vasyliovych Kochubey (1680–1743) – Poltava Colonel (1727–1743)
Fedir Vasyliovych Kochubey (? – 1729) – Bunchukovyi tovarysh.

- Daughters:

Hanna Vasylivna Kochubey (? – ?) – wife of Ivan Pavlovych Obydovskyi, Nizhyn Colonel (1676 – 1701), nephew of Hetman Ivan Mazepa. Two sons were born in their family.
Mariia Vasylivna Kochubey (? – ?) – wife of Vasyl Stepanovych Zabila - son of Nizhyn Colonel.
Motrya Vasylivna Kochubey (1688 – 1736)- was a goddaughter of Hetman Ivan Mazepa. She was married to Semen Chuikevych (born in 1674) – Nizhyn regimental judge.
Paraska Vasylivna Kochubey (? -1726) – wife of Bunchukovyi tovarysh FedirSulyma, brother of Semen Sulyma; 5 daughters were born in their family.

== Memories ==
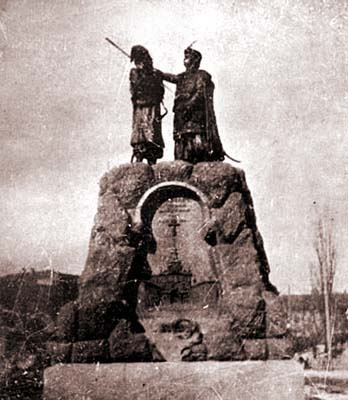
Iskra and Kochubey monument in Kyiv

After the transition of Ivan Mazepa to the side of the Swedes, Kochubey was celebrated as a martyr for the truth and a hero in the Russian Empire. His conflict with Mazepa, allegedly caused by the hetman's romantic relationship with Kochubey's daughter Maria, is one of the central points of the poem Poltava by Alexander Pushkin. A monument to Vasyl Kochubey and Ivan Iskra was erected in Kyiv in 1914, on the foundation of which a monument to the workers of the Arsenal plant has stood since 1923. The house, which belonged to Judge General Vasyl Kochubey, has survived in Baturyn, Chernihiv oblast. It houses the museum of the National Historical and Cultural Reserve "Hetman's Capital".
