= Kochubey family =

Kochubey
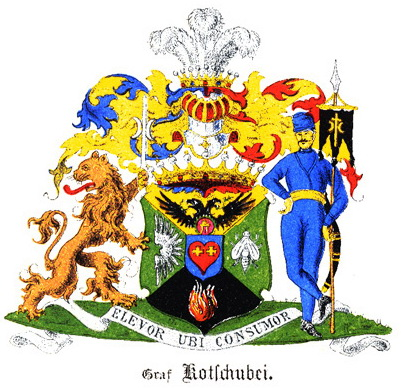
- Kochubey coat of arms
- Members: Vasyl Kochubey
- Connected families: Skoropadsky; Apostol; Lyzohub; Bezborodko; Skarzhinsky

The House of Kochubey was originally a Ukrainian noble family of Crimean Tatar origin, later becoming Russian princely family.

== History ==
Members of the family held significant positions in the Cossack Hetmanate and later in the Russian Empire. Over the years many representatives of the family held high government positions. On 6 December 1831 the family was awarded with the title Prince in the Russian Empire by Nicholas I of Russia.

== Notable family members ==
- Vasyl Kochubey (1640 - 1708), Chancellor of Zaporizhian Host, Judge General in Cossack Hetmanate
- Viktor Kochubey (1768-1834), a Russian minister of foreign affairs and minister of interior

== See also ==
- Skoropadsky family
