= Tolstoye, Belgorod Oblast =

Tolstoye Толстое
- Selo
- Location within Belgorod Oblast Location within Russia
- Coordinates: 50°59′N 37°15′E
- Country: Russia
- Region: Belgorod Oblast
- District: Gubkinsky District
- Time zone: UTC+3:00

Tolstoye (Russian: Толстое) is a rural locality (a selo) and the administrative center of Tolstyanskaya Territorial Administration, Gubkinsky District, Belgorod Oblast, Russia. The population was 626 as of 2010. There are 8 streets.

== Geography ==
Tolstoye is located 50 km southwest of Gubkin (the district's administrative centre) by road. Kochki is the nearest rural locality.
