= Zagorny =

Zagorny Загорный
- Settlement
- Location within Belgorod Oblast Location within Russia
- Coordinates: 51°11′N 37°36′E
- Country: Russia
- Region: Belgorod Oblast
- District: Gubkinsky District
- Time zone: UTC+3:00

Zagorny (Russian: Загорный) is a rural locality (a settlement) in Gubkinsky District, Belgorod Oblast, Russia. The population was 2 as of 2010.

== Geography ==
Zagorny is located 25 km southeast of Gubkin (the district's administrative centre) by road. Zapovedny is the nearest rural locality.
