= Nikanorovka =

Nikanorovka (Russian: Никаноровка) is the name of two rural localities in Russia:

- Nikanorovka, Belgorod Oblast, a village in Nikanorovskaya Territorial Administration, Gubkinsky District, Belgorod Oblast
- Nikanorovka, Rostov Oblast, a village in Voloshynskoye Selsoviet of Millerovsky District, Rostov Oblast
