= Yuryevka =

Yuryevka Юрьевка
- Selo
- Location within Belgorod Oblast Location within Russia
- Coordinates: 51°03′N 37°20′E
- Country: Russia
- Region: Belgorod Oblast
- District: Gubkinsky District
- Time zone: UTC+3:00

Yuryevka (Russian: Юрьевка) is a rural locality (a selo) and the administrative center of Yuryevskaya Territorial Administration, Gubkinsky District, Belgorod Oblast, Russia. The population was 393 as of 2010. There are 8 streets.

== Geography ==
Yuryevka is located 43 km southwest of Gubkin (the district's administrative centre) by road. Ivanovka is the nearest rural locality.
