= Bobrovy Dvory =

Bobrovy Dvory Бобровы Дворы
- Selo
- Location within Belgorod Oblast Location within Russia
- Coordinates: 51°11′N 37°22′E
- Country: Russia
- Region: Belgorod Oblast
- District: Gubkinsky District
- Time zone: UTC+3:00

Bobrovy Dvory (Russian: Бобровы Дворы) is a rural locality (a selo) and the administrative center of Bobrodvorskaya Territorial Administration, Gubkinsky District, Belgorod Oblast, Russia. The population was 1,332 as of 2010. There are 13 streets.

== Geography ==
Bobrovy Dvory is located 19 km southwest of Gubkin (the district's administrative centre) by road. Shorstovo is the nearest rural locality.
