= Seym (river) =

River in Russia and Ukraine

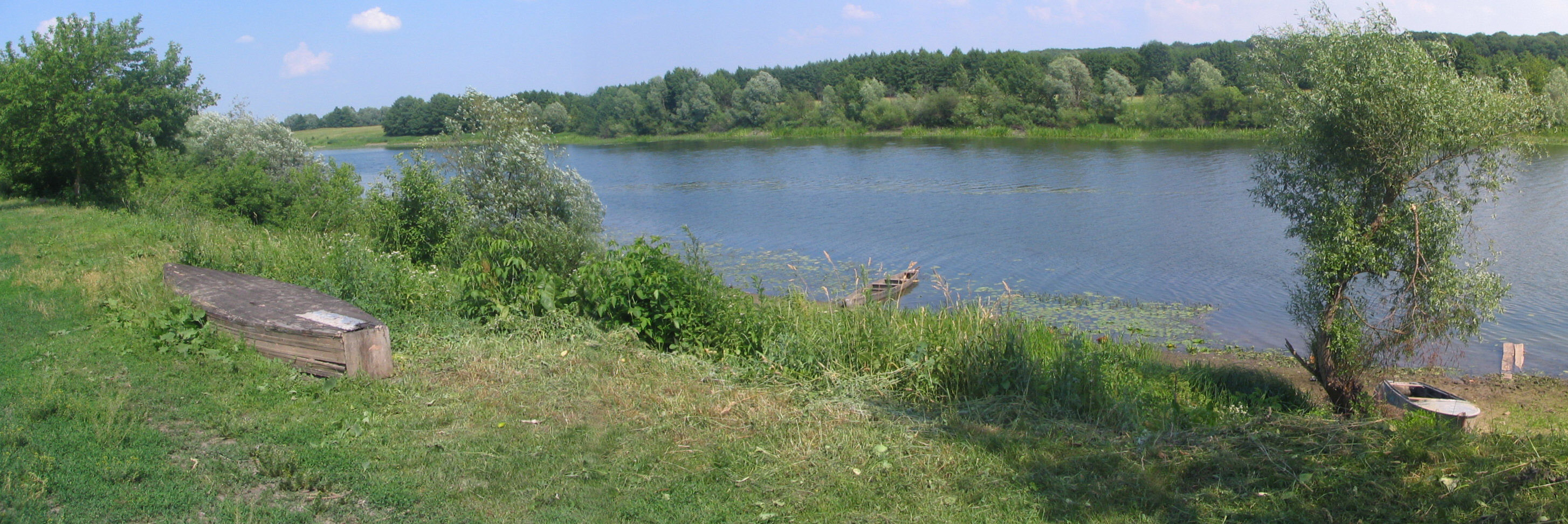
- Seym at Bupel in Kursk Oblast
- Native name: Сейм

Location
- Regions: Russia: Belgorod, Kursk; Ukraine: Sumy, Chernihiv

Physical characteristics
- Source: near Morozovo
  - coordinates: 51°09′50″N 37°13′58″E
- Mouth: Desna
  - coordinates: 51°27′34″N 32°33′50″E
- Length: 748 km (465 mi)
- Basin size: 27,500 km^{2} (10,600 sq mi)
- Discharge
  - average: 99.6 m³/s

Basin features
- Progression: Desna→ Dnieper→ Dnieper–Bug estuary→ Black Sea
- Tributaries
  - left: Reut, Vyr
  - right: Tuskar, Svapa, Kleven

The Seym or Seim (Russian: Сейм; Ukrainian: Сейм) is a river that flows westward in Russia and Ukraine. It is 748 kilometres (465 mi) long (250 km within Ukraine) and its basin area about 27,500 square kilometres (10,600 sq mi). It is the largest tributary of the Desna.

Places on the river include Kursk, Kurchatov, Rylsk, Glushkovo, Putyvl, Baturyn, and the junction with the Desna, which continues west and south past Chernihiv to Kyiv.

In September 2024, during the Russian invasion of Ukraine, Ukrainian officials accused Russia of polluting the river by dumping sewage from a sugar factory in Tyotkino, Kursk Oblast, resulting in environmental damage estimated at Hr 186 million ($4.5 million) in Chernihiv Oblast that included a decrease in oxygen levels and fish kills downstream.

The river also serves cooling water for the Kursk Nuclear Power Plant in Russia.
