= Morozovo =

Morozovo Морозово
- Selo
- Location within Belgorod Oblast Location within Russia
- Coordinates: 51°10′N 37°12′E
- Country: Russia
- Region: Belgorod Oblast
- District: Gubkinsky District
- Time zone: UTC+3:00

Morozovo (Russian: Морозово) is a rural locality (a selo) in Gubkinsky District, Belgorod Oblast, Russia. The population was 565 as of 2010. There are 7 streets.

== Geography ==
Morozovo is located 41 km southwest of Gubkin (the district's administrative centre) by road. Nikanorovka is the nearest rural locality.
