= Nikanorovka, Belgorod Oblast =

Nikanorovka Никаноровка
- Selo
- Location within Belgorod Oblast Location within Russia
- Coordinates: 51°11′N 37°10′E
- Country: Russia
- Region: Belgorod Oblast
- District: Gubkinsky District
- Time zone: UTC+3:00

Nikanorovka (Russian: Никаноровка) is a rural locality (a selo) and the administrative center of Nikanorovskaya Territorial Administration, Gubkinsky District, Belgorod Oblast, Russia. The population was 1,012 as of 2010.

== Geography ==
Nikanorovka is located 44 km southwest of Gubkin (the district's administrative centre) by road. Kretov-Pervy is the nearest rural locality. There are 7 streets.
