= Sack of Baturyn =

1708 raid during the Russian-Swedish war

Coordinates: 51°20′N 32°52′E

- Part of the Great Northern War
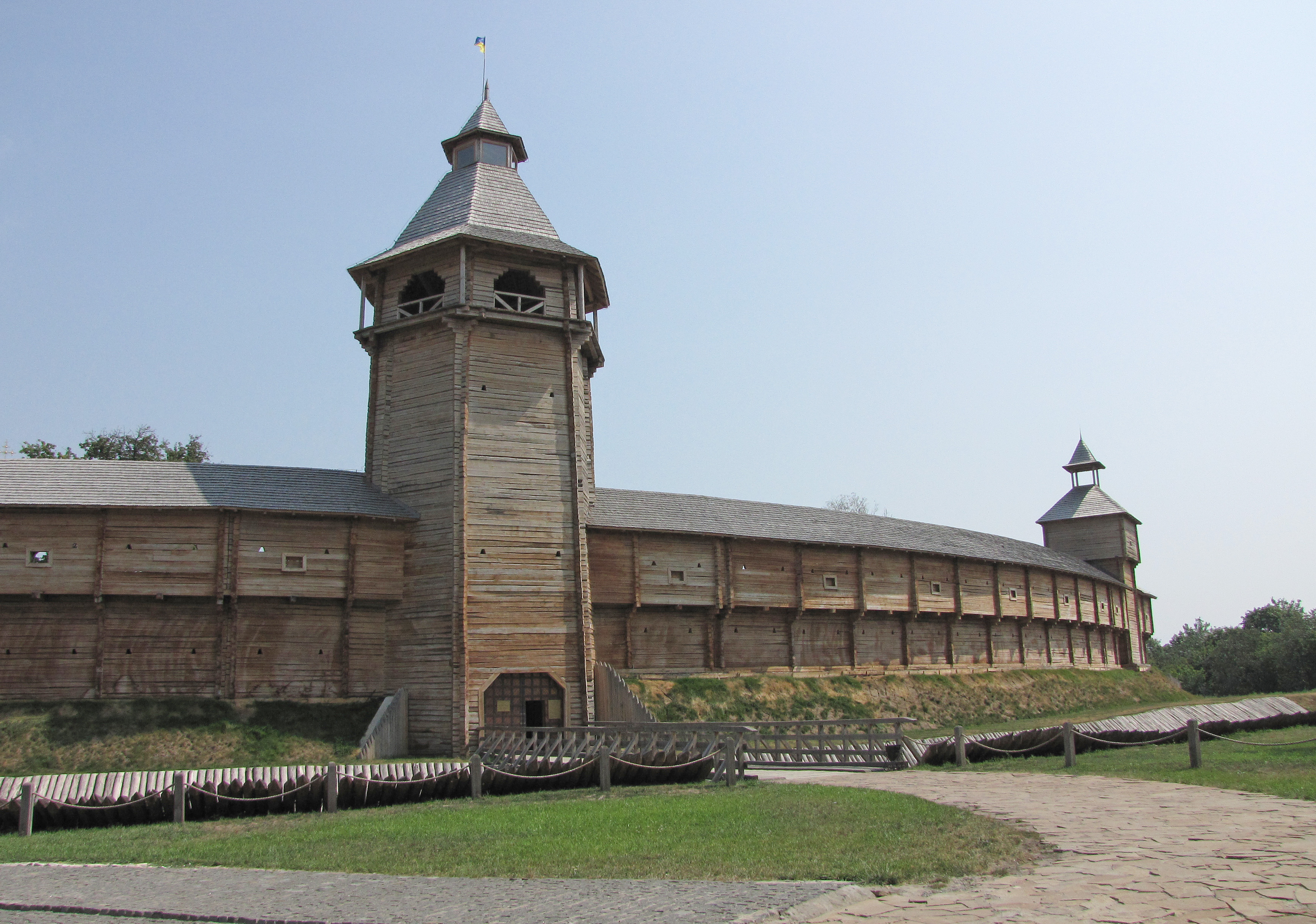
- Reconstruction of the Baturyn Citadel
- Native name: Батуринська трагедія
- Location: Baturyn, Cossack Hetmanate
- Date: 27 October – 2 November 1708 (O.S.); 7–13 November 1708 (N.S.)
- Target: Rebel Cossacks and civilians
- Attack type: Siege
- Deaths: 9,000~15,000
- Perpetrator: (Tsardom of Russia) Russian Tsarist Army

The sack of Baturyn, or the Baturyn tragedy (Ukrainian: Батуринська трагедія) was the 1708 seizure of the city of Baturyn and its Fortress during the Great Northern War (1700–1721), by Russian troops under the command of Alexander Danilovich Menshikov. They captured and destroyed Baturyn on 2 November 1708 O.S. (13 November 1708 N.S.). The fortress of Baturyn was the capital of the Cossack Hetmanate at the time of Ivan Mazepa. According to various estimates, between 9,000 and 15,000 civilians and defenders of Baturyn were killed.

== Background ==
During the Great Northern War (1700–1721) progress, Hetman Mazepa ceased to consider himself loyal to Tsar Peter I and on 7 November (28 October) 1708, when Charles XII was on his way to Moscow and forced to divert his forces toward Central Ukraine, Mazepa joined the Swedish advance. He was followed by about 3000 Cossacks and leading members of the Zaporozhian Army.

Upon learning of Mazepa's desertion to the Swedish side, Peter I ordered General Alexander Menshikov to destroy the Hetmanate's capital.

That decision of Tsar Peter must be considered within the context of the Great Northern War between Russia and Sweden. In October 1708, Charles XII was caught far away from his winter quarters. His army did not have sufficient provisions and missed ammunition because one month earlier Russian troops had captured a Swedish ammunition convoy led by Adam Ludwig Lewenhauptduring the Battle of Lesnaya. That convoy was heading to the army of Charles XII. Mazepa suggested to Charles that Baturyn was a good place to recover. The Baturyn fortress had enough food and ammunition to replenish Charles' army during the winter of 1708–1709.

Hence Tsar Peter's decision was triggered by three factors: 1) prohibiting the replenishment of Charles' army in Baturyn; 2) intimidation of the Cossaсk Hetmanate population to prevent its support of Mazepa; 3) personal revenge for Mazepa's desertion.

Alexander Menshikov had very limited time to capture Baturyn before the arrival of Charles' army. Some sources mention that Menshikov had just two weeks' advantage. Menshikov suggested that Baturyn's defenders surrender, but they refused. Menshikov then started the assault on the Baturyn fortress.

== Course of the sack ==
Menshikov, on the eve of the storming of Baturyn, commanded 20 dragoon regiments, numbering from 15 to 20 thousand dragoons. But at that time Baturyn was a fortress, armed with a large number of guns. In view of this, Menshikov tried to persuade the defenders of the fortress to surrender, but the Baturyns not only rejected the offer of capitulation, but also responded with cannon shots at Menshikov's positions. The Russian Army failed to storm the fortified city, and only after penetrating through a secret raid did the twice-superior forces of Menshikov gain the advantage and at 6 o'clock in the morning, 13 (2) November 1708, entered Baturyn territory and attacked the defenders of the fortress. Despite fierce opposition from the garrison, within two hours, the Russian troops completed the capture of the city. When Hetman Mazepa later saw the consequences of the Baturyn massacre in Moscow, "this spectacle struck him in the heart"; Mazepa wept zealously for Baturyn, watching how much human blood in the city and suburbs was full of puddles.

== Description of events in documentary sources ==
The bloody events in Baturyn are confirmed by many documentary sources.

Mykola Markevich (1804–1860) wrote:

Serdyuks were partly cut out, partly tied in one crowd with ropes. Revenge for yesterday, Menshikov instructed the executioners to execute them with various executions; the army, everywhere and always ready for plunder, was scattered in the homes of the common people, and, without dismantling the innocent from the guilty, exterminated civilians, spared neither women nor children. "The most common death was to quarter the living, wheel them and put them on a stake, and then new kinds of torment were invented, it is the imagination that terrifies.

Alexander Rigelman (1720–1789) described the events as follows:

Menshikov received the city, people are all devoted to the sword, both in the fortress and in the suburbs, without remnants, not sparing even infants, not only the old.

According to the French historian Jean-Benoit Scherer (1741–1824):

The city was taken and looted. What the soldiers could not take with them was the prey of the fire, which devoured even part of the city. The fortifications were completely destroyed, and the inhabitants of the city died, subjected to the most brutal torture: some were put on stilts, others were hanged or quartered.

== Archaeological research in Baturyn ==
Archaeological excavations in Baturyn have been conducted by Ukrainian researchers since 1995. In 2001, Canadian scientists joined them.

In 2005, the Baturyn Foundation was founded by President Victor Yushchenko and supported by several Canadian charities and academic organizations. That same year, 150 students and scientists from the Universities of Chernihiv and Nizhyn and the Kyiv-Mohyla Academy took part in the excavations, and the following year 120 students and scientists from universities and museums-reserves of Kyiv, Chernihiv, Hlukhiv, Rivne, Baturyn and the University of Graz (Austria).

In 1996–2007, archaeologists discovered 138 burials in Baturyn from the time of the reign of Mazepa, 65 of them belonging to those killed during the capture of Baturyn (mostly women, children and the elderly). Thus, in 17 of the 33 graves excavated in 2005, the skeletons of women and children were buried without a coffin or visible signs of Christian rites.

== Reburial of the victims ==
On 14 November 2008, as part of the anniversary of the Baturyn tragedy, the first reburial of the remains of Baturyn casualties and civilians took place in the crypt of the Resurrection Church, on the territory of the Baturyn Fortress Citadel Memorial Complex. In 2010, in honor of the anniversary of the Baturyn tragedy, reburial was also carried out with the remains of defenders and civilians found during regular archeological excavations in Baturyn. In November 2013, during the commemoration of the anniversary of the Baturyn tragedy, the remains of people discovered during archeological expeditions on the territory of Baturyn were reburied in 2012–2013. Today, more than 500 remains of defenders and civilians resting in 74 coffins have found their eternal peace in the crypt of the church.

== Significance of events ==
The "Baturyn Tragedy" is the official name of the events in Baturyn, which was established by the Cabinet of Ministers of Ukraine on 2 April 2008. President Victor Yushchenko has stated: "For me, the Baturyn tragedy is associated with the Holodomor of the 1930s, and it is immoral that there is still no monument to the innocent victims."

On 21 November 2007, the President of Ukraine signed the Decree "On Some Issues of Development of the National Historical and Cultural Reserve" Hetman's Capital "and the Village of Baturyn", which provides for the construction in 2008 of the Memorial Complex in memory of victims of Baturyn.

On 13 November 2008, the Verkhovna Rada of Ukraine observed a minute of silence in memory of the victims of the Baturyn tragedy. Since 2018, the Day of Remembrance of the Baturyn Tragedy (2 November 1708) has been commemorated at the state level in Ukraine.

== See also ==
- Abolition of the Cossack system in Sloboda Ukraine
- Baturyn Fortress Citadel
- Baturyn Museum of Archeology
- Hetman's Capital
- Liquidation of the autonomy of the Cossack Hetmanate
- Liquidation of the Zaporozhian Sich

== Bibliography ==
- Pavlenko, S. "Perishing of Baturyn on 2 November 1708". "Ukrainska vydavnycha spilka". Kyiv, 2007.
- Pavlenko, S. "Ivan Mazepa". "Alternatyvy". Kyiv, 2003.
- Plokhy, Serhii (2022). The Gates of Europe: A History of Ukraine. New York, NY: Basic Books. p. 414. ISBN 978-0-465-07394-8.
- Tairova-Yakovleva, Tatiana (2007). Mazepa (in Russian). Moscow: Molodaya gvardiya.
- Tairova-Yakovleva, Tatiana (2020). Ivan Mazepa and the Russian Empire (PDF). Montreal Kingston London Chicago: McGill-Queen's Press. p. 425. ISBN 978-0-2280-0309-0.
