= Gubkinsky Urban Okrug, Belgorod Oblast =

Gubkinsky Urban Okrug (Russian: Гу́бкинский городско́й о́круг) is a municipal formation (an urban okrug) in Belgorod Oblast, Russia, one of the three urban okrugs in the oblast. Its territory comprises the territories of two administrative divisions of Belgorod Oblast—Gubkinsky District and the town of oblast significance of Gubkin.

It was established by the Law #137 of Belgorod Oblast of September 7, 2007 by merging the municipal formations of former Gubkinsky Municipal District into Gubkinsky Urban Okrug.
