= Baturyn urban hromada =

Coordinates: 51°19′N 32°52′E

Baturyn urban hromada Батуринська міська громада
- Hromada
- Coat of arms
- Interactive map of Baturyn urban hromada
- Country: Ukraine
- Oblast: Chernihiv
- Raion: Nizhyn

Area
  - Total: 437.5 km^{2} (168.9 sq mi)

Population (2020)
  - Total: 7,136
  - Density: 16.31/km^{2} (42.24/sq mi)
- CATOTTG code: UA74040010000076097
- Settlements: 27
- Cities: 1
- Rural settlements: 6
- Villages: 20
- Website: baturyn-rada.gov.ua

Baturyn urban hromada (Ukrainian: Батуринська міська громада) is a hromada of Ukraine, located in Nizhyn Raion, Chernihiv Oblast. Its administrative center is the city of Baturyn.

It has an area of 437.5 square kilometres (168.9 mi^{2}) and a population of 7,136, as of 2020.

== Composition ==
The hromada contains 27 settlements: 1 city (Baturyn), 20 villages:

- Bondari
- Verbivka
- Veselovka
- Horodyshche
- Karpenkove
- Krasne
- Lisova Polyana
- Matiivka
- Mytchenko
- Mosty
- Nove Polissya
- Obirky
- Obmachiv
- Osich
- Palchyki
- Pirohivka
- Slobidka
- Tasuiv
- Chasnyivka
- Shumyn

And 6 rural-type settlements: Vesele, Holubiv, Katsyri, Lopatyn, Prokhori, and Shumeikine.

== See also ==
- List of hromadas of Ukraine
