= Baturyn Fortress Citadel =

- Цитадель Батуринської фортеці
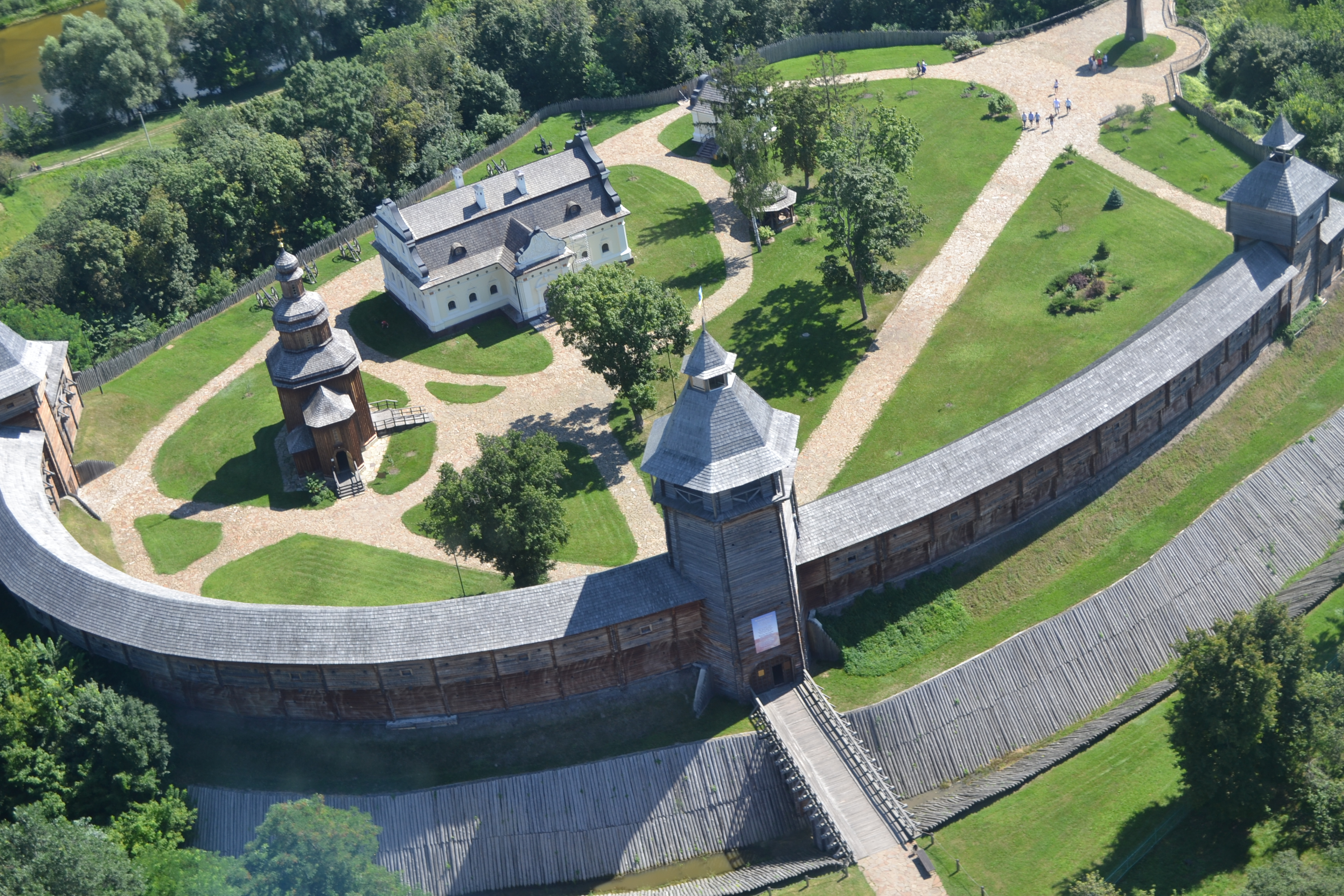
- Сitadel of Baturyn Fortress
- Established: 2008
- Location: Baturyn, Ukraine
- Coordinates: 51.3427°N 32.8868°E
- Type: Open-air museum
- Visitors: 60,000 per year
- Website: http://www.baturin-capital.gov.ua

Immovable Monument of Local Significance of Ukraine
- Official name: Поселення укріплене багатошарове «Батуринська фортеця» (Multi-layered fortified settlement "Baturyn Fortress")
- Type: Archaeology
- Reference no.: 5505-Чр

The Baturyn Fortress Citadel (Ukrainian: Цитадель Батуринської фортеці) is an architectural and memorial complex on the territory of Baturyn, it serves as a museum within the National Historical and Cultural Reserve "Hetman's Capital".

This is the only open-air archeological park in Ukraine, recreated in situ.

External audio
- Audio tour

== History ==
The Citadel of the Baturyn Fortress is one of the most important historical values of the city of Baturyn, which was the capital of Ukrainian hetmans in the 17th-18th centuries.

Since its construction in the first third of the 17th century. The citadel served as a Polish outpost, and in 1669-1708 – the official residence of Hetmans Demіan Ihnatovych, Ivan Samoilovych and Ivan Mazepa.

Archaeological research conducted on the territory of the Citadel since 1996, allowed to recreate the complex. The purpose of the reproduction is to perpetuate prominent historical figures of Ukraine and the prominent role of the city of Baturyn in the history of Ukraine.

The Citadel of the Baturyn Fortress was rebuilt in 2008 on the initiative of the President of Ukraine, Victor Yushchenko. The monuments do not claim to be authentic, they create a generalized architectural and artistic image of the Baturyn castle of the early 18th century. The project of reproduction, engineering arrangement and museumification of the Citadel objects as of 2020 has not been fully implemented.

== Memorial complex ==
The chain of dramatic events that led to the destruction of Baturyn began in 1700, when a coalition led by the Muscovite state began to compete with the Swedish Empire for dominance in Northern, Central and Eastern Europe. The Ukrainian Cossacks were to help the tsar in his war of aggression. From the very beginning of the war, the Cossacks fought on all fronts and suffered heavy losses. The economy was falling rapidly; Ukraine's human resources were catastrophically depleted, and when the war came to the territory of the Hetmanate.

In the autumn of 1708, Hetman Ivan Mazepa dared to make an alliance with the Swedish King Charles XII. In response, Russian Tsar Peter I ordered to destroy the capital Baturyn. On October 30, Peter I ordered Alexander Menshikov to capture the Baturyn fortress. At first, the 20,000-strong Moscow army failed to storm the fortified city. And only after penetrating through a secret raid did the twice-superior forces of the Moscow army gain an advantage and capture the fortress. According to historians, on November 13 (2) in early November 1708 in Baturyn was killed from 13 to 15 thousand people – soldiers, civilians (mostly women and children). After looting the city and taking everything they could take out, the victors set fire to Baturyn, the surrounding villages and hamlets.

Archaeological excavations have shown the fact that the main fighting during the storming of Baturyn took place in the Citadel and the Fortress. The real events of the past have been silenced for almost three centuries. Only with the years of Ukraine's independence did it become possible to speak and write openly about the tragedy of the Ukrainian land.

On April 10, 2004, an eleven-meter cross made of dark granite was erected on the territory of the Citadel in memory of the thousands who died in Baturyn. On the background of the stone cross – the bronze crucifix of Jesus Christ – a symbol of the crucified and resurrected Baturyn, crucified and resurrected Ukraine. On the other side of the Monument to the Victims of the Baturyn Tragedy of 1708 there is an icon of the Mother of God with the Infant, which is a symbol of Baturyn's heroic defense. The original was found during archeological excavations in the burial of a woman with a split skull – a victim of the Baturyn tragedy. The authors of the monument are architect Anatoliy Haidamaka and sculptor Mykola Obeziuk.

== Gallery ==
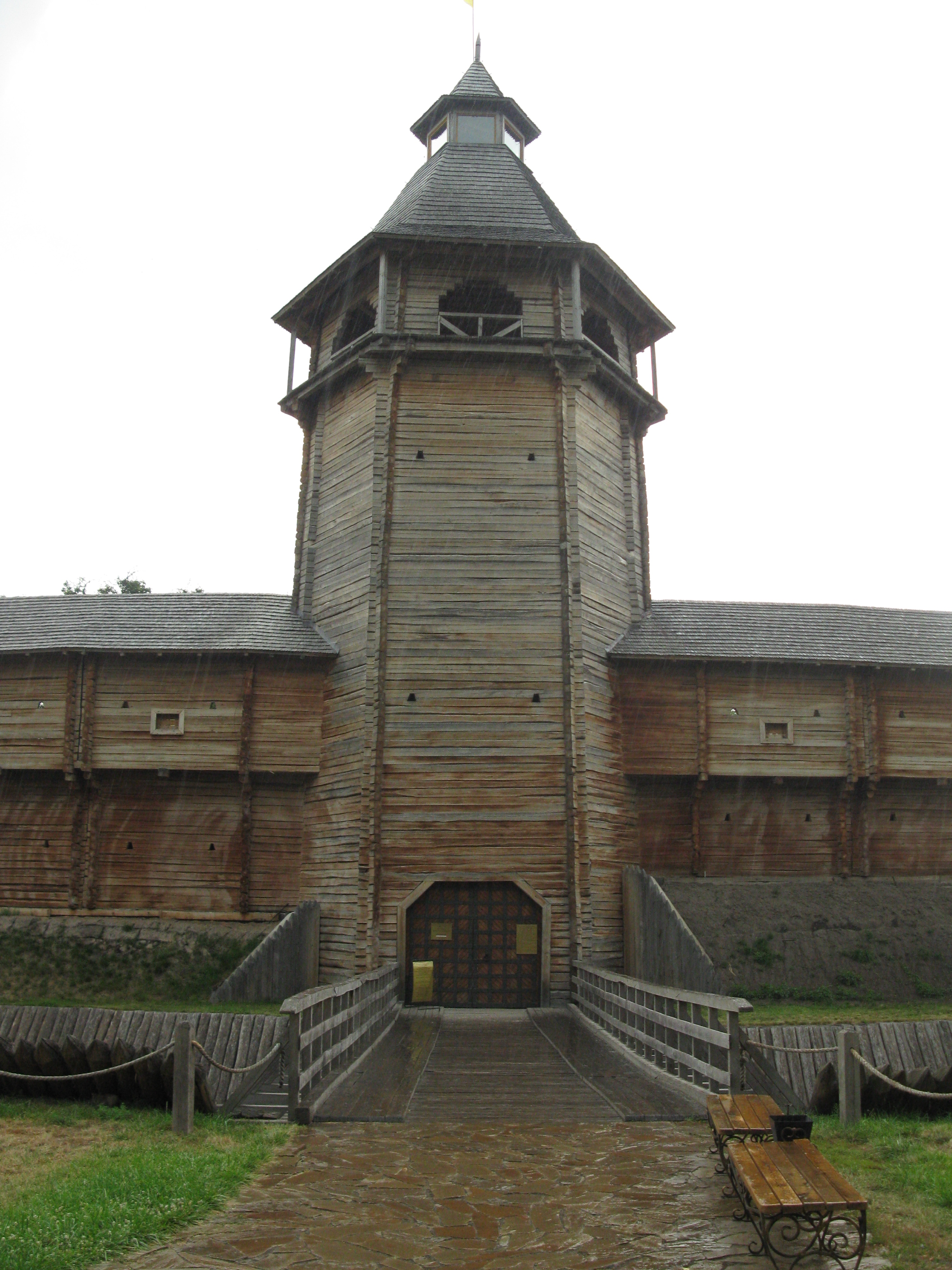
The main travel tower

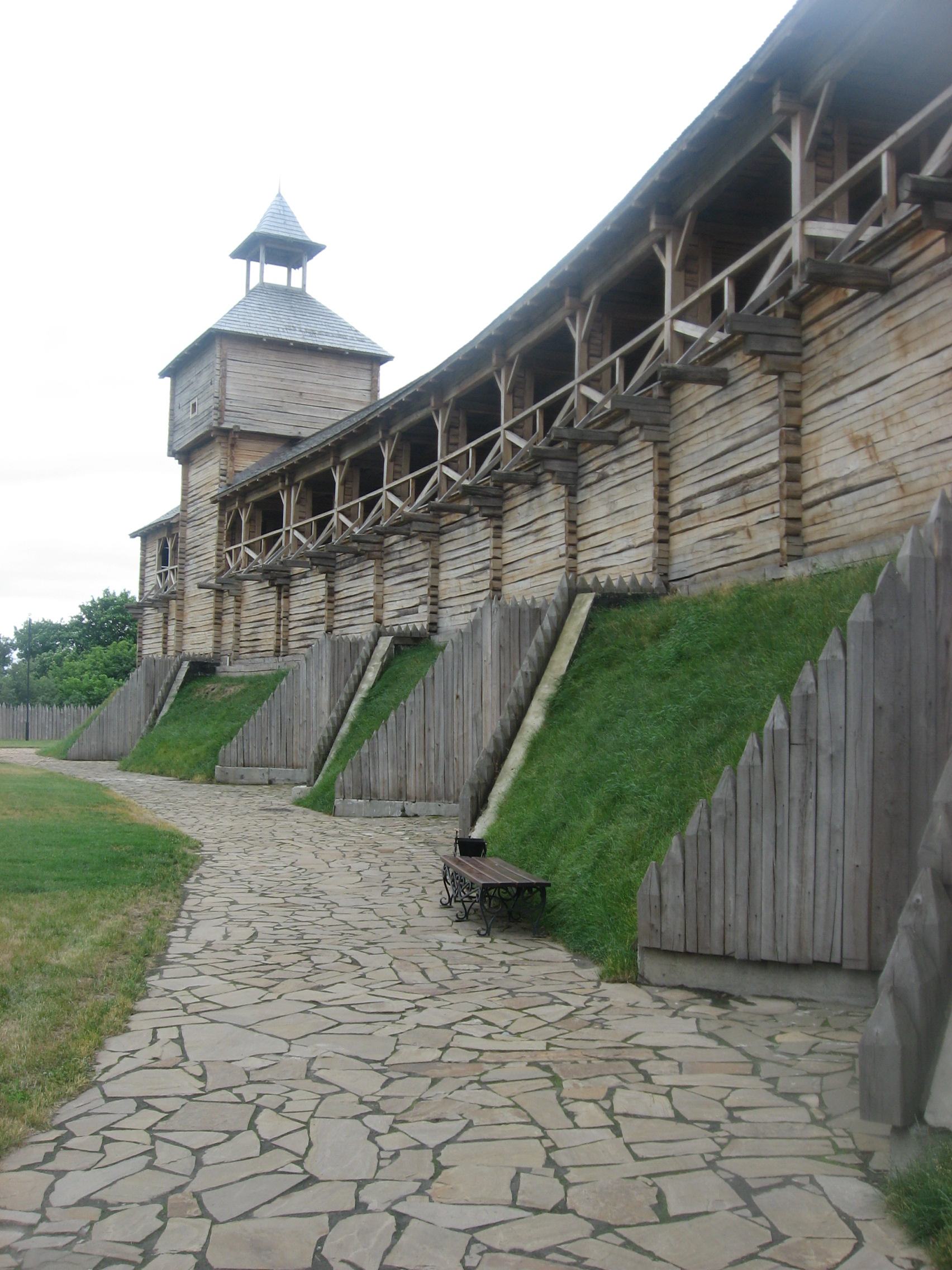
Defensive wall and south tower

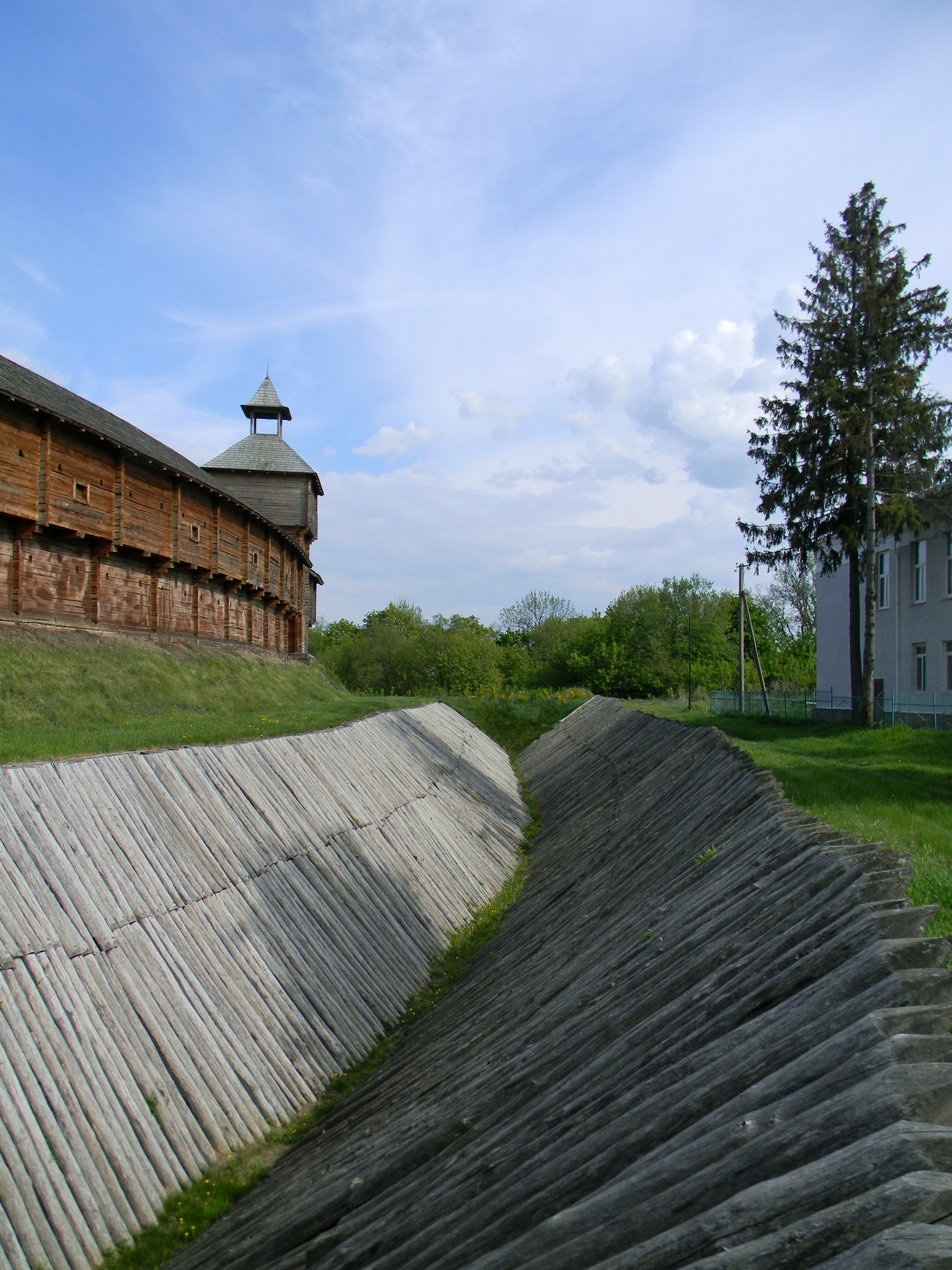
Defensive moat with fortified slopes

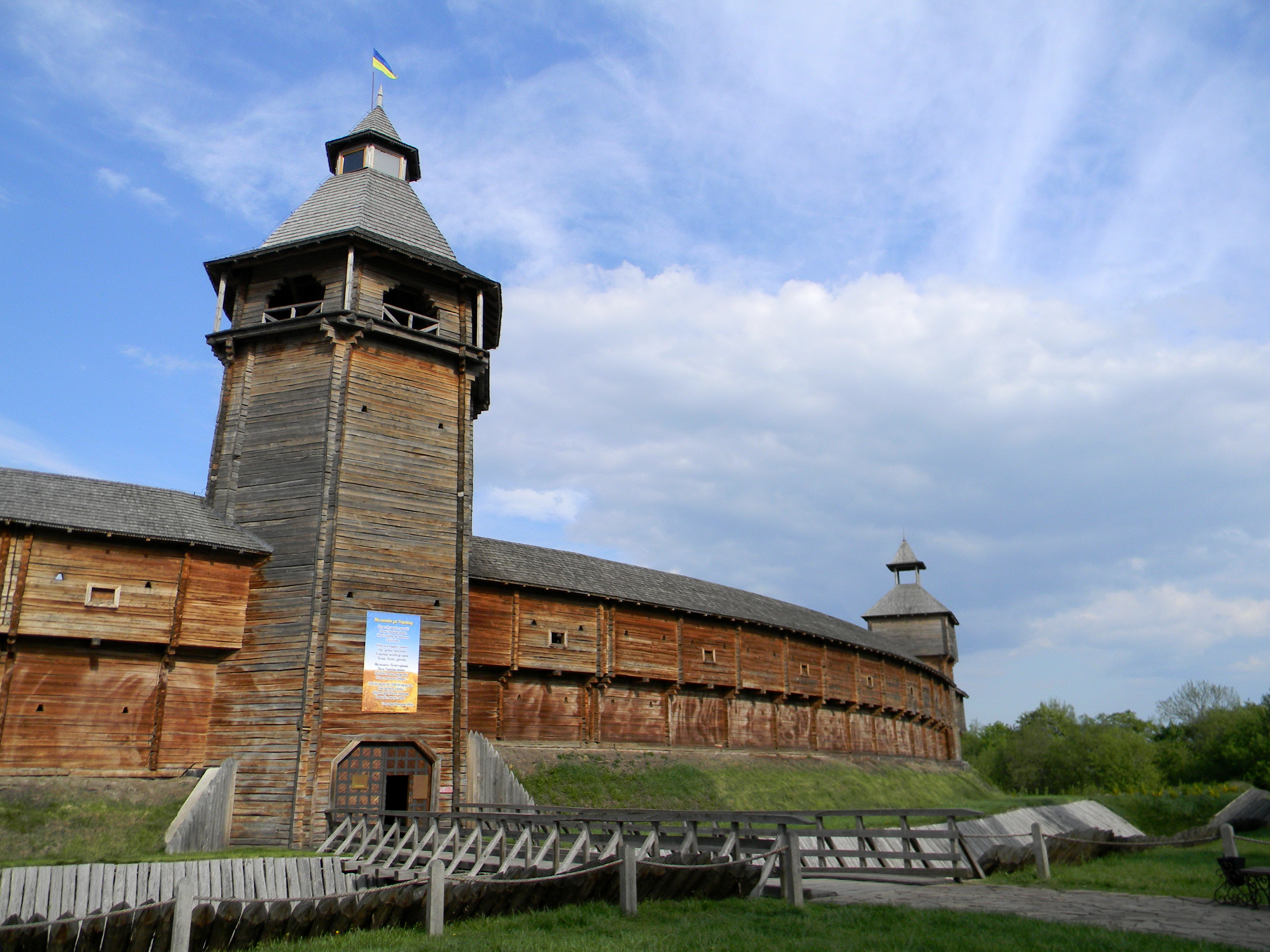
Fortifications

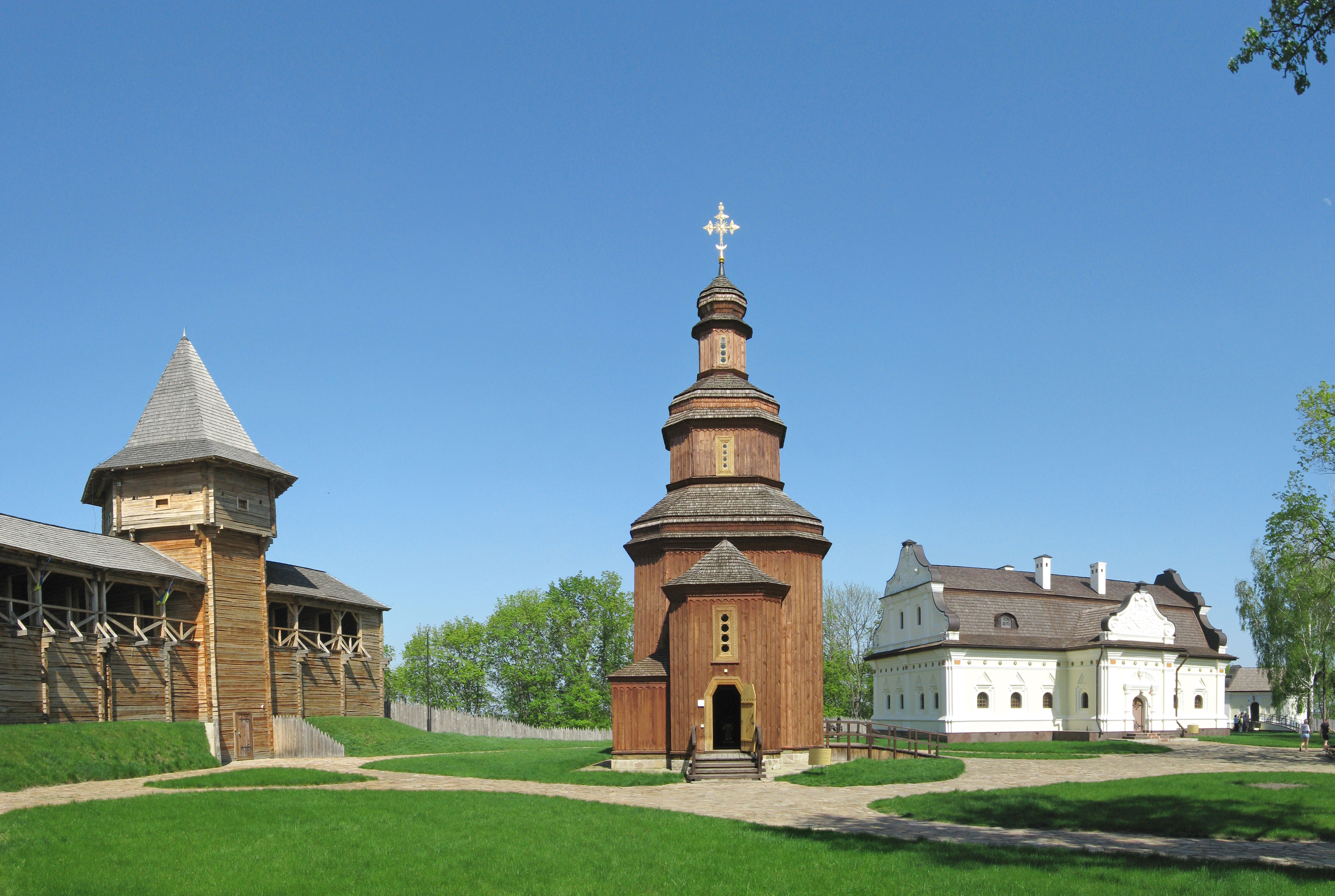
Buildings in the Citadel

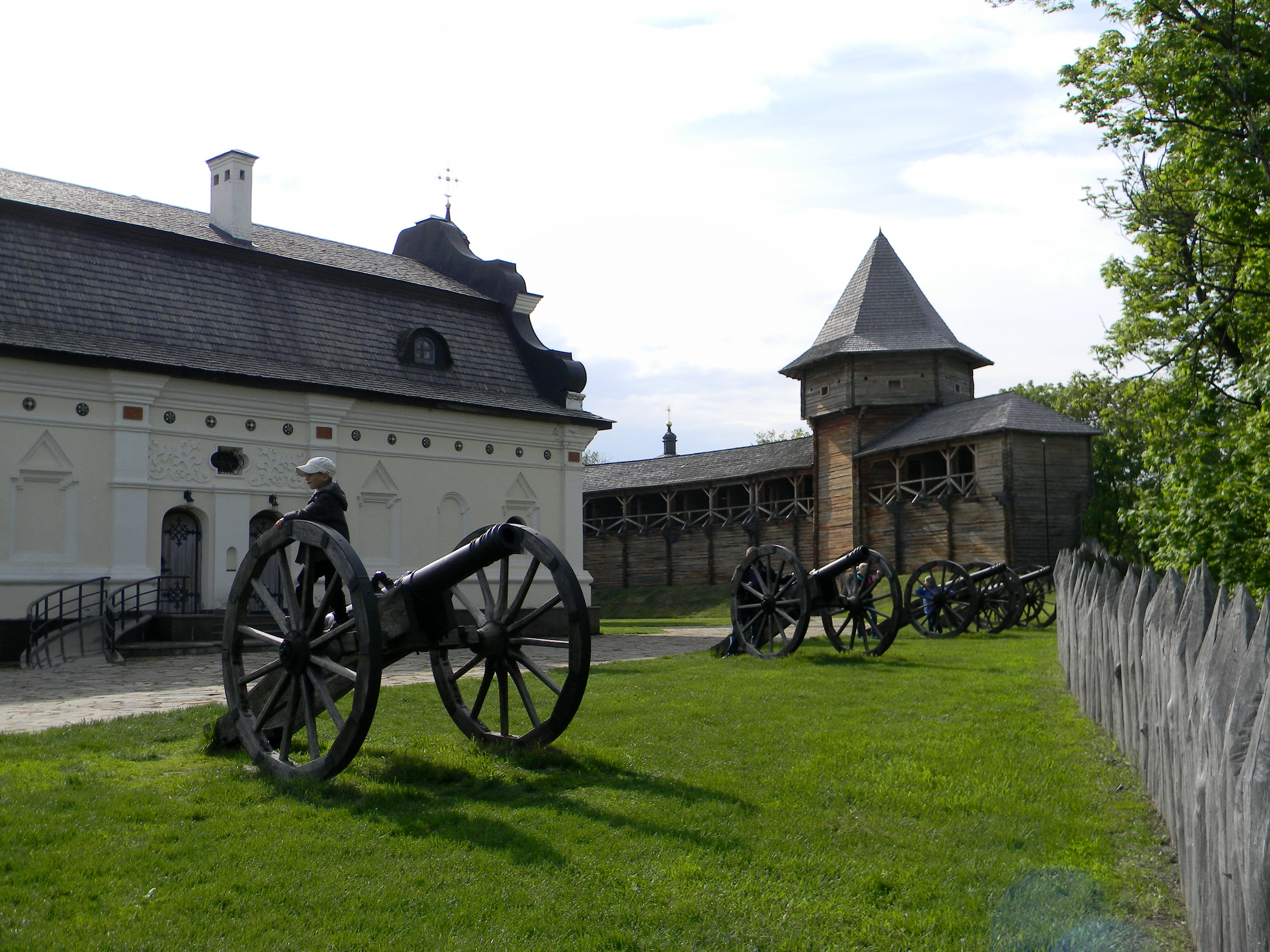
Cossack guns

== See also ==
- Sack of Baturyn
