= Baturyn =

Urban locality in Chernihiv Oblast, Ukraine

Baturyn Батурин
- City
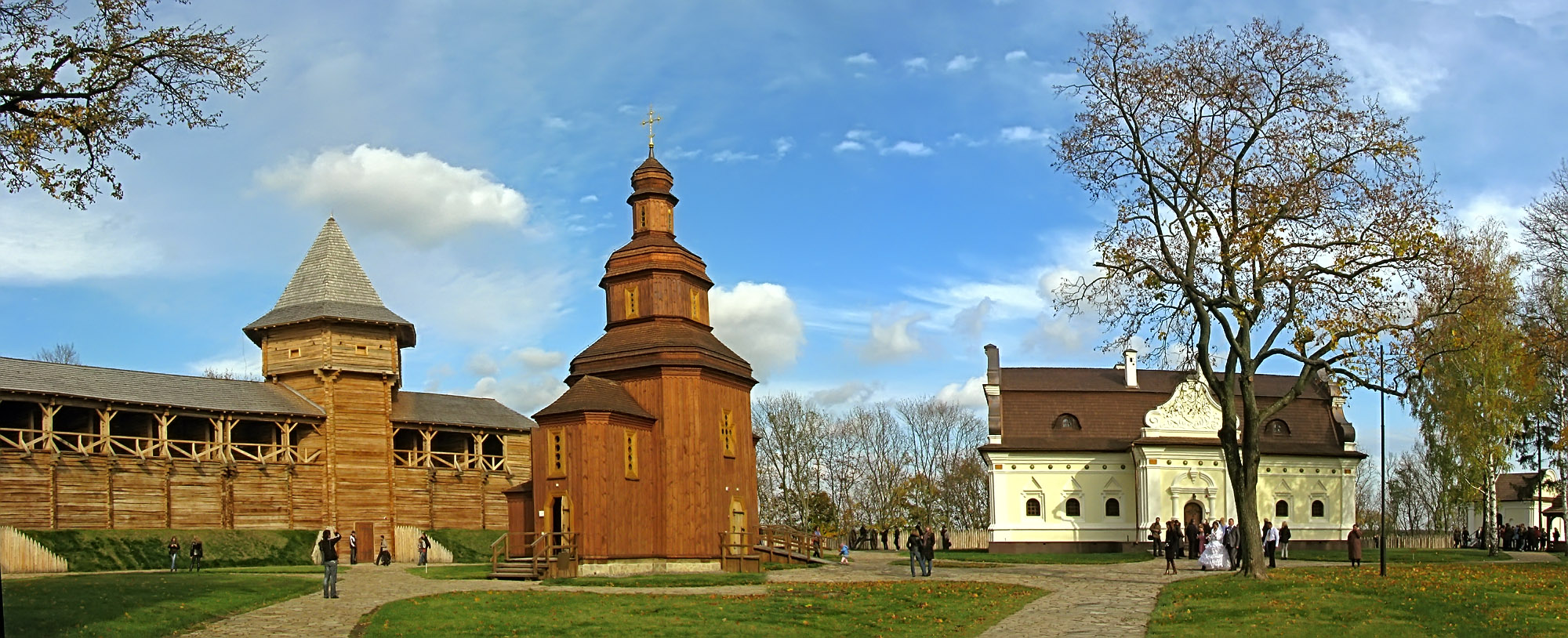
- Baturyn Fortress Citadel

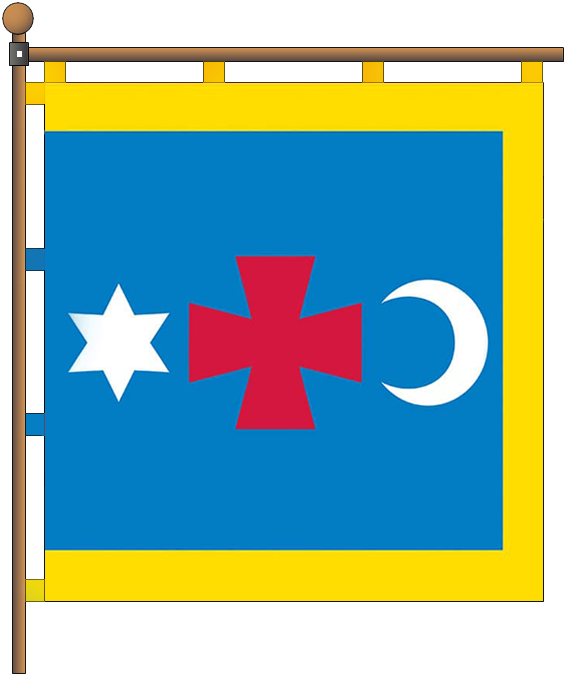
- Flag Seal

- Location within Chernihiv Oblast Location within Ukraine
- Coordinates: 51°21′N 32°53′E
- Country: Ukraine
- Oblast: Chernihiv Oblast
- Raion: Nizhyn Raion
- Hromada: Baturyn urban hromada
- Established: 1625

Area
  - Total: 700 km^{2} (270 sq mi)

Population (2022)
  - Total: 2,406
- Time zone: UTC+2 (EET)
  - Summer (DST): UTC+3 (EEST)
- Postal index: 16512
- Area code: +380 4635

Baturyn (Ukrainian: Батурин, pronounced [bɐˈturɪn]) is a historic city in Chernihiv Oblast (province) of northern Ukraine. It is located in Nizhyn Raion (district) on the banks of the Seym River. It hosts the administration of Baturyn urban hromada, one of the hromadas of Ukraine. Population: 2,406 (2022 estimate).

The city is best known as the capital of the Cossack Hetmanate from 1699 to 1708 and from 1750 to 1764. Due to this, it is home to the historical and cultural reserve of the Hetman's Capital.

== History ==
=== Early history ===
Traces of a settlement dating back to the 9th–10th centuries and a fortified hilltop stronghold dating back to the 11th–13th centuries have been found at the Baturyn site. This fortified settlement was destroyed as a result of the Mongol invasion of 1239. Chernihiv region was part of the Grand Duchy of Lithuania in the 14th century, but was lost to Muscovy as a result of the 1500–1503 war. It returned to the Polish–Lithuanian Commonwealth in 1618. The land on which Baturyn was built was granted to Aleksander Piaseczyński. With royal permission, the town and fortress of Baturyn were founded by Matwiej Stachurski in 1625, who was in Piaseczyński's service. The fortress was captured and burned by Russian troops during the Smolensk War in 1633.

During the final period of Polish rule, Baturyn belonged to the property of crown chancellor Jerzy Ossoliński. Control of the town was wrested away from the Commonwealth by Cossack forces during the Khmelnytsky Uprising of 1648–1657, when they captured the fortress and slaughtered the Polish nobles. In 1648 Baturyn was transformed into a Cossack regional center (sotnia), first hosting the Starodub Cossack Regiment and then the Nizhyn Regiment. After the signing of the Pereiaslav Agreement, the residents of Baturyn swore an oath of allegiance to the tsar on February 7, 1654, after which the city was handed over to the acting Hetman, Ivan Zolotarenko. However, the city burned to the ground later that same year. In July 1655 Zlotarenko asked the tsar to give him two other towns, Borzna and Hlukhiv, in exchange for burned Baturyn.

=== Cossack capital ===
The city rebuilt itself over time. In 1663, in Baturyn, Hetman Ivan Briukhovetsky signed a settlement with Russia that increased dependence on Russia. In 1668, the Baturyn Cossacks supported the anti-Moscow uprising. However, unlike other cities, Baturyn was not burned down after the uprising was suppressed. For this reason, the Cossack elders with the new Hetman Demian Mnohohrishny chose Baturyn as the new center of power, moving it from Hadiach. From 1670, troops of Muscovite Streltsy were stationed here. The capital of the Cossack Hetmanate (an autonomous Cossack republic in Left-bank Ukraine) was located in Baturyn from 1669 to 1708 and from 1750 to 1764.

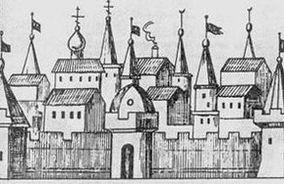
Baturyn in the 18th century

The area prospered under the rule of Hetman Ivan Mazepa (1687–1708), increasing in size and population; by the end of the 17th century it had about 20,000 residents. Baturyn boasted 40 churches and chapels, and two monasteries. Two of the most important institutions of the Hetmanate were located in Baturyn: The General Military Chancellery and the General Military Court. Next to the General Chancellery was the Chancellery Kurin, which prepared for administrative and judicial service. Mazepa also built a fortified palace in Honcharivka near Baturyn as his headquarters.

In 1708 the Zaporozhian Cossacks became involved in the Great Northern War. Hetman Mazepa, after realizing that the Russians planned to remove him from power, switched his allegiance to Sweden (then at war with the Russian Empire) and began to place more emphasis on Ukraine's independence. On 13 November 1708 a Russian army under the command of Alexander Menshikov sacked and razed Baturyn and slaughtered all of its inhabitants in a punitive response. The Russians broke Dmytro Chechel, the commanding officer of the Baturyn garrison, on the wheel. Historian Serhiy Pavlenko estimates that Menshikov's army murdered 6 to 7.5 thousand civilians and 5 to 6.5 thousand military personnel. In 1708 the city had had a population of 20,000; by 1726 it had become a ghost town. The capital of Hetmanate was moved to Hlukhiv.

=== In the Russian Empire ===
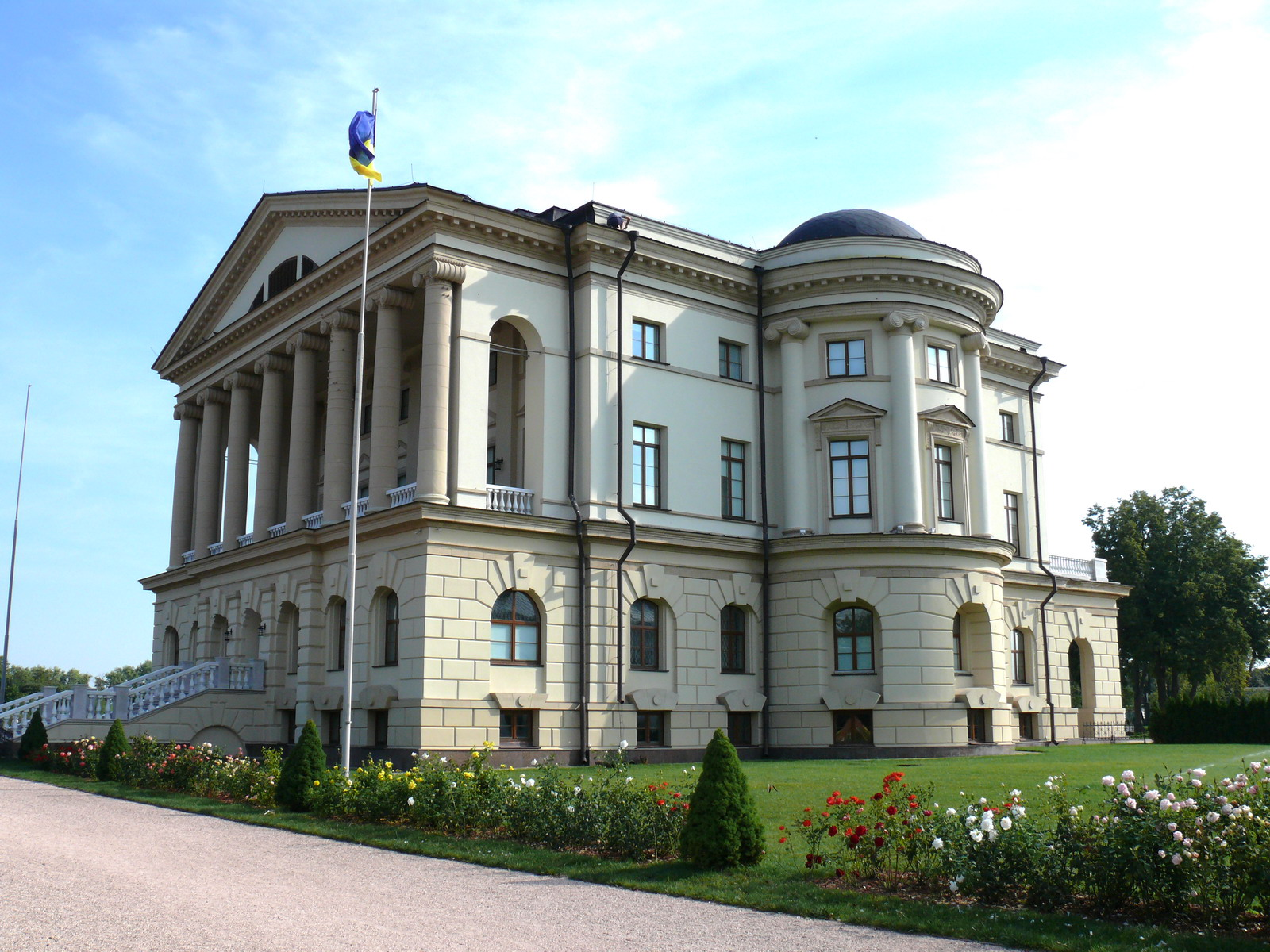
The neo-Palladian palace in Baturyn, designed by Andrey Kvasov and rebuilt by Charles Cameron.

The town was rebuilt in the 1750s, and served as the capital for Hetman Count Kirill Razumovsky (in office 1750 to 1764). Andrey Kvasov designed Razumovsky's palace in the Baroque style (later Charles Cameron rebuilt it in the Neoclassical style in 1799–1803). The home of the famous Cossack Vasyl Kochubey (c. 1640–1708), constructed some 50 years earlier, is surrounded today by a park in his name (although hostilities devastated this building during World War II, it was restored during Soviet times).

Following the death of Hetman Razumovsky (1803) the town lost most of its political stature. In 1756 a textile plant was founded with 12 weaving machines. It quickly grew to include 76 machines. When Russian empress Catherine II (reigned 1762 to 1796) abolished the Ukrainian Cossack state and incorporated its territories into the Russian Empire, Baturyn continued manufacturing textiles, feeding a growing demand for carpets. In 1843 Taras Shevchenko stayed in the town, using his time to paint many of the architectural sights. In 1860, Baturyn had a population of 3,563, which by 1880 grew to 6,580. Three annual fairs were held in Baturyn in the late 19th century.

=== Modern era ===
Baturyn lost its city status in 1923 and received it back only in 2008. In 1924 a museum of beekeeping named after Petro Prokopovych was established in Baturyn.

During World War II, the German occupiers operated a Jewish forced labour battalion in Baturyn.

In June 1993 the Ukrainian government declared Baturyn the center of a national site of Ukrainian history and culture. In August 2002, at the prodding of President Viktor Yushchenko, a government program was approved to restore Baturyn to its former glory.

On 22 January 2009 Ukraine's President Viktor Yushchenko officially opened the "Hetmans' Capital" monumental complex (including the newly renovated Razumovsky Palace).

Until 18 July 2020, Baturyn belonged to Bakhmach Raion. The raion was abolished in July 2020 as part of the administrative reform of Ukraine, which reduced the number of raions of Chernihiv Oblast to five. The area of Bakhmach Raion was merged into Nizhyn Raion.

== Kyrylo Rozumovskyi Palace ==
The Hetman palace of Kyrylo Rozumovskyi is the main adornment and the central feature of Baturyn (Chernihiv region, Ukraine). K. Rozumovskyi decided to transfer the capital of the Hetmanate (Ukrainian Cossack State) from Hlukhiv to Baturyn town soon after being elected the hetman of Ukraine. Baturyn was re-established as capital and Rozumovskyi rebuilt the town and ushered in a brief renaissance. He established the manufacturing of carpets, broadcloth, silk, candles, bricks, and cocklestove tiles, and a stud-farm, a parish school, and a hospital. Hetman also planned to set up a university there.

His intention to gain more autonomy for Ukraine triggered imperial wrath. He was removed from his post of Ukraine's hetman in 1764. Only in 1794 he returned to Baturyn and decided to establish a grandiose palace and a park ensemble. For that purpose he invited the Scottish architect Charles Cameron, whose architectural designs were much appreciated by the Russian Empress Catherine II.

Cameron was the chief architect of palaces in Tsarskoye Selo, Pavlovsk and others. The only creation of Charles Cameron in Ukraine is this Palace and park ensemble of K. Rozumovskyi in Baturyn.

During 1799–1803 the construction of this historical complex was performed in accordance with his design: the 3-storeyed Palace, constructed in the classicism style and 2 outbuildings, located on both sides of it, as well as a great park around them.

In 1803 after the death of K. Rozumovskyi everything was changed. The decoration works were stopped, and the palace was abandoned. The fire of 1824 ruined practically all its interior decorations.

The issue of the palace restoration was raised in 1908 at the XIV All-Russian Archaeological Convention.

Since 1911 the palace was under the guardianship of the "Society for Preservation and Protection of the Architectural and Ancient Monuments in Russia". The great-grandson of K. Rozumovskyi, Kamil Lvovych Rozumovskyi, visited Baturyn in 1909. He donated money for the palace restoration with the desire to settle a Folk Art Museum there. An architect from Petersburg Oleksandr Bilogrud worked out the design of restoration, and guided the restoration works till 1913.

Further tragic events, WWI and the Bolshevik revolution of 1917 put the restoration aside for a long period of time. The building suffered a lot in the fire of 1923. The outbuildings were completely ruined at the beginning of the 20th century. During World War II the facade walls and the decoration elements of the palace were seriously damaged. The second half of the 20th century has seen several restoration attempts, which preserved the state of the palace, though none of them were completed.

In 2002, under the initiative of V. Yushchenko, then the Prime-Minister of Ukraine, "The Comprehensive Programme On "Hetman's Capital" Monuments' Preservation" was developed. The realization of this Programme started in 2003. The volume of works increased considerably in 2005 – after Ukrainian philanthropists donated money for restoration, and the works for the palace and outbuildings' restoration were conducted in 2005–2006.

In 2007–2008 the State Budget spent significant sums on it as well. A large amount of work was performed in 2008 and for the first time in its history the Palace obtained its original state. The palace was opened on August 22, 2009. The descendant Gregor Rozumovskyi was invited with his family on the ceremony of the grand opening and he presented the priceless heirloom – a broadsword of Hetman Kyrylo Rozumovskyi.

The restorers recreated the modelling and decoration of the walls, filled the interiors with paintings of Ukrainian hetmans, exclusive chandeliers, floors of palace and artistic parquet.

The dancing halls were reconstructed as close to their original look and style seen in the 19th century. The classical music, performed on the old grand piano, conducts the excursions. Nowadays the palace of Kyrylo Rozumovskyi is used to hold different concerts, theatrical performance and weddings.

== International relations ==
Baturyn is twinned with:

- Cobham, United Kingdom (since 11 March 2025)

== See also ==
- Hetman of Zaporizhian Host
- Hetman's Capital
- House of Judge General Vasyl Kochubey
- Citadel of Baturyn Fortress
- Sack of Baturyn

== Gallery ==
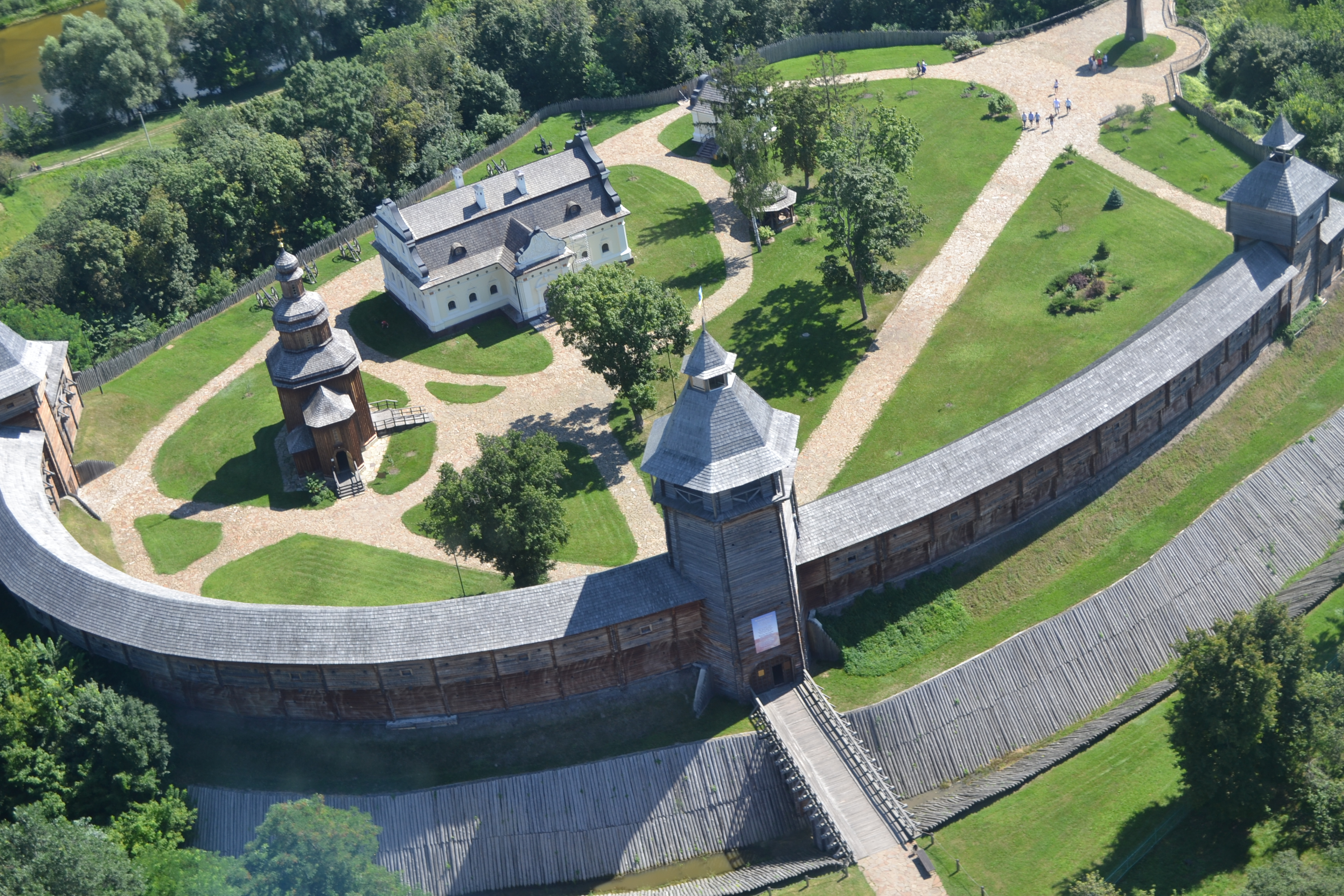
The citadel of the Baturyn fortress, rebuilt in 2008

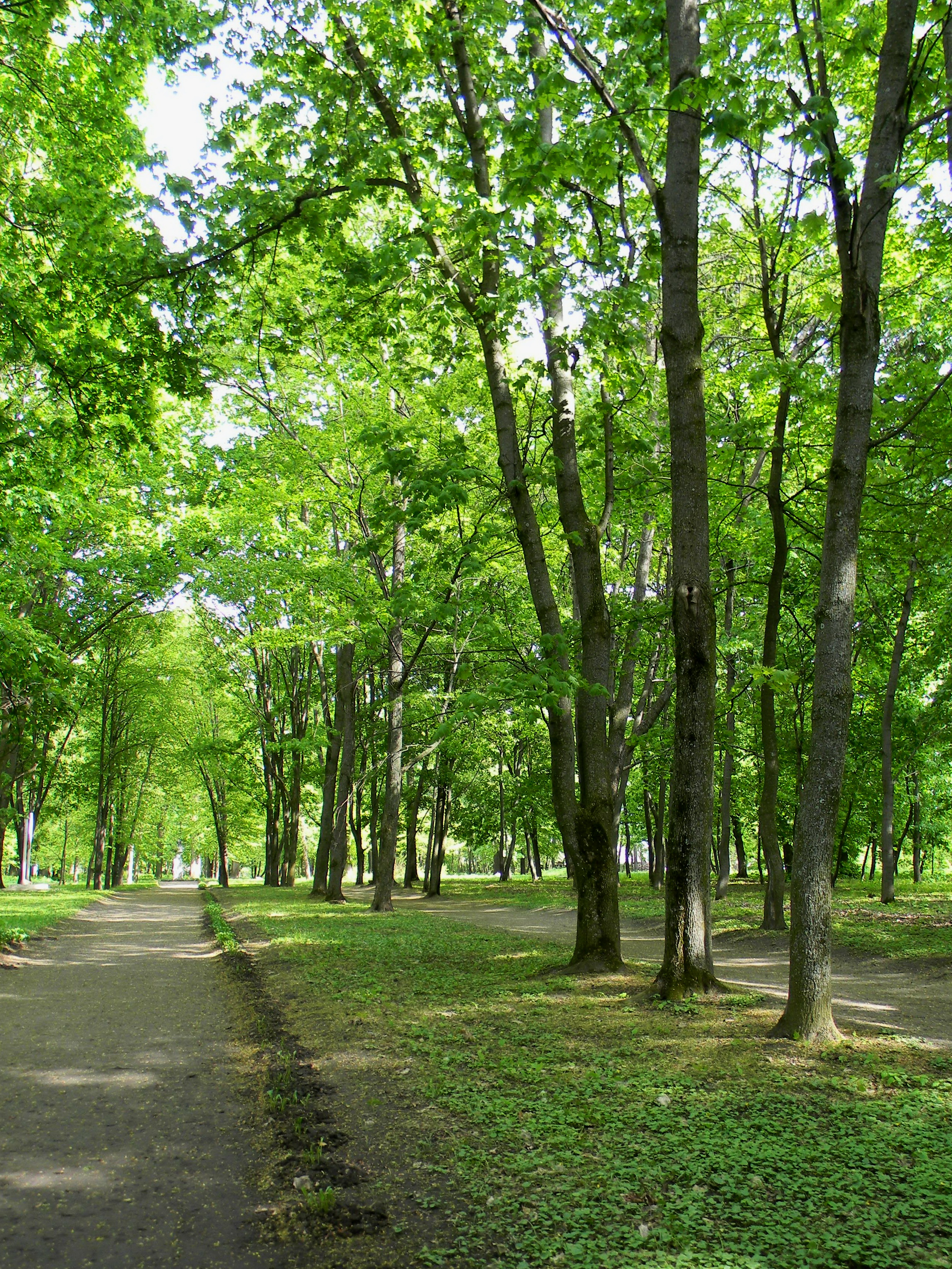
Kochubeivskyi Park Alley

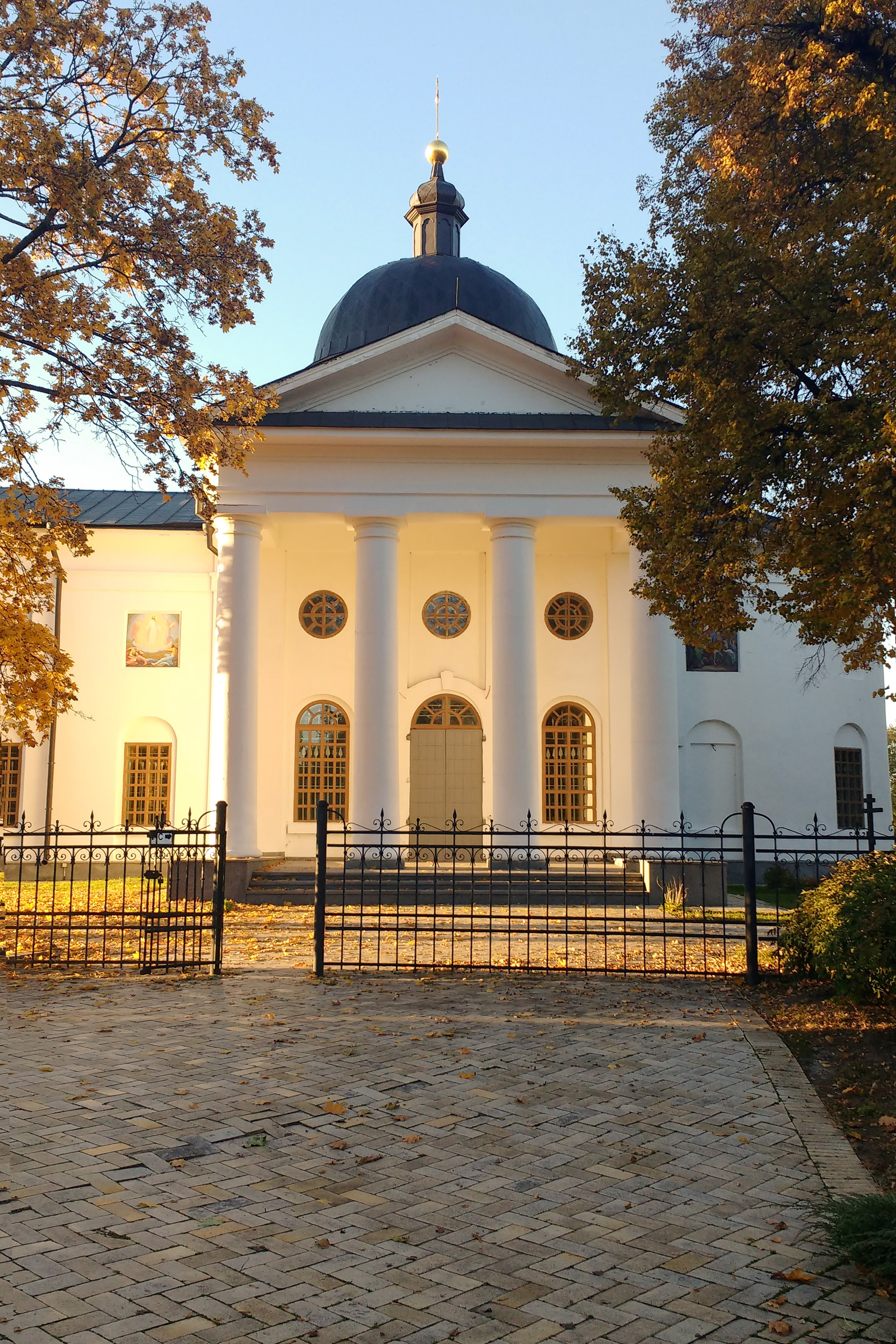
Church of the Resurrection

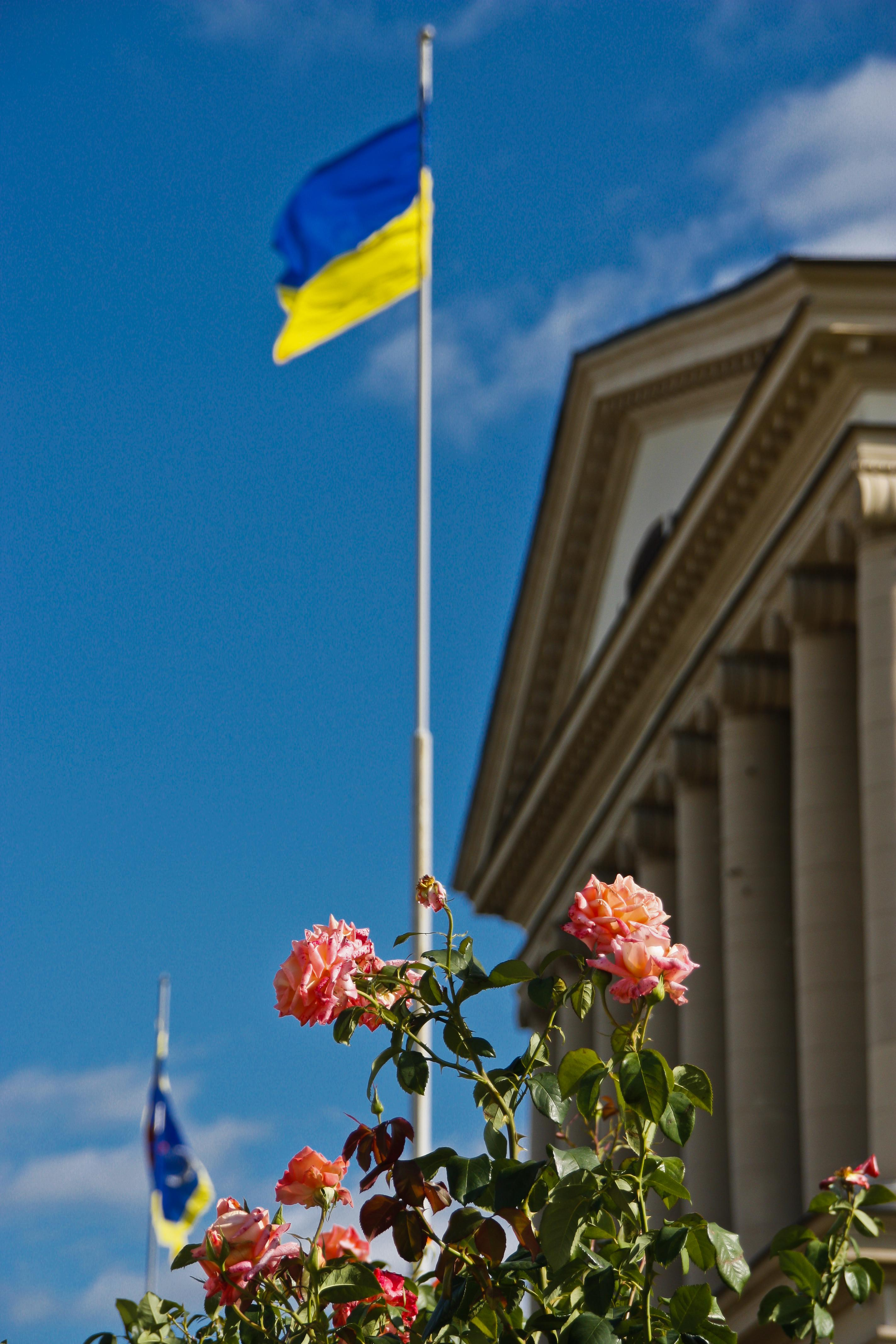
Rozumovskyi Palace

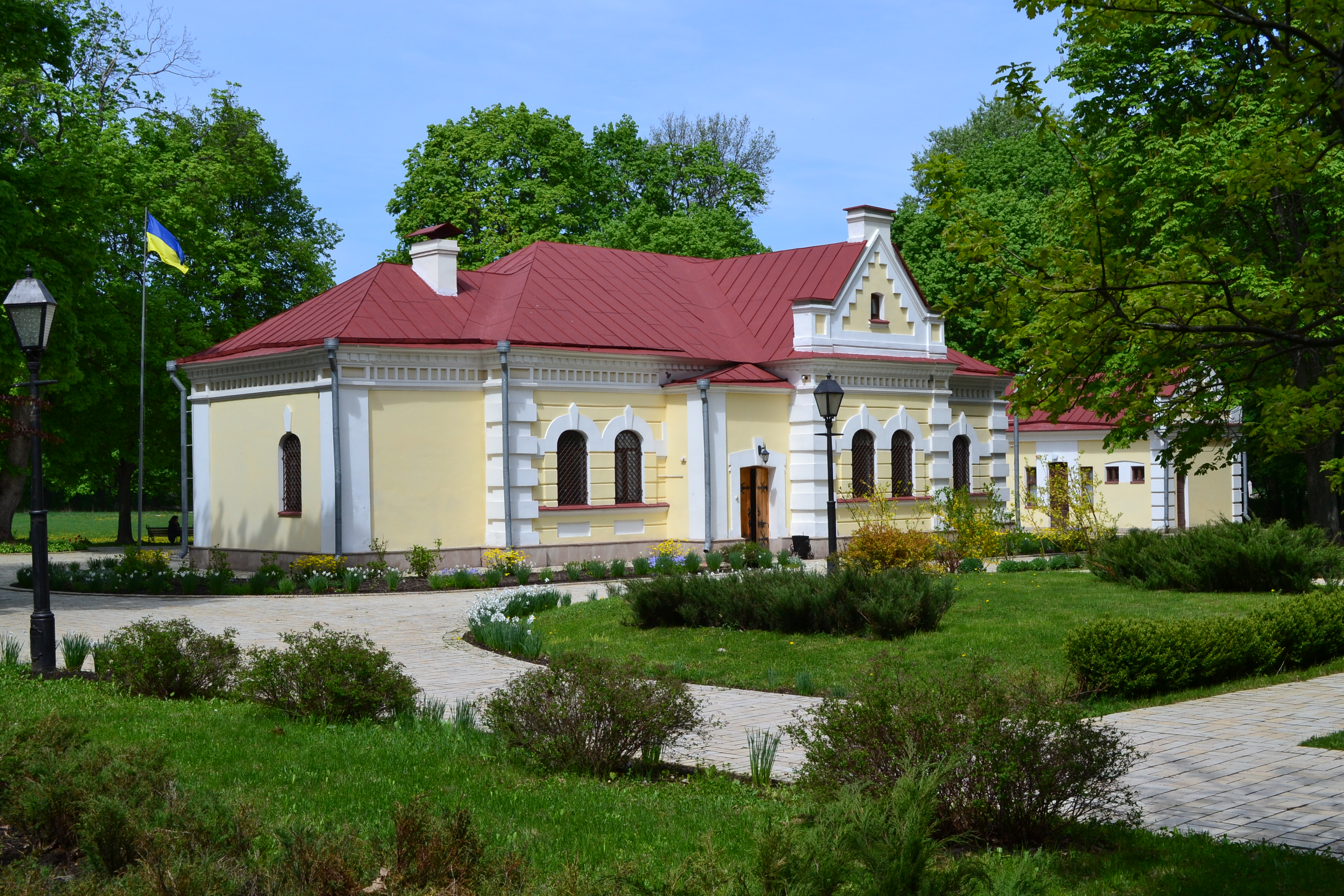
House-museum of General Judge Vasyl Kochubey

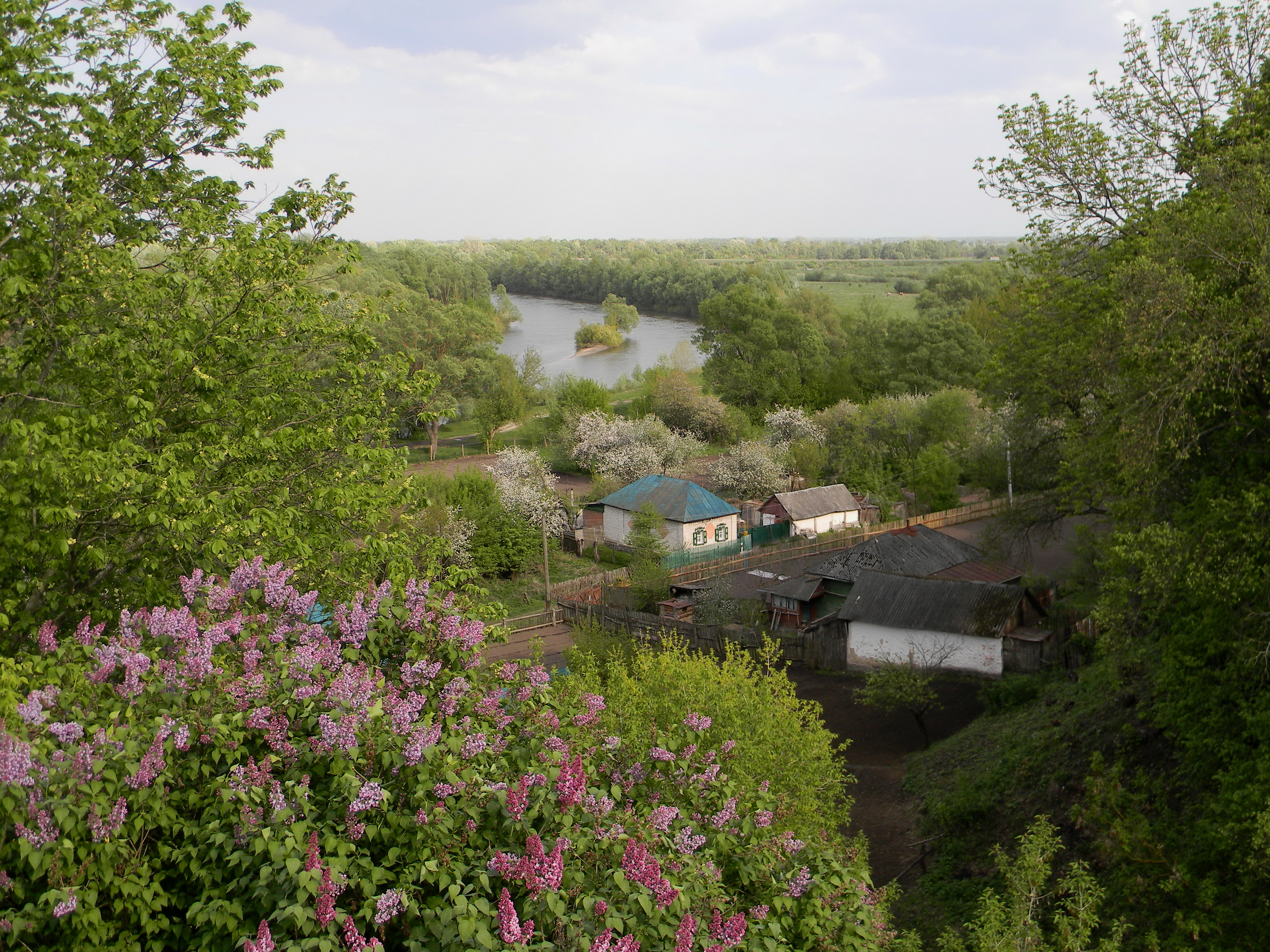
View of the Seim River

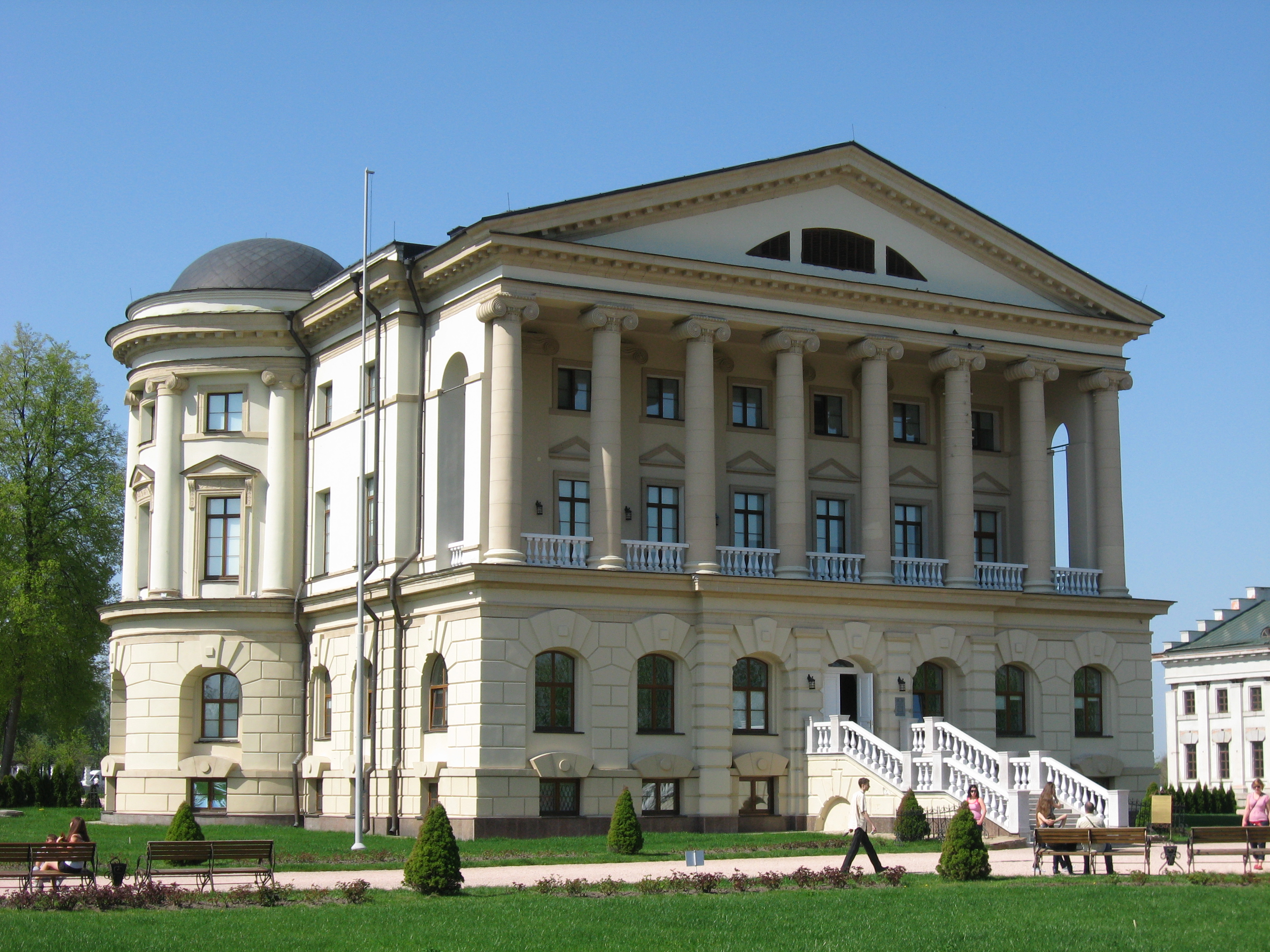
Palace of Razumovsky

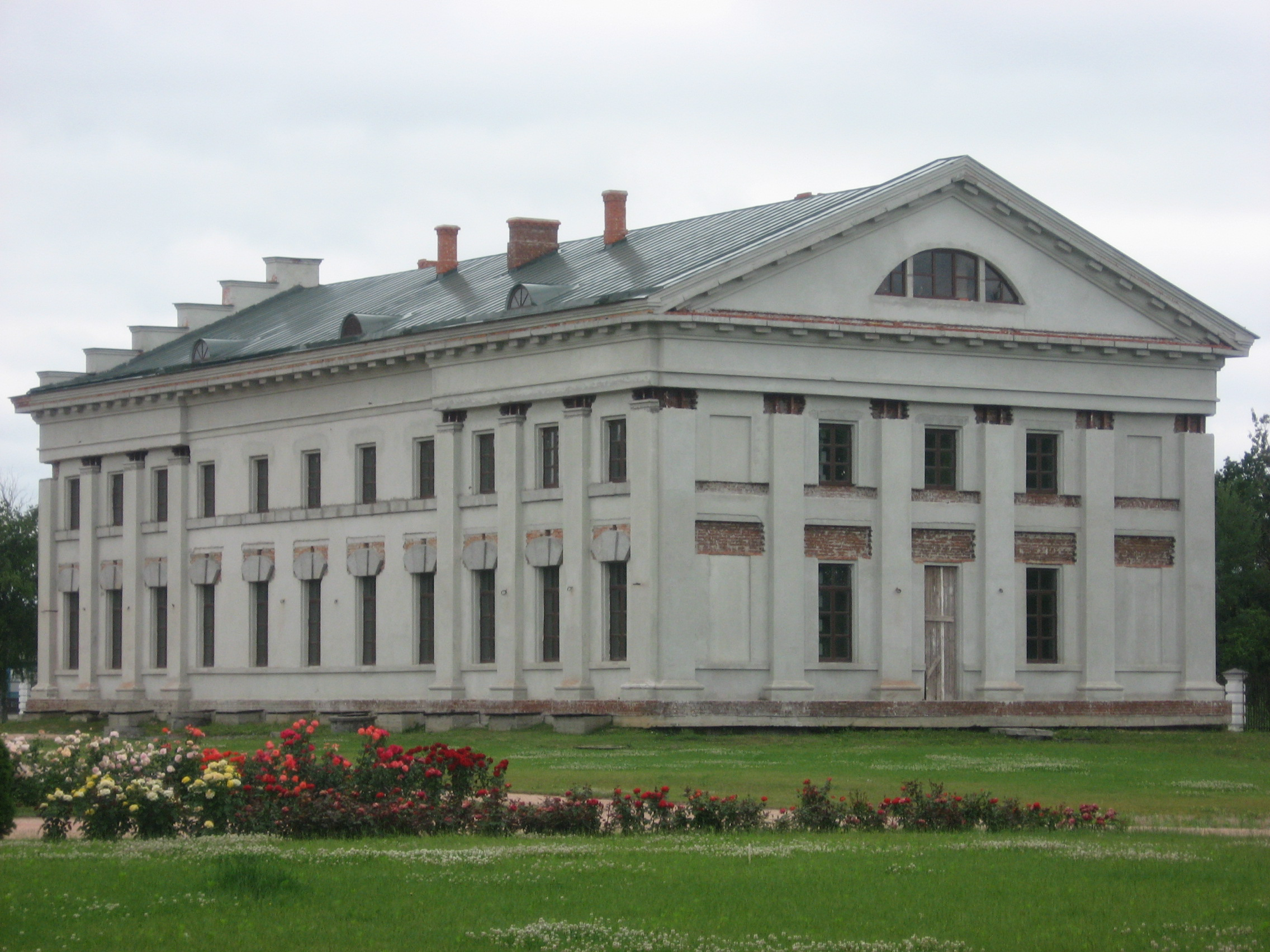
Western wing

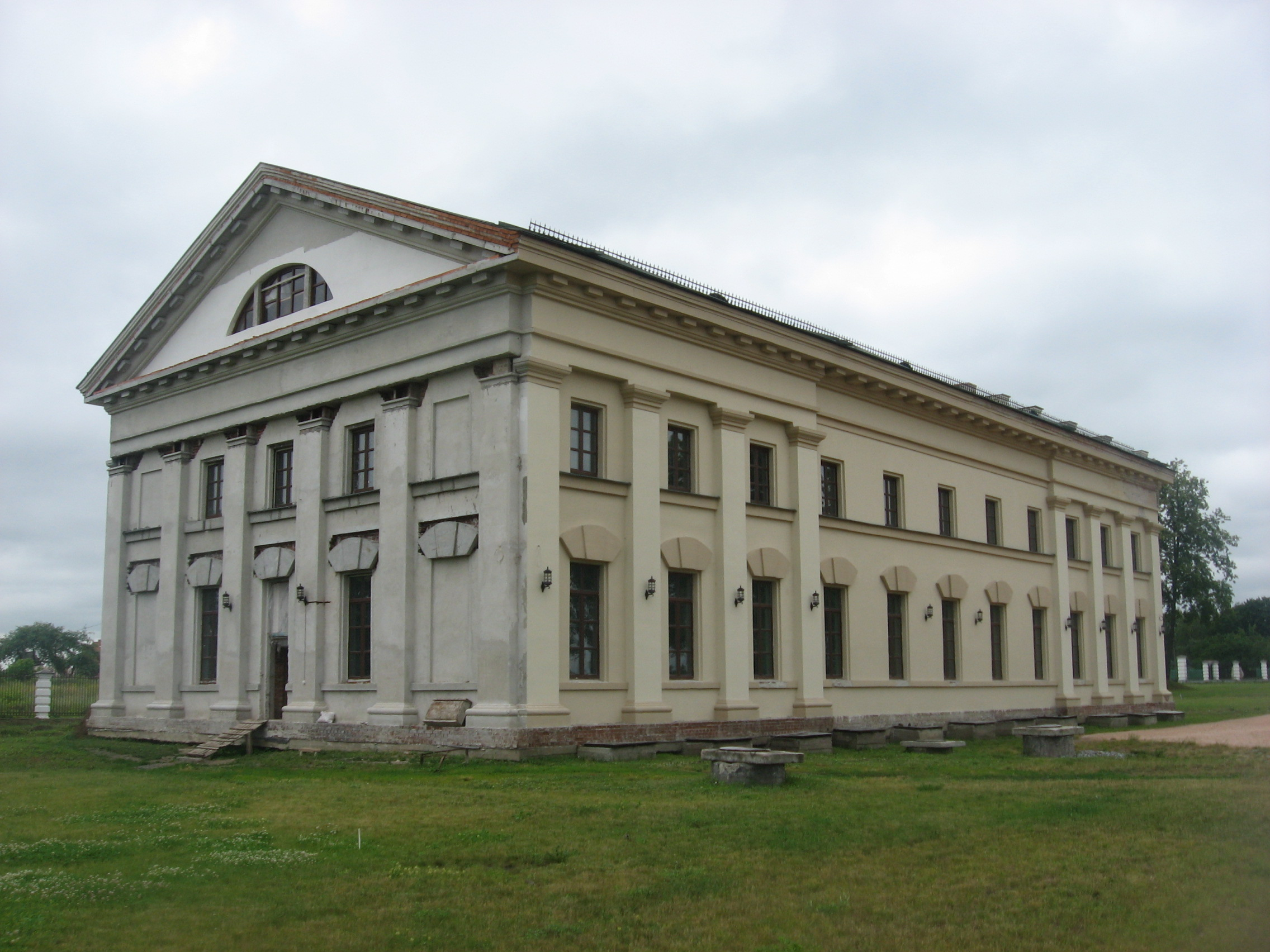
Eastern wing

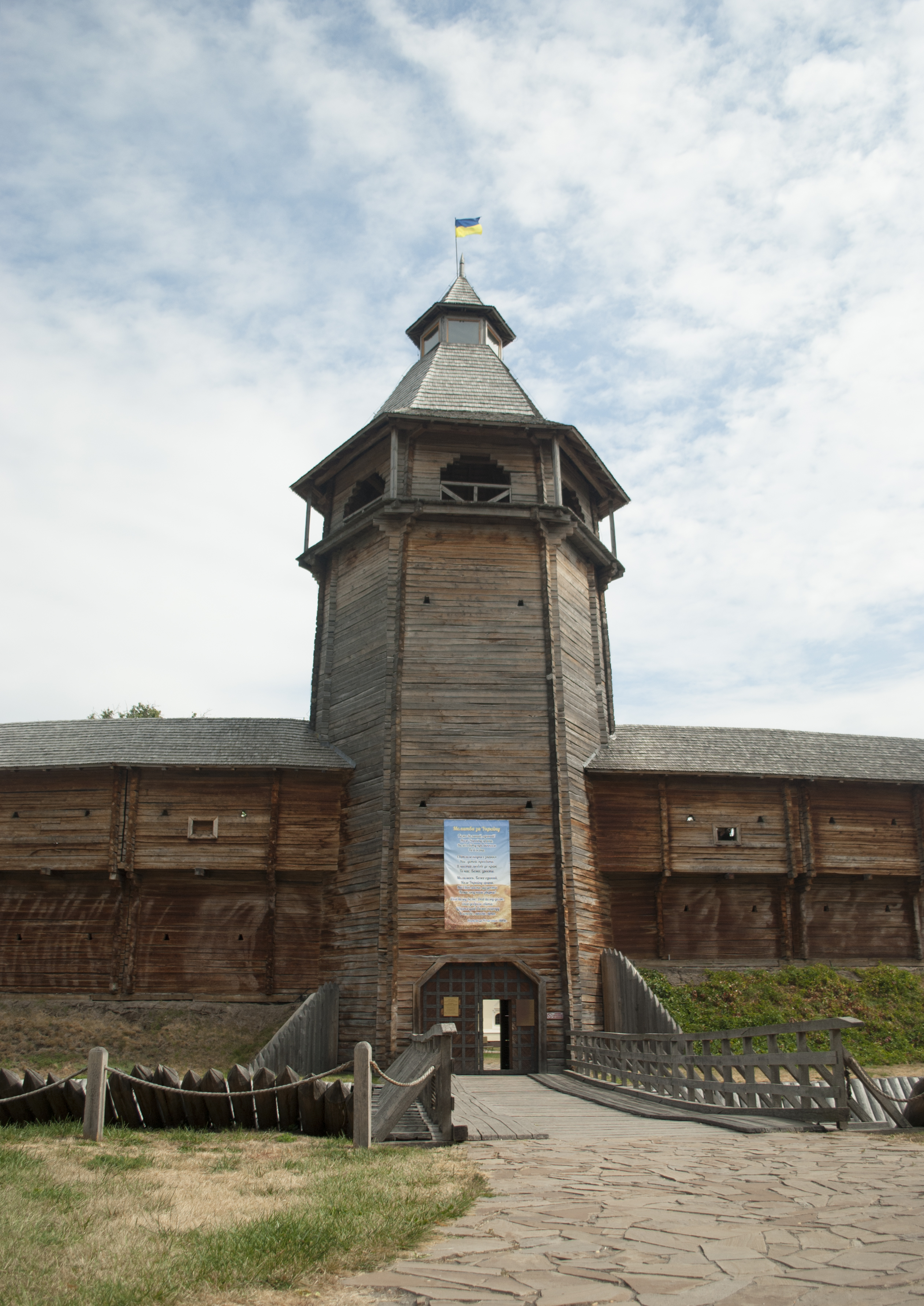
Tower of the Fortress

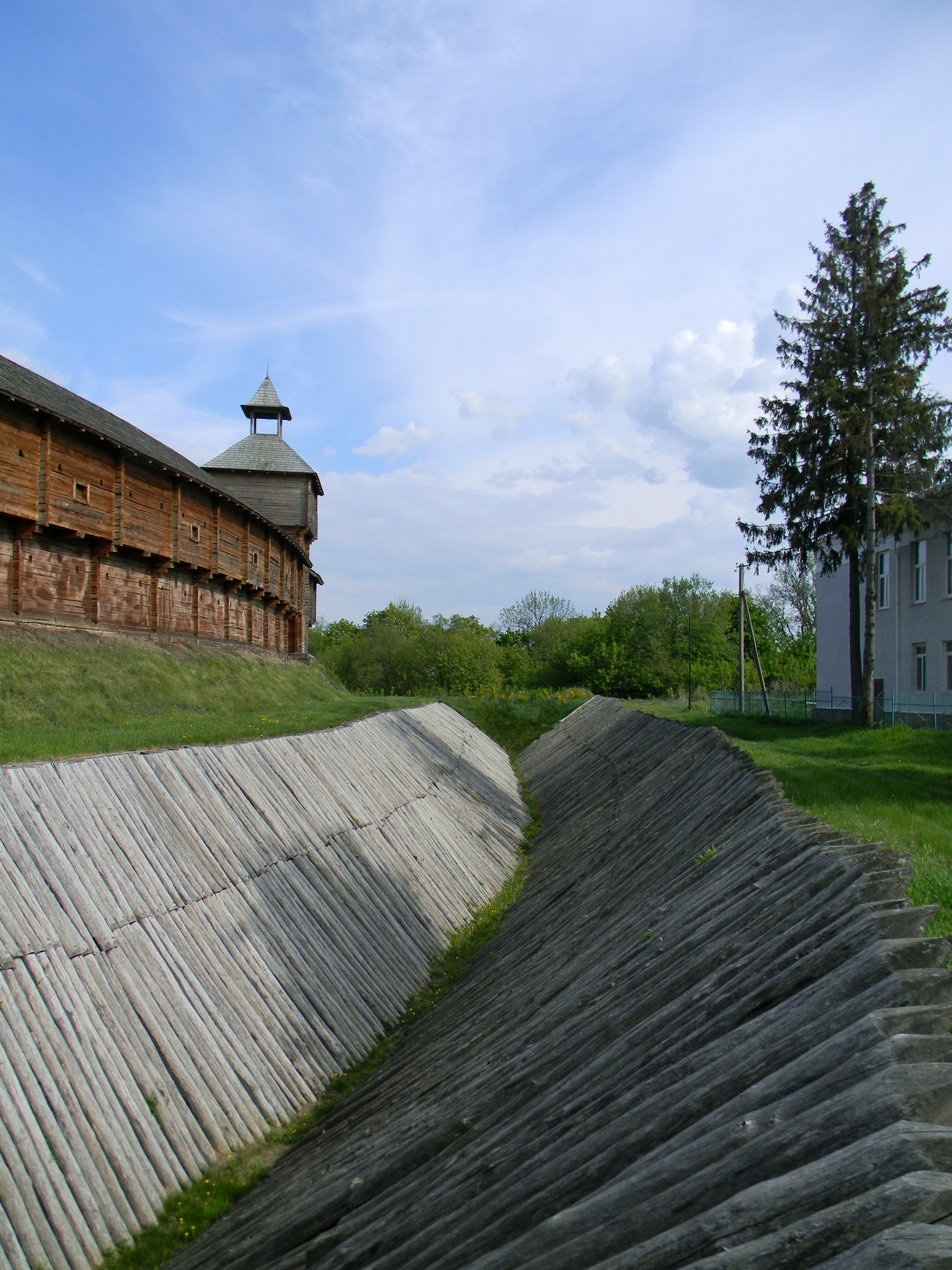
Defense moat

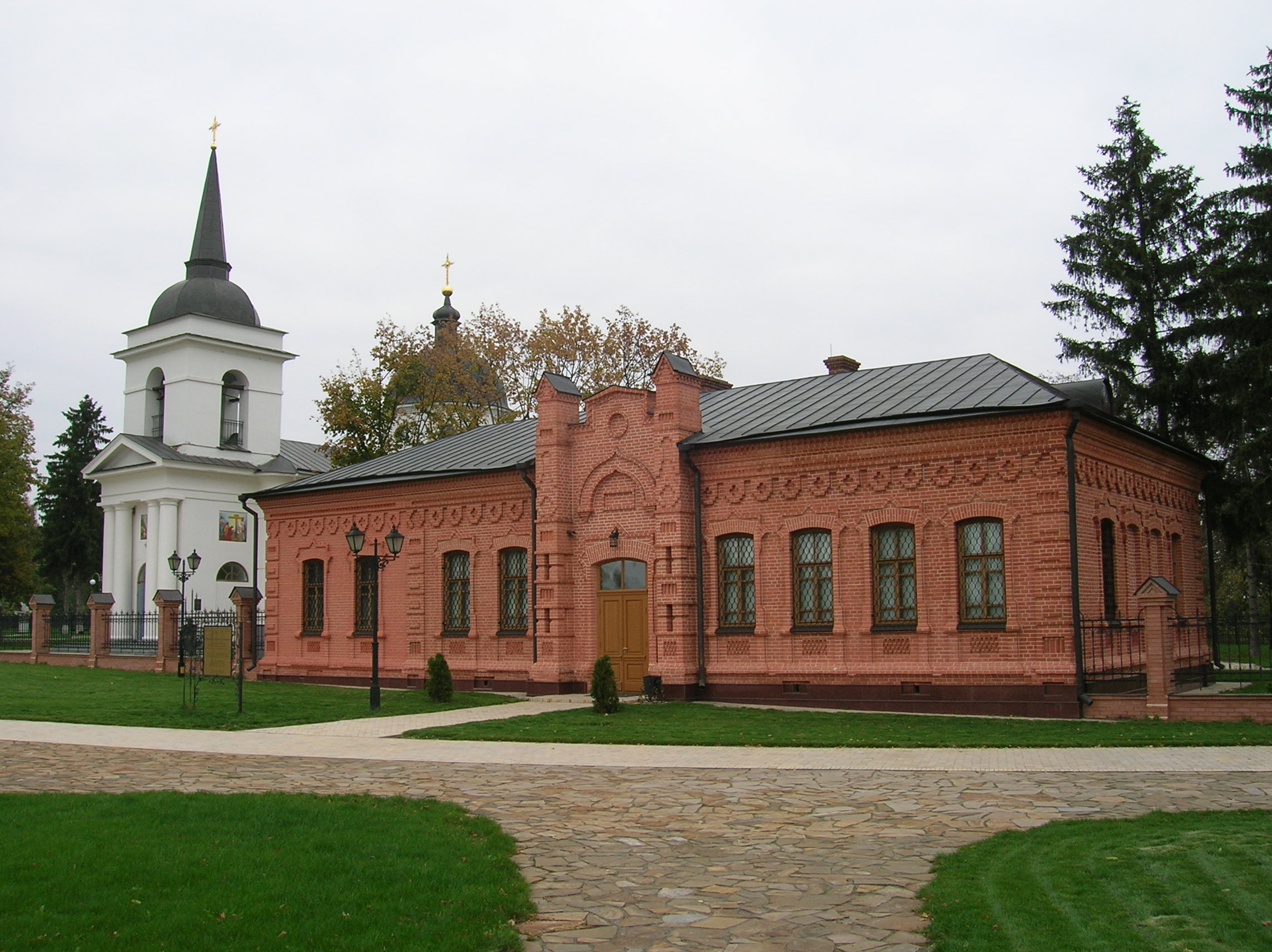
Archaeology Museum

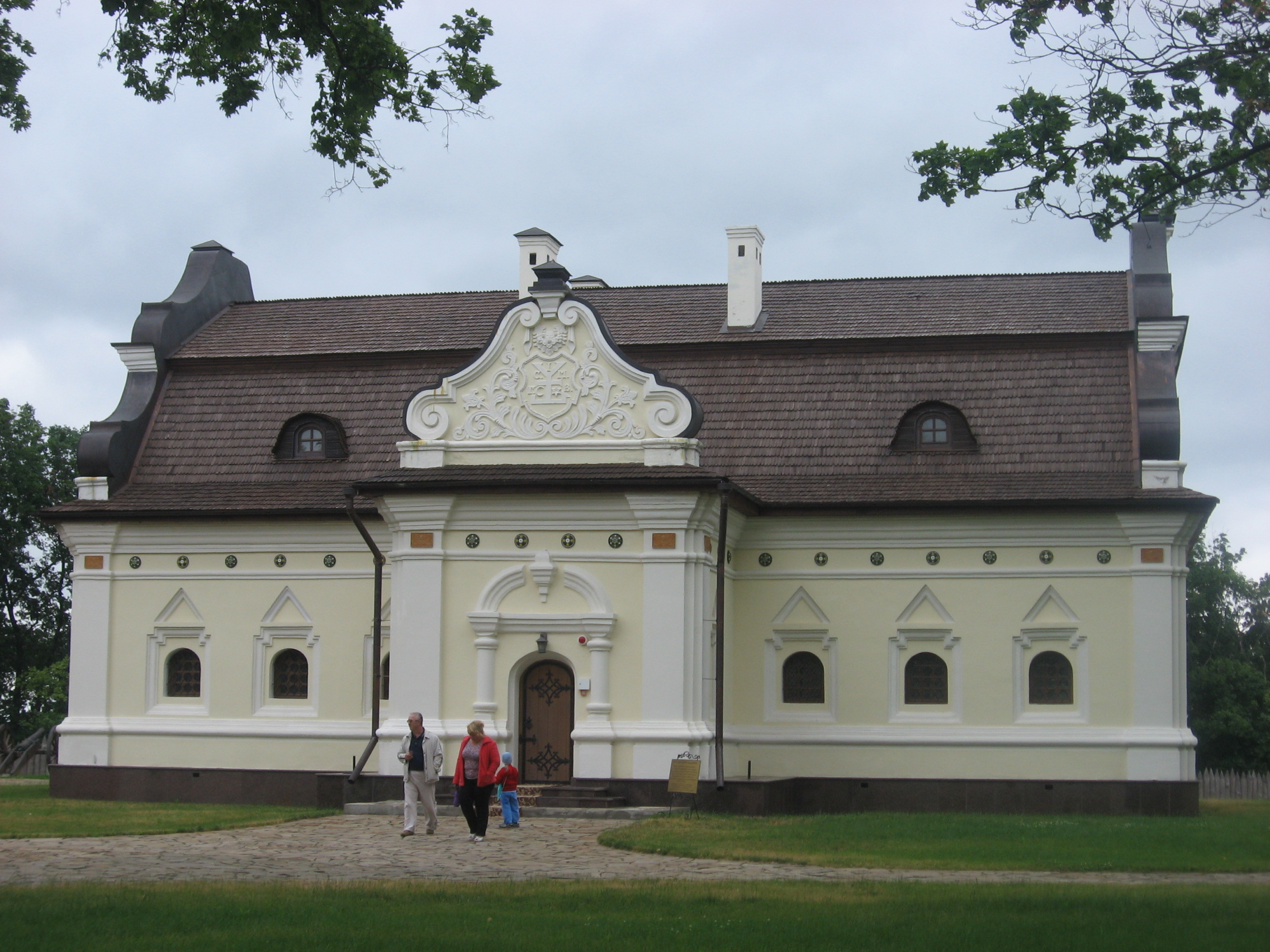
Hetman's house

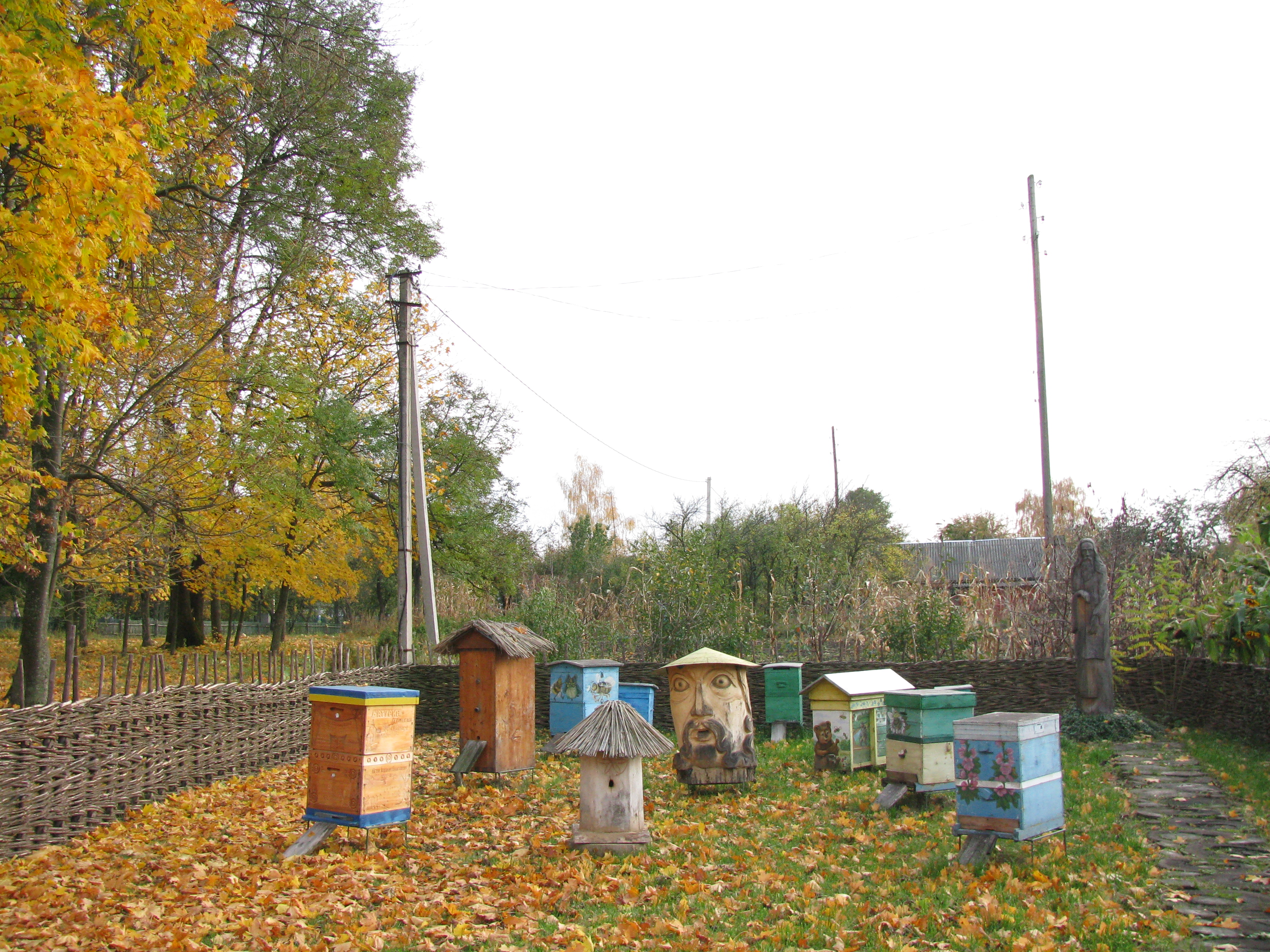
Apiary named after P.I. Prokopovych.

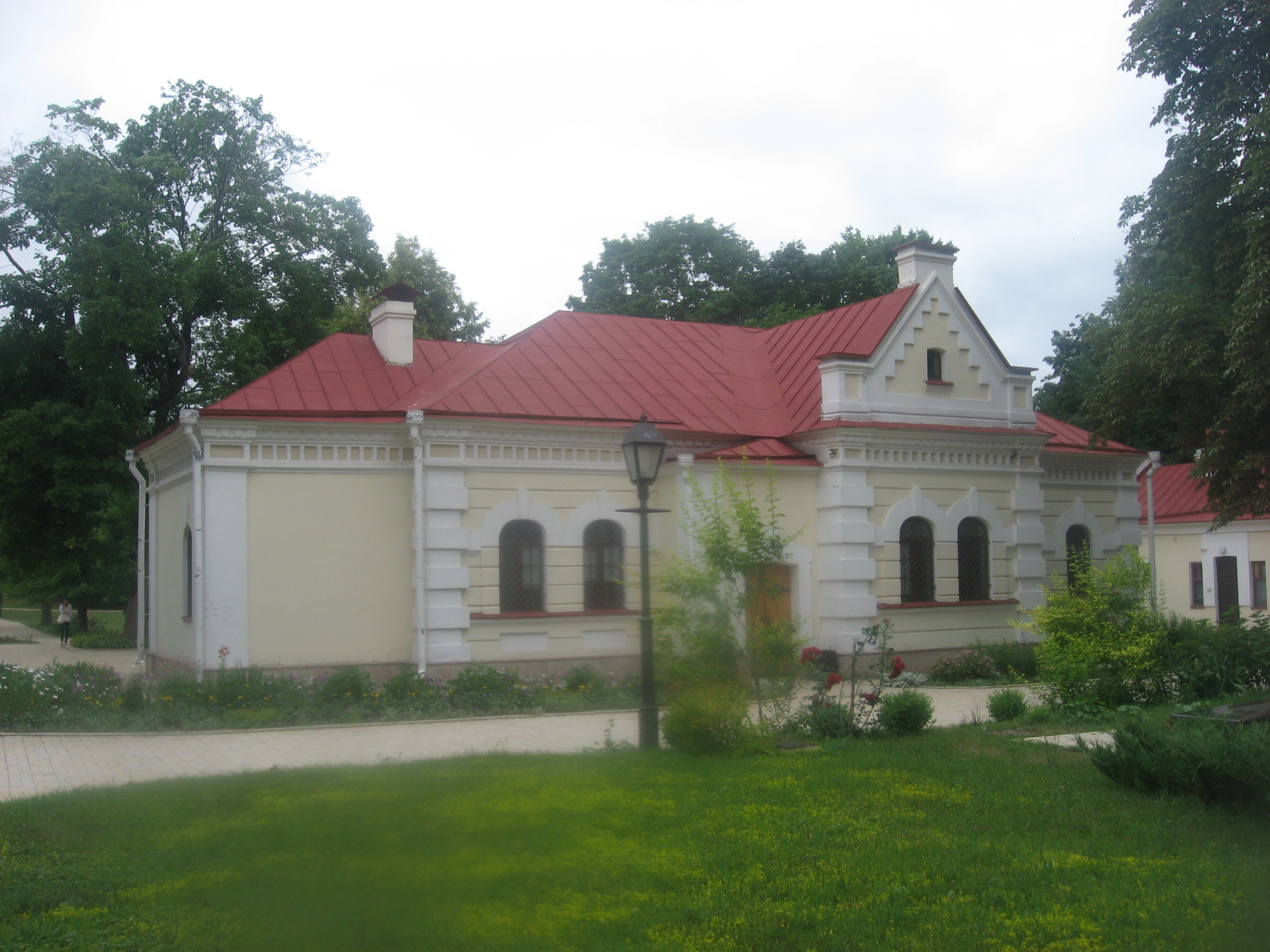
House-Museum of Judge General Vasyl Kochubey

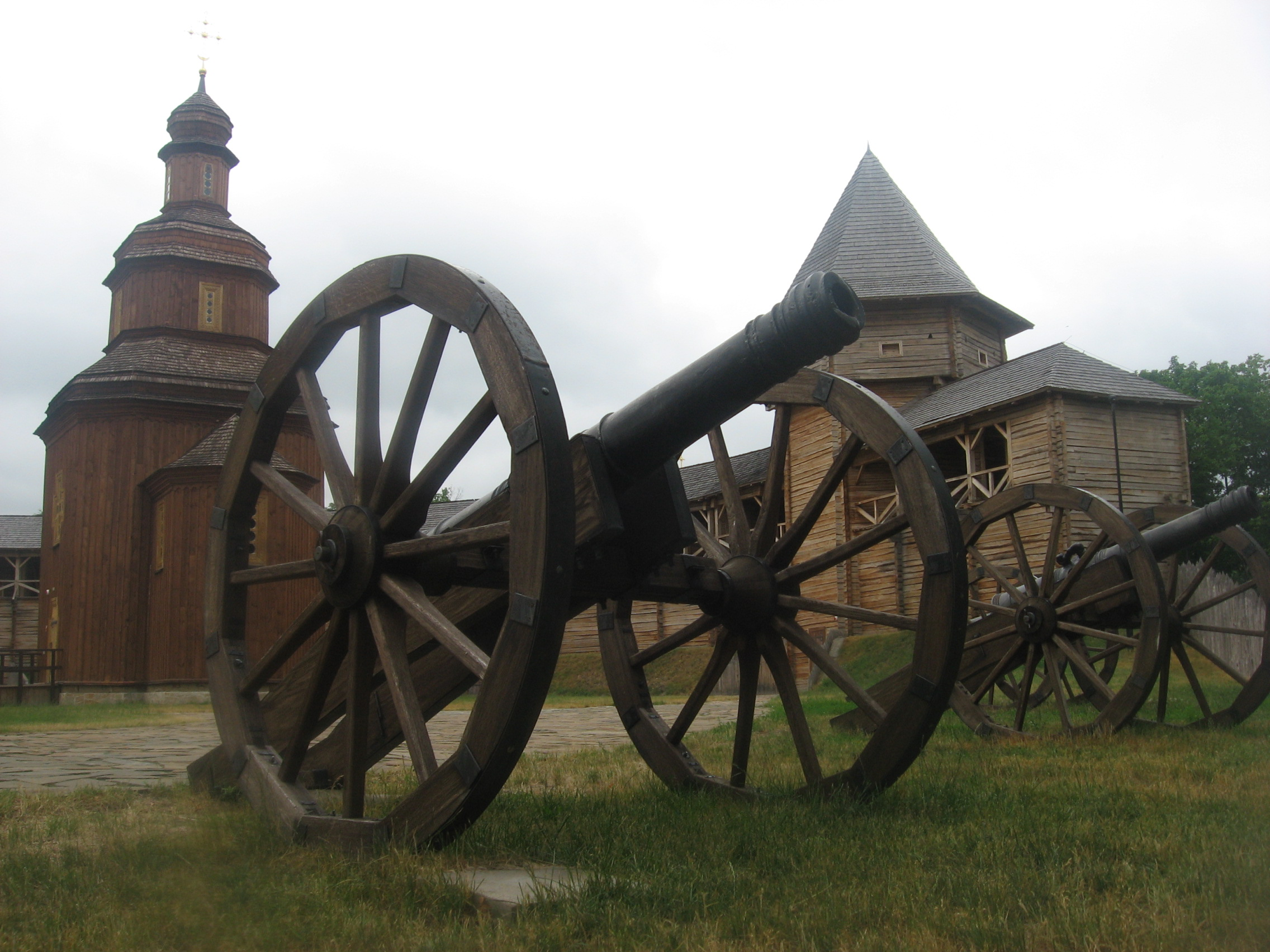
Cannons

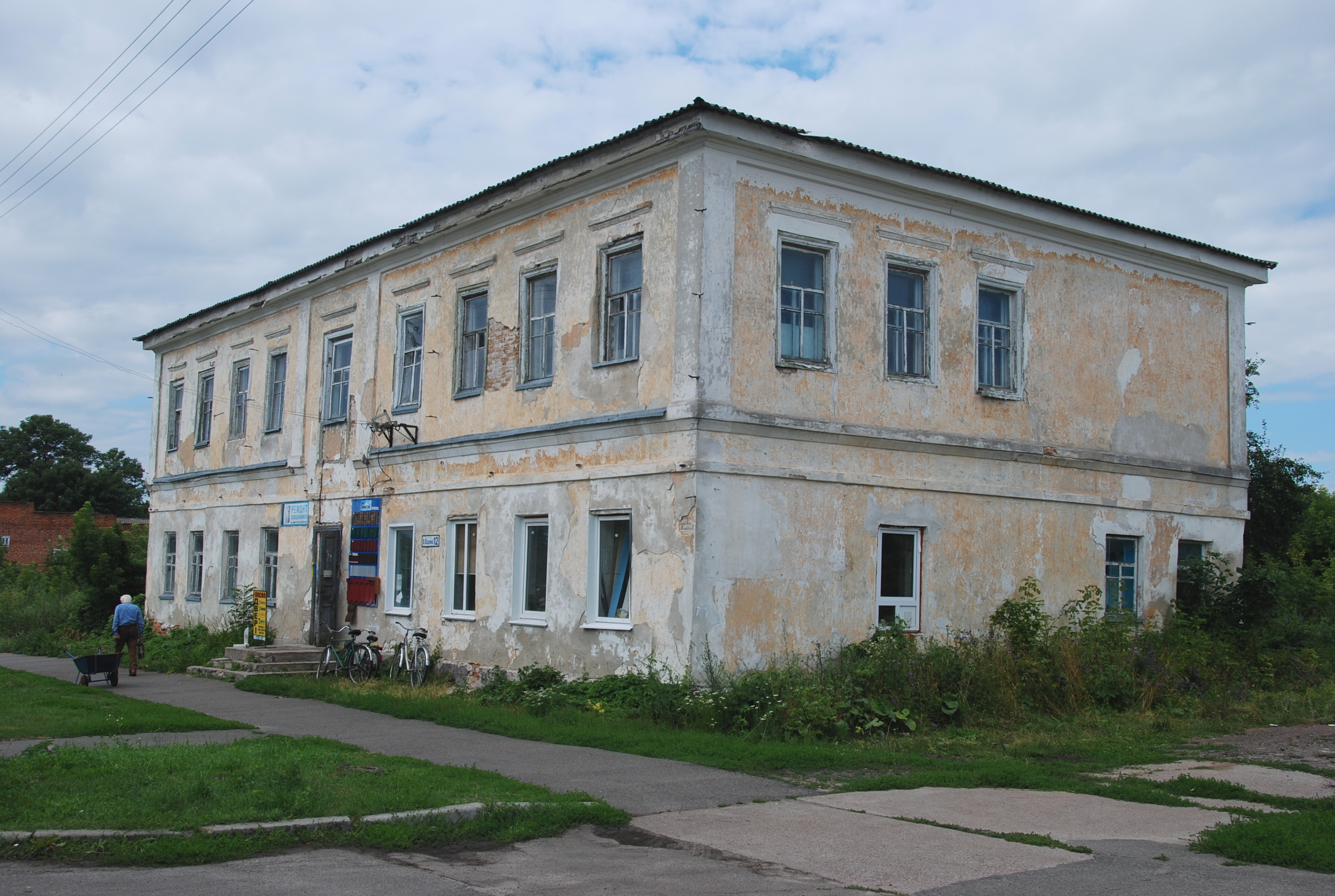
Hotel Stokoza, 19th century
