= Nikanorovka, Rostov Oblast =

Nikanorovka Никаноровка
- Sloboda
- Location within Rostov Oblast Location within Russia
- Coordinates: 49°06′37″N 39°58′58″E
- Country: Russia
- Region: Rostov Oblast
- District: Millerovsky District
- Time zone: UTC+3:00

Nikanorovka (Russian: Никаноровка) is a rural locality (a sloboda) in Voloshynskoye Selsoviet of Millerovsky District, in Rostov Oblast, Russia. Population: 31 (2010 census); 23 (2002 census);
