= Gubkin =

Town in Belgorod Oblast, Russia

Gubkin Губкин
- Town
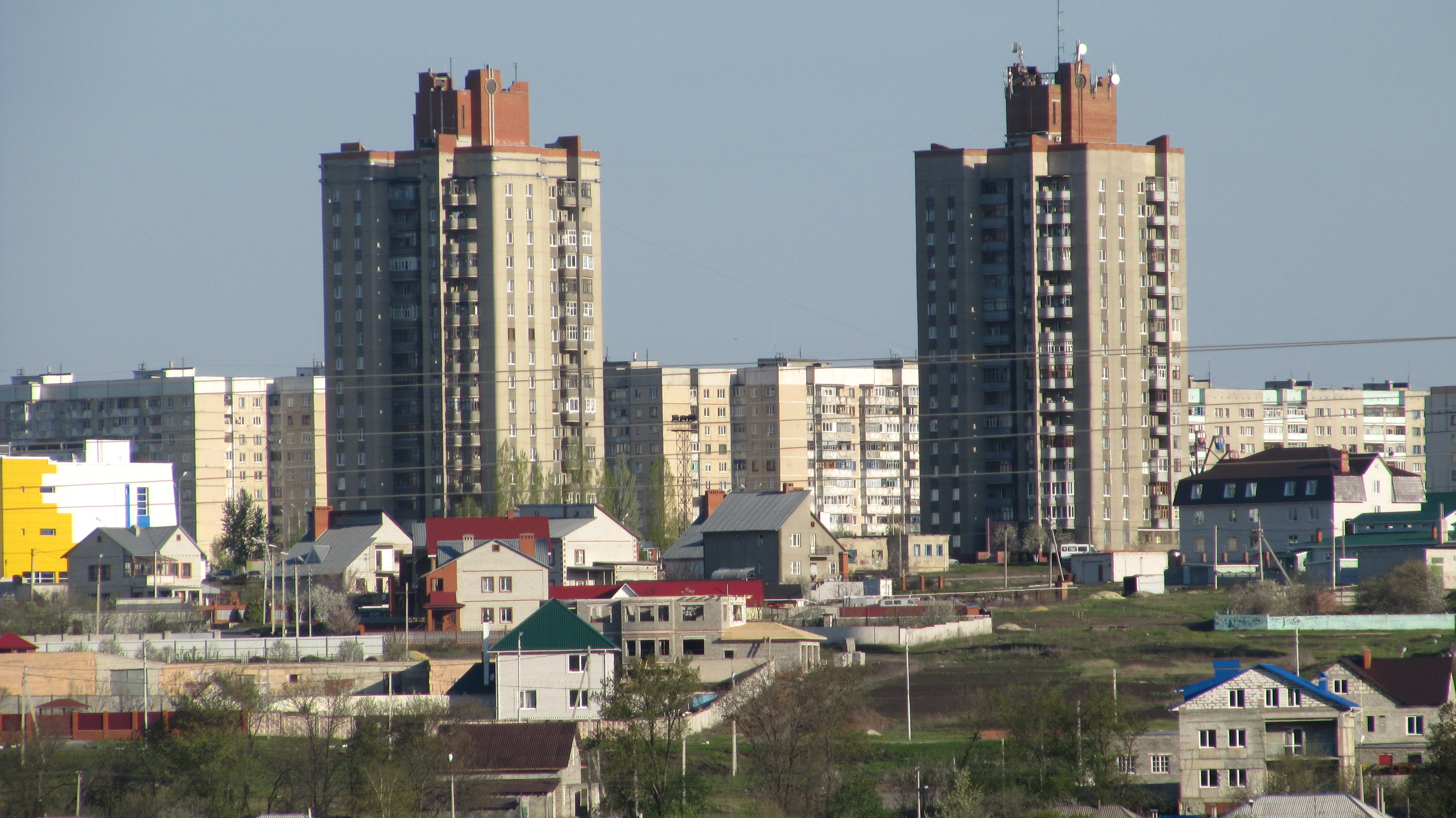

- Flag Coat of arms
- Interactive map of Gubkin
- Location of Gubkin Gubkin (Belgorod Oblast)
- Coordinates: 51°16′58″N 37°32′07″E
- Country: Russia
- Federal subject: Belgorod Oblast
- Founded: 1930s
- Town status since: December 23, 1955
- Elevation: 180 m (590 ft)

Population (2010 Census)
  - Total: 88,560
  - Estimate (2025): 83,150 (−6.1%)
  - Rank: 190th in 2010

Administrative status
  - Subordinated to: town of oblast significance of Gubkin
  - Capital of: Gubkinsky District, town of oblast significance of Gubkin

Municipal status
  - Urban okrug: Gubkinsky Urban Okrug
  - Capital of: Gubkinsky Urban Okrug
- Time zone: UTC+3 (MSK)
- Postal code: 309180–309193
- OKTMO ID: 14730000001
- Website: www.gubkinadm.ru

Gubkin (Russian: Гу́бкин, IPA: [ˈgupkʲɪn]) is a town in Belgorod Oblast, Russia, located 138 kilometers (86 mi) northeast of Belgorod on the Oskolets River, a tributary of the Oskol River. Population: 85,225 (2021 census); 88,560 (2010 census); 86,083 (2002 census); 73,848 (1989 Soviet census).

== History ==
It was founded in the 1930s in place of the village of Korobkovo and named after geologist Ivan Gubkin. In 1939, it was granted urban-type settlement status. Town status was granted to it on December 23, 1955. It was elevated in status to that of a town of oblast significance on March 7, 1960.

== Administrative and municipal status ==
Within the framework of administrative divisions, Gubkin serves as the administrative center of Gubkinsky District, even though it is not a part of it. As an administrative division, it is incorporated separately as the town of oblast significance of Gubkin—an administrative unit with the status equal to that of the districts. As a municipal division, the territories of the town of oblast significance of Gubkin and of Gubkinsky District are incorporated as Gubkinsky Urban Okrug.
