= Gubkinsky District =

Gubkinsky District Губкинский район (Russian)
- District
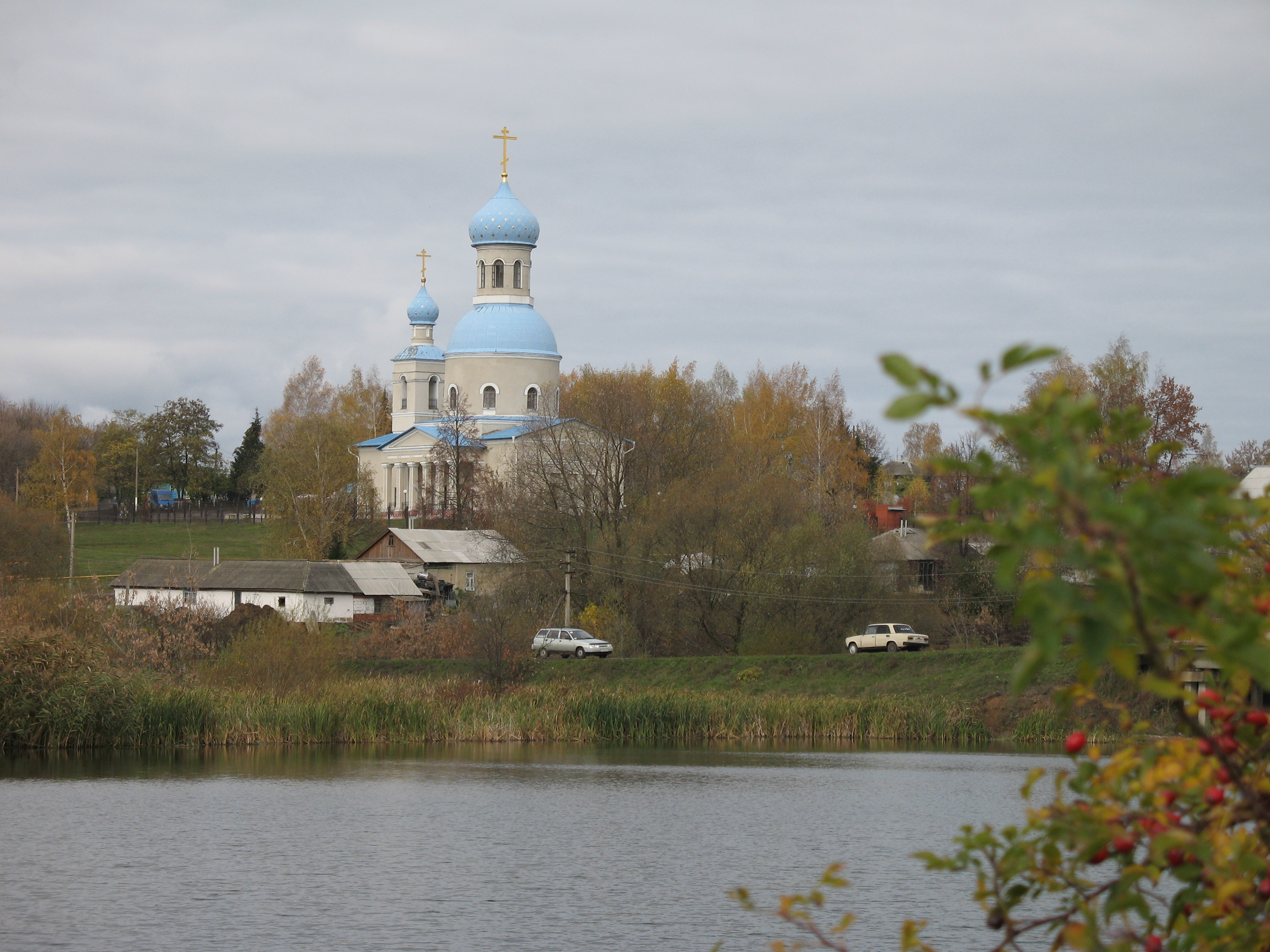
- Arkhangelsk Church, Arkhangelsk Village, Gubkinsky District

- Flag Coat of arms
- Location of Gubkinsky District in Belgorod Oblast
- Coordinates: 51.169°N 37.106°E
- Country: Russia
- Federal subject: Belgorod Oblast
- Established: January 12, 1965
- Administrative center: Gubkin

Population (2010 Census)
  - Total: 33,561
  - Urban: 0%
  - Rural: 100%

Administrative structure
  - Inhabited localities: 97 rural localities

Municipal structure
  - Municipally incorporated as: Gubkinsky Urban Okrug

Gubkinsky District (Russian: Гу́бкинский райо́н) is an administrative district (raion), one of the twenty-one in Belgorod Oblast, Russia. It is located in the north of the oblast. Its administrative center is the town of Gubkin (which is not administratively a part of the district). Population: 33,561 (2010 census); 33,974 (2002 Census); 33,809 (1989 Soviet census).

== History ==
The district was established on January 12, 1965.

== Administrative and municipal status ==
Within the framework of administrative divisions, Gubkinsky District is one of the twenty-one in the oblast. The town of Gubkin serves as its administrative center, despite being incorporated separately as a town of oblast significance—an administrative unit with the status equal to that of the districts.

As a municipal division, the territory of the district and the territory of the town of oblast significance of Gubkin are incorporated together as Gubkinsky Urban Okrug.
