= Skarżyński =

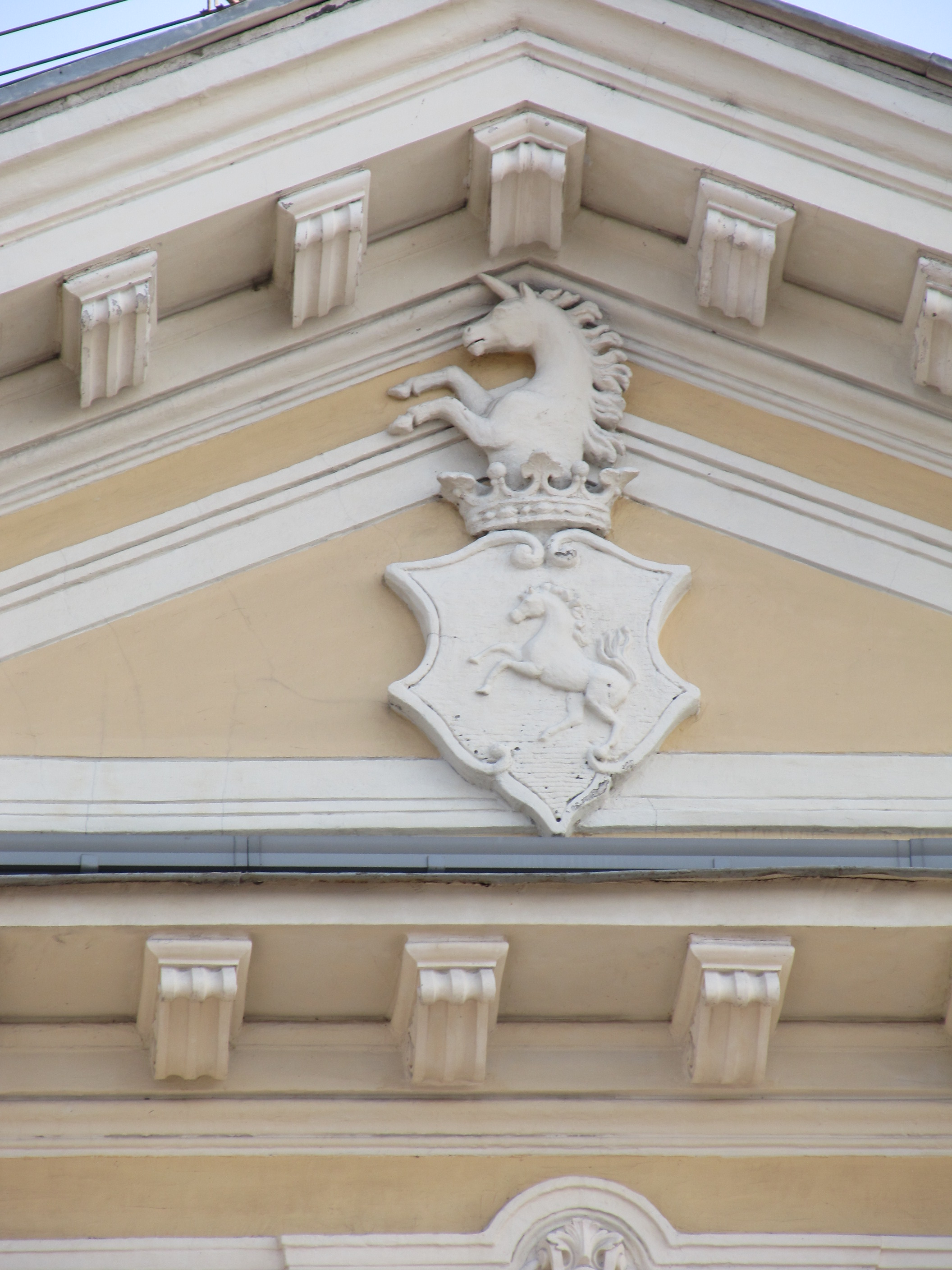
Skarzhinsky Coat of Arms on the mansion of Viktor Viktorovich Skarzhinsky in Saint Petersburg, Russia.

The Skarżyński family (Ukrainian: Скаржинський, romanized: Skarzhyns'kyy; Belarusian: Скаржынскі, romanized: Skaržynski; Russian: Скаржинский, romanized: Skarzhinskiy) was an ancient noble Slavic family in the Grand Duchy of Lithuania, the Polish–Lithuanian Commonwealth, Russian and First French Empires. The family descends from the Olgovichi of the Rurik dynasty on a collateral line. They are also the relatives of Natalya Naryshkina who is the mother of Tsar Peter I of Russia. This makes the Skarzhinsky family blood relatives of the House of Romanov.The Skarzynski family has a very complex ancestral heritage with the family having multiple branches throughout Europe. One branch of the family was Cossack. This branch would form three lineages in Lubny, Chernihiv, and Kherson in Ukraine. The Skarżyński family originates from Trakai Voivodeship, Grand Duchy of Lithuania with strong ancestral ties to the Principality of Turov, Poland, Ukraine, Belarus, and the Upper Oka Principalities. Other branches of the family have origins in the territories that were once known as Prussia. Records indicate a strong presence in Mazovia. The family has a deep military tradition. The Orthodox branch of the Skarzhinsky family played a prominent role in the history of Russia, and Ukraine. The Russian branch of the family holding the highest status of nobility. The family has become well represented spreading all over the world especially Europe and the United States.

The Skarzynski family have had a strong presence in the Grodno Region, Belarus and Pinsk District, Brest Region, Belarus since the 1600s. The Skarzynski family is from the same genus as the noble Russian bloodlines of Baryatinsky, Obolensky, Shcherbatov, Dolgorukov, Repnin and Volkonsky. They are the descendants of Chernigov Prince Oleg Svyatoslavich founder of the Olgovichi. This would put the Skarzhinsky families initial origins most likely in Polesia, Novgorod, Rostov, Yaroslavl Oblast or Pskov. The family is of Bończa coat of arms. The family has many branches all over Eastern Europe. Since the early 1600s, the Skarzhinsky family owned land in the Turov Voivodeship. The family also owned land in the Pyetrykaw District, Gomel Region, Belarus. The Orthodox branch of the Skarzhinsky family belonged to the richest land owning Russian nobility and played a prominent role in the history of Russia, and Ukraine. They owned thousands of acres of land throughout the territory of the Russian Empire from western Belarus to central and southern regions of Ukraine. The family owned hundreds of acres of land in Mglin, Russia where Alexander Matveyevich Skarzhinsky was leader of the Mglinsky nobility. His ancestor Anastasy Ivanovich Skarzhinsky was the founder of the Bryansk Oblast branch of the Skarzhinsky family. The family also owned land in the folwark estate in Kamenka near Ashmyany, Belarus. The family set forth a detailed history of the members of family for the purpose of establishing themselves in the nobility at the Ashmyany City Court. The Skarżyńskis also owned land in Paszkiszki village, Grodno Region, Belarus. There is a Skarzhinsky branch in Minsk, Belarus. The Skarżyńskis also had a strong presence in Vilnius Region, Lithuania.

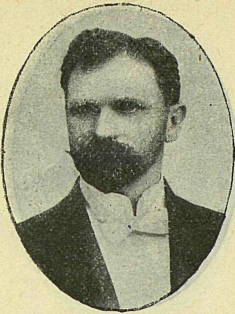
Tadeusz Mieczysław Skarżyński, A member of the Second Russian State Duma, 1907

The Skarżyńskis also owned land in Kherson Governorate, Ukraine. A branch of the Skarzhinsky family owned the county of Elisavetgrad uezd in the Kherson Governorate of the Russian Empire until 1909. Trikraty, Ukraine was originally named Velyka Skarzhynka in honor of noble Viktor Petrovich Skarzhinsky. The Skarzhynskis also had branches in Poltava, Chernihiv, Odessa, Kiev, Mykolaiv, Cherkasy, and along the Dnieper in many villiages. Another branch of the family was established in Khmelnytskyi, Ukraine. The family has also had a strong presence in Saint Petersburg, Russia, Moscow, Russia, Bryansk Oblast, and the Caucasus. The family owned a gothic style mansion in Kislovodsk, Russia. Another Skarzynski branch resided in Germany. The genus is still strongly represented throughout Poland, Russia, Ukraine, Belarus, England, France, and the United States. The family has a history of nobility in Poland, Lithuania, France, Ukraine, Russia, and Belarus. The Catholic branch of the Skarzynski family played a significant role in the history of Poland and France. Two members of the family, General Ambroży Mikołaj Skarżyński and Generał Kazimierz Skarzynski, served in the First French Empire's Grande Armée under the leadership of French Emperor Napoleon Bonaparte. The two Skarzynski brothers were awarded French decorations Chevalier de l'Empire and Legion of Honour for their service to France.

Colonel Stanisław Skarżyński was a legendary pilot in the Polish Air Force. Initially he was an infantryman in the Polish army. He would have a highly decorated military career. He was also decorated with the French decoration Legion of Honour.

Another branch of the family took Russian citizenship after the partitions of Poland, but remained Polish and Catholic. Also, some Skarzhinsky Catholics after the Partitions turned out to be subjects of Prussia.

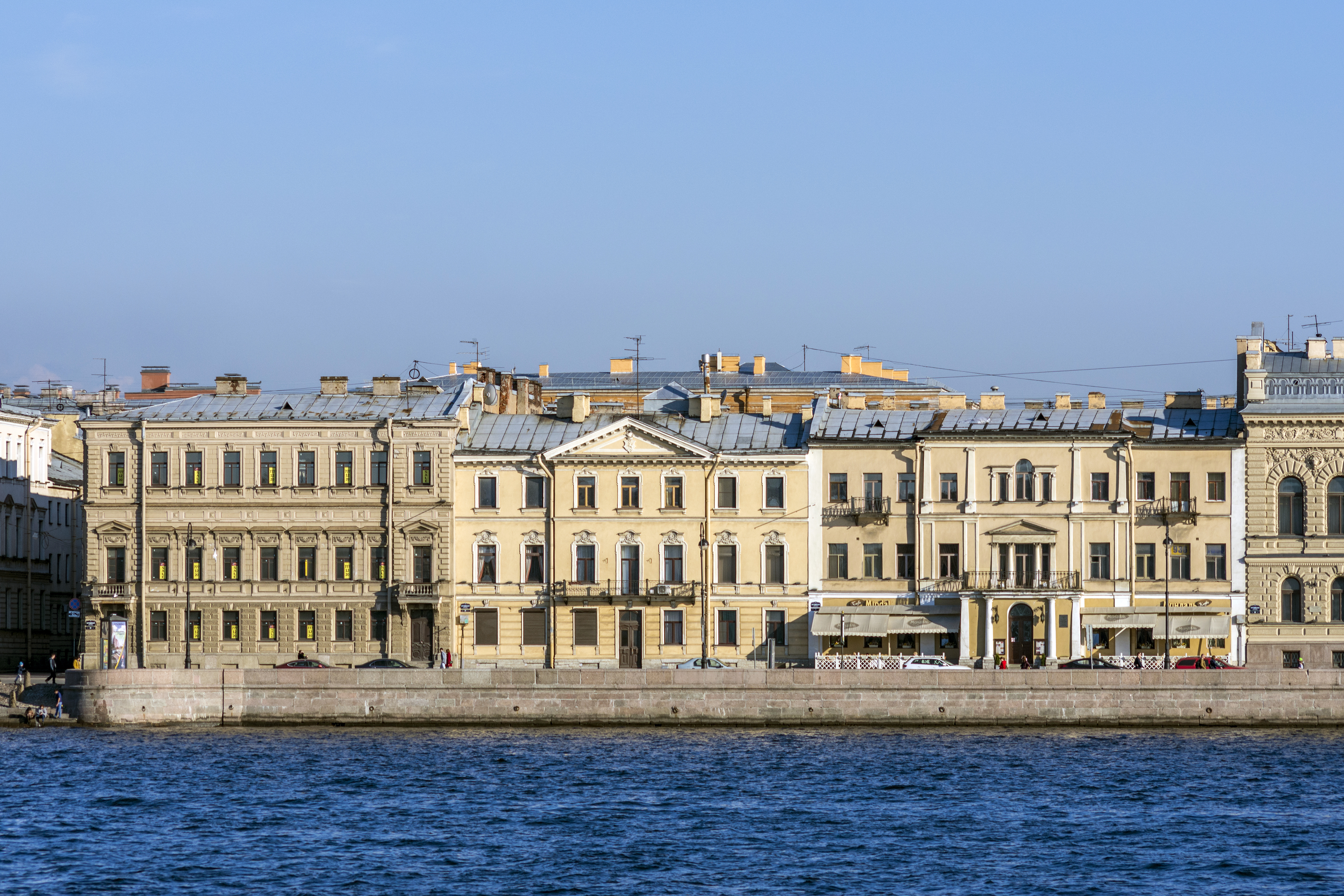
House of Russian noble Viktor Viktorovich Skarzhinsky on the English Embankment in Saint Petersburg, Russia.

In 1820, the Vilnius herald recognized several of the Skarżyńskis "as native and ancient Polish nobility", bringing their names to the first part of the gubernial books of nobility. In 1844, the Vilnius herald recorded in the Trakai district Ignacy other members of the Skarżyński family.

The Skarzynski family is also listed in Part 12, page 68 of the General Armorial of the Noble Families of the All Russian Empire.

The family intermarried with many noble Ukrainian officer families of the 18th — 19th centuries, in particular, such as the Bezborodko, Skoropadsky, Zakrevsky, Znachko-Yavorsky, Miloradovich, Miklashevsky, Bakurinsky, Sudienko, Novitsky, Polubotok, Kochubey families and others.

The Skarzhinsky are also intermarried to ancient Russian noble families of Senyukov, Stroganov, Dolgorukov, Terekhov, Opochinin, and Naryshkin.

Anastasiy Ivanovich Skarzhinsy began civil service in 1794. In 1828, he became the Mglinsky district treasurer. He lived in Mglin, Russia.

Matvey Ivanovich Skarzhinsky, who began his civil service in 1788, was promoted to titular councilor in 1815, was awarded the Order of St. Vladimir of the 4th class.

In the late 1800s, Alexander Matveyevich Skarzhinsky, at the age of 28, became the Leader of the Mglinsky nobility.

In 1900, the Skarzhinsky brothers Matvey, Vasily and Ivan jointly owned 779 acres of land in the Mglinsky District, Russia.

Some members of the Skarzhinsky family were politicians. Tadeusz Mieczysław Skarżyński was a member of the Second Russian State Duma in 1907. Pyotr Mikhailovich Skarzhinsky would become governor of Caucasian Governorate 1793-1796. Viktor Pyotrovich Skarzhinsky was Provincial Leader of the Nobility in Kherson. Pyotr Vasilyevich Skarzhinsky was Governor of Volyn.

Pavel Matveevich Skarzhinsky served in the judicial department of Kharkov, Ukraine.

Some descendants of the Skarzhinsky/Skarżyński bloodline, in the United States, carry the surname of Stephenson.

== Origin and history ==
The family originated in the Trakai Voivodeship of the Grand Duchy of Lithuania. Other branches of the family have origins in Prussia. Records indicate a strong presence in Mazovia. They are the descendants of the Russian Princes of Chernigov. The family descends from the Olgovichi branch. The family has branches or estates in Żuków, Chodaków, Drozdy, Konarów, Brzeziny, Sochaczew, Rypin, Sierpc, Gójsk, and Szczutowo in Poland. Jan Skarzynski founded Skarzyn, Masovian Voivodeship in the early 1400s. The family was granted the land on a knightly right from Bolesław IV, Prince of Mazovia. Other family members have roots in Saint Petersburg, Russia and Moscow, Russia. Marcin Skarżyński, in the 1600s, owned a lot of land in Trakai District, Lithuania. The family has a deep military tradition serving Prussia, Poland, France, Russian Empire, Germany, and the Soviet Union with some family members being highly ranked and highly decorated as well. The Skarżyński family produced at least five high-ranking generals that served Poland, France, and the Russian Empire. One relative of Skarzhinsky being Mikhail Miloradovich who played a prominent role in the defeat of Napoleon during the Patriotic War of 1812. Many family members who served the Soviet Union were officers or NCOs. Most of them serving in famous major battles on the eastern front of World War Two.

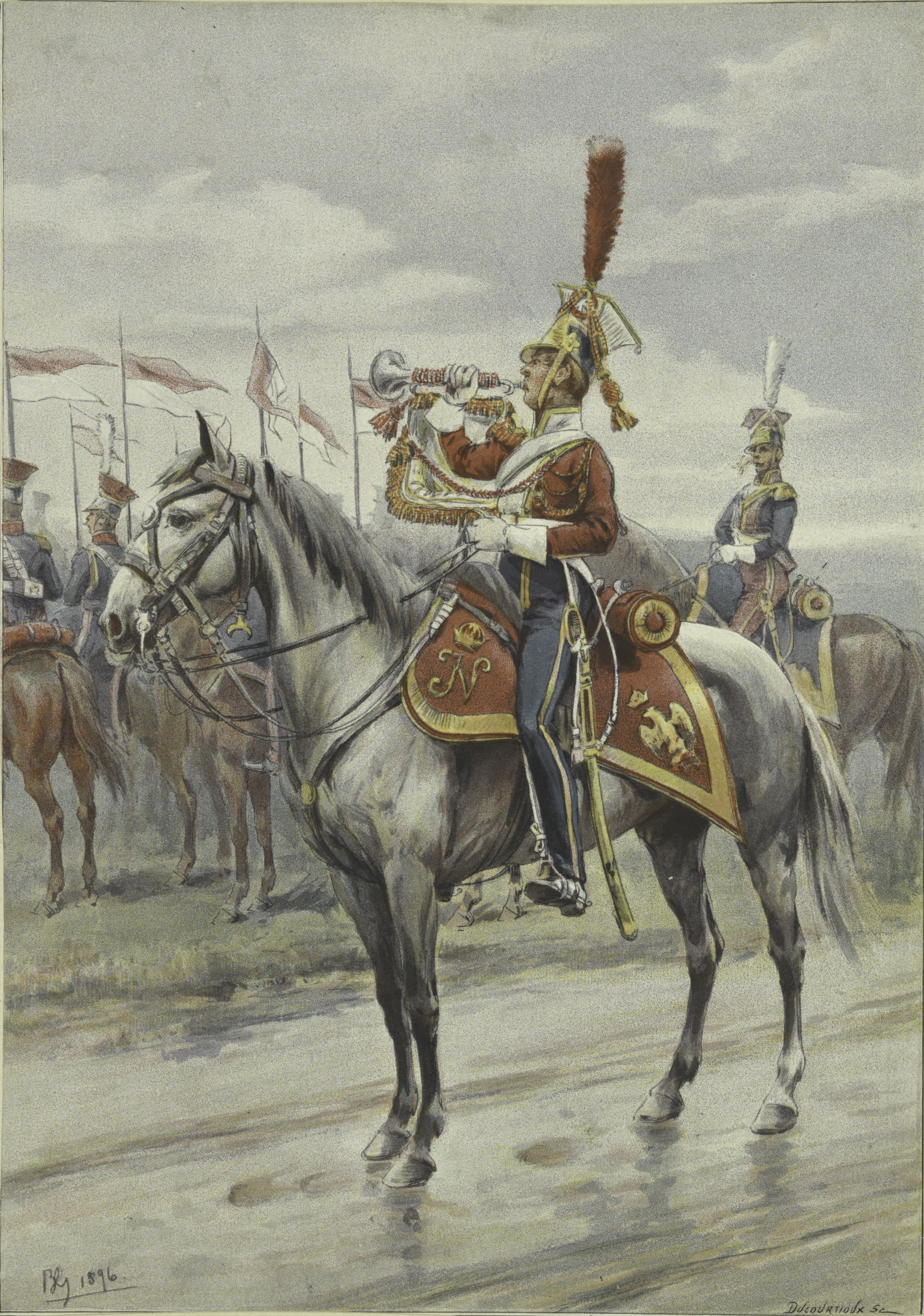
French Officer Ambroży Mikołaj Skarżyński was commander of the 3rd Lithuanian Light Cavalry Lancer Regiment of the French Imperial Guard during Napoleon's Russian Campaign.

== Russian military service ==
The Skarzhinsky family served the Russian Empire with distinction. Their service brought them admiration from Catherine the Great who rewarded them handsomely for their service.

Mikhail Kazimierz Skarzhinsky entered Russian military service in 1733. Mikhail was a centurion of the 1st Lubny Regimental Hundred (1737-1750) as a language translator.

Mikhail Mikhailovich Skarzhinsky (1742 - 1804) began his service in 1761 as a military clerk, a centurion of the 2nd Lubny regimental hundred (1765-1773), from 1783 onward a bunchuk comrade of the Lubny regiment.

Ivan Mikhailovich Skarzhinsky (1749 - 1806?) began his service in 1769 as a clerk, a cornet of the Lubny Regimental Hundred (1773 - 1787), Zolotonosha District Marshal of the Nobility, since 1780 a Bunchuk comrade. He was married to Elena Grigorievna Zakrevskaya.

Major General Pyotr Mikhailovich Skarzhinsky(1747 - 1805) was born in the Poltava region and devoted his life to military service. General Pyotr Mikhailovich Skarzhinsky would be decorated with the Order of St. Vladimir of the 2nd degree and the Order of St. George of the 4th degree which was the highest military decoration of the Russian Empire. In 1787, Pyotr Skarzhinsky showed extraordinary courage when, in early October, Suvorov's troops defeated the Turks, taking the fortress near Ochakov. The commander of the 2nd Bug Regiment, Colonel Pyotr Mikhailovich Skarzhinsky, was seriously wounded in the chest. Having recovered from his wounds, a year later he again distinguished himself under the banner of Suvorov during the assault on Ochakov, for which he was awarded the Order of St. George. He was also Commander of the Astrakhan Cossack Regiment. He served in the Russian-Turkish war of 1768-1774 and the Russian-Turkish war of 1787-1791. He would later become the Governor of Caucasian Governorate 1793-1796. In 1775, Pyotr Mikhailovich Skarzhinsky received from Catherine the Great more than 6000 acres of land in the Russian Empire for his service to Russia. There was also a monument to Pyotr in Odessa.

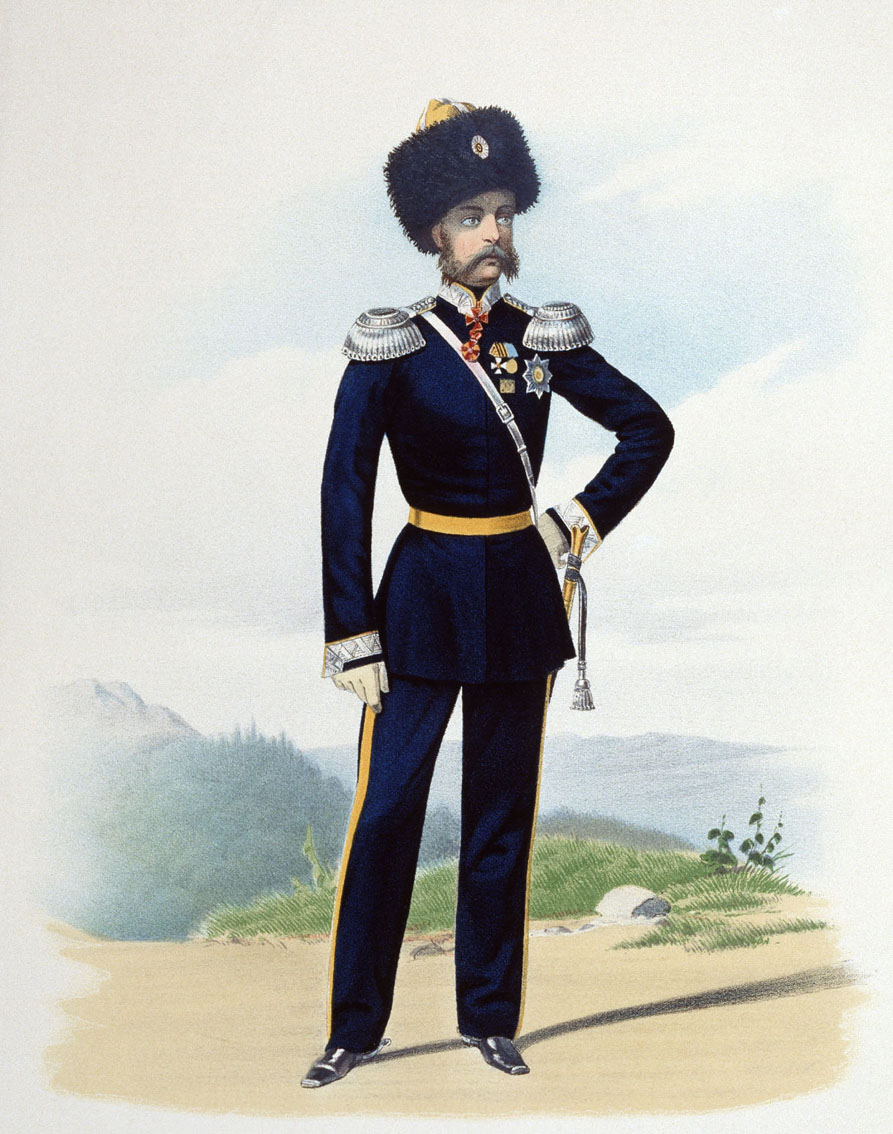
A soldier of the Astrakhan Cossack Army. Major General Pyotr Mikhailovich Skarzhinsky was a highly decorated commander of the Astrakhan Cossack Army.

French Imperial Coat of Arms. General Ambroży Mikołaj Skarżyński would be awarded with the title of Baron and Chevalier de l'Empire by legendary French military and political leader Napoleon Bonaparte. Generał Kazimierz Jerzego Skarzynski and Colonel Stanisław Skarżyński would be decorated with the Legion of Honour.

Mikhail Mikhailovich Skarzhinsky (1742 - 1804) began his Russian military service in 1761 as a military clerk, centurion of the 2nd Lubensky Regimental Hundred (1765-1773), from 1783 a bunchuk-comrade of the Lubensky regiment.

Ivan Mikhailovich Skarzhinsky (1749 - 1806?) began his Russian military service in 1769 as a clerk, cornet of the regimental Lubensky hundred (1773 - 1787), Zolotonosha district leader of the nobility and since 1780 Bunchuk comrade.

Nikolai Petrovich Skarzhinsky- second lieutenant of the Life Guards of the Izmailovsky Regiment, mortally wounded in the battle of Kulm (August 17, 1813), his name is listed on one of the marble plaques on the walls of the Cathedral of Christ the Savior in Moscow. For the Battle of Borodino, Nikolai Skarzhinsky received a high award - a golden sword with the inscription "For bravery", as well as promotion to the rank of second lieutenant.

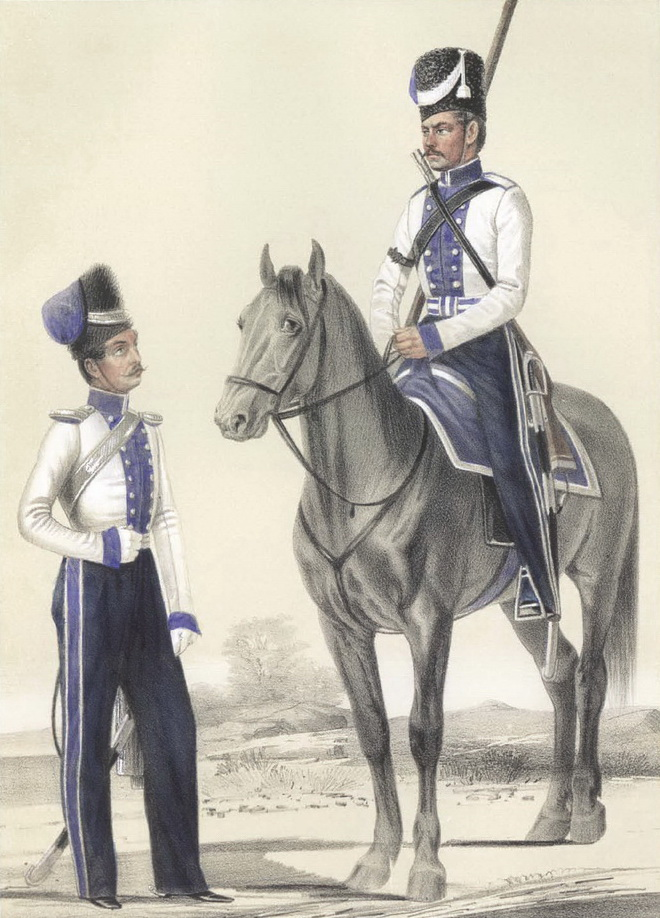
Officer and Cossack of the Squadron of Viktor Petrovich Skarzhinsky during the Patriotic War of 1812. Skarzhinsky's Squadron was immortalized on plate 27 on the wall of the old Cathedral of Christ the Savior in Moscow.

During the Patriotic War of 1812, Viktor Petrovich Skarzhinsky was one of the first to form a militia of peasants, arming at his own expense a detachment of about 111 people, who replenished the number of light cavalry squadrons with volunteers. It was called Skarzhinsky's Squadron. Initially the Squadron performed reconnaissance in the areas around the towns of Priluki and Samokhvalovka along with Don Cossacks. They covered almost 240 miles prior to being assigned to the Russian Army. And in the fall, the Squadron under the command of 24-year-old Viktor Petrovich Skarzhinsky joined the Southern Army. It played a significant role driving Napoleon's army out of Europe serving in the battles of Lahoysk, Orsha, and Borisov, Belarus. On 17 November 1812 Skarzhinsky's Squadron defeated multiple units of French troops in the town of Pleshchenitsa. On 19 November 1812 the Squadron played a role in the liberation of Molodechno. On 21 November 1812 the Squadron took part in the assault on Borisov, Belarus. Heavy losses were inflicted on Polish and Lithuanian troops defending the city amounting to around 3,000 casualties. The Squadron captured two artillery guns during this particular battle. Skarzhinsky's Squadron took part in battles at Elijah, Preny, Iglishki, Mikhalishki, Góra Kalwaria, Wilkowiszki, Lyudinovo, and Prudnik during the month of December of the same year. Skarzhinsky's Squadron especially distinguished itself during the capture of Vilnius on December 10, 1812, when about 15,000 French soldiers (including 7 generals and 242 officers) were captured. The soldiers of the Skarzhinsky squadron captured 18 French officers. At the end of October 1812, Field Marshall Kutuzov, in a letter to Emperor Alexander I, called the deeds of Viktor Petrovich and his volunteers "a true feat, both civil and military, worthy of all praise and awards..." Viktor Petrovich Skarzhinsky was awarded two orders for bravery, including the Order of St. Vladimir with bows. He was also awarded the Order of St. Anna II degree with diamonds. The final battle for Skarzhinsky's Squadron would be the fortress of Thorn(Turon) where 3,620 enemy troops were garrisoned. The Squadron took part in repelling enemy sorties from the fortress in February 1813. The memory of the squadron is noted in the main temple of the Russian Orthodox Church – the Church of Christ the Redeemer in Moscow. In this temple, erected in memory of soldiers who died in World War II, marble plaques with the names of military formations are installed on the walls. On plate 27, among others, the squadron of Viktor Petrovich Skarzhinsky is immortalized on a marble plaque.

Viktor Petrovich Skarzhinsky, Russian Cavalry Commander of the Patriotic War of 1812.

In 1820, Viktor Petrovich Skarzhinsky was elected Provincial Leader of the Nobility of the Kherson Governorate for six years. On June 16, 1872, a monument to Viktor P. Skarzhinsky was solemnly unveiled in the Odessa City Garden to commemorate his great services to Russia. Created of white marble, it stood until the 30s of the last century.

The Skarzynski line produced two other Russian Major Generals Vasily Anastasievich Skarzhinsky(1834-1914) and Nikolai Georgievich Skarzhinsky(1849-1910).

In 1900, brothers Alexander and Pavel Skarzhinsky jointly owned 665 acres of land in the Mglinsky district, Russia.

During World War 1, Russian soldier Lieutenant Ignatiy Skarzhinsky was awarded the Order of Saint Anna IV degree with the inscription "For bravery", Order of Saint Vladimir, Equal-to-the-Apostles, IV degree with swords and bow. He served in the 150th Taman Infantry Regiment.

During World War 1, Russian soldier Lieutenant Anastasiy Skarzhinsky was awarded the Order of Saint Catherine and the Order of Saint Anna of the II degree. He served in the Kyiv Military District.

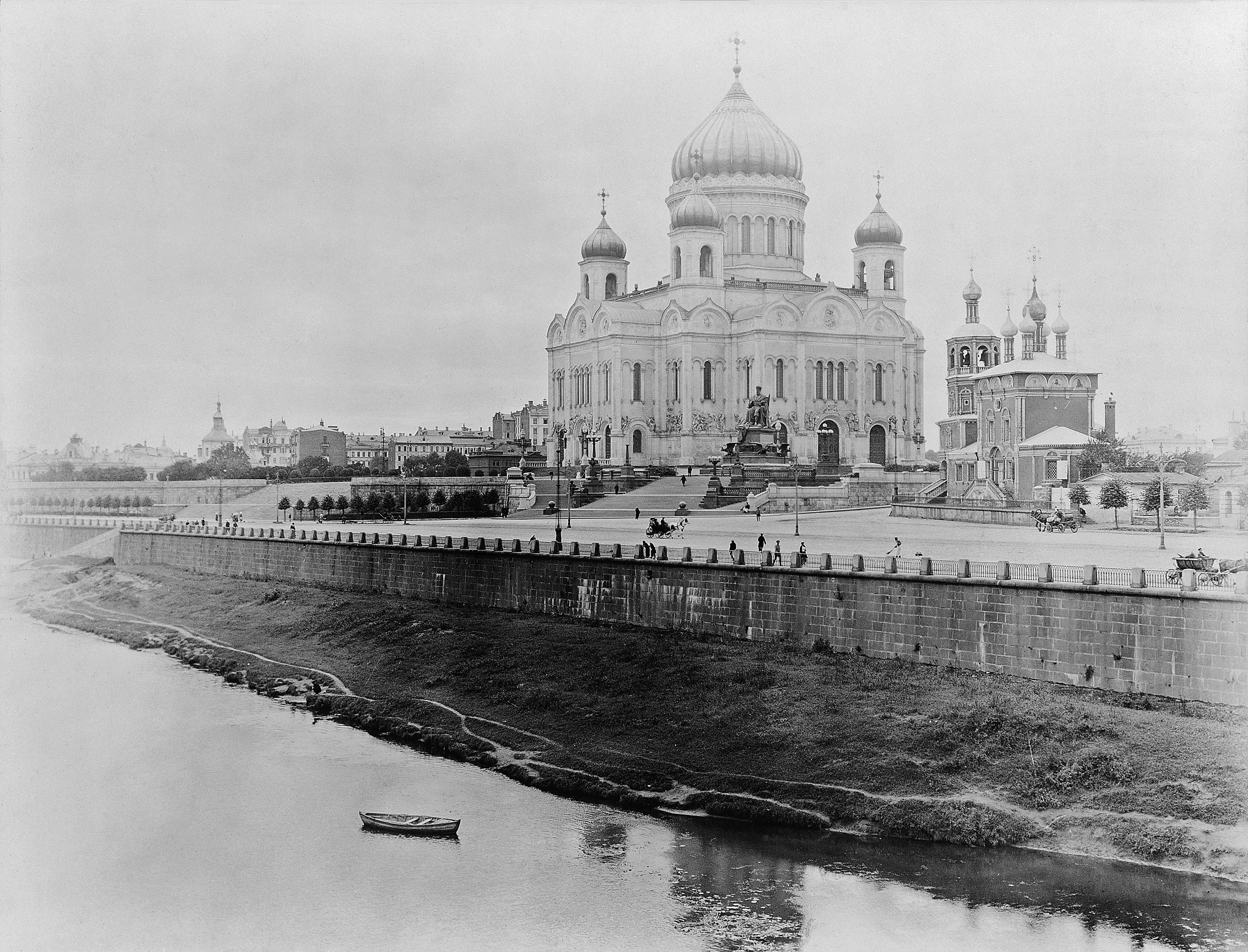
Russian Lieutenant Nikolai Petrovich Skarzhinsky and Commander Viktor Petrovich Skarzhinsky were immortalized on marble plaques on the walls of the old Cathedral of Christ the Savior in Moscow.

During World War 1, Russian soldier Vasiliy Skarzhinsky was awarded the Order of Saint Stanislaus III class and the Order of Saint Catherine. He served in the Russian 44th Army Corps.

During World War 1, Russian soldier Bronislav Skarzhinsky was awarded Order of Saint Catherine and Order of Saint Stanislaus III degree.

During World War Two, Soviet soldier Nikolay Vladimirovich Skarzhinsky was awarded the Order of Glory, for bravery, during combat operations.

During World War Two, Soviet soldier Private Timofey Aleksandrovich Skarzhinsky was declared missing in action during combat.

During World War Two, Soviet soldier Ivan Zakharovich Skarzhinsky took part in the Battle of Berlin. He was killed in action.

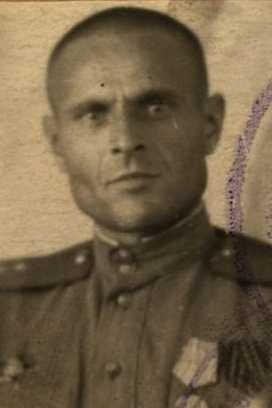
Soviet soldier Captain Ivan Aleksandrovich Skarzhinskiy who was wounded at the Battle of Moscow during World War Two.

During World War Two, Soviet soldier Senior Lieutenant Matvey Isaakovich Skarzhinsky was awarded the military decoration Medal "For Battle Merit", Medal "For the Capture of Budapest", Order of the Patriotic War, II degree, and the Medal "For the Victory over Germany in the Great Patriotic War 1941–1945" during World War Two. He served in the Red Army's 333rd Rifle Division and 84th Rifle Division.

During World War Two, Soviet soldier Vsevolod Vladimirovich Skarzhinsky was awarded the Order of the Red Star and the Medal "For Courage."

During World War Two, Soviet soldier Lieutenant Colonel Stanislav Yanovich Skarzhinsky was awarded the Order of the Red Star and Medal "For Battle Merit" during World War Two. He served in the Red Army's 4th Rifle Division (Soviet Union). He served at the Battle of Berlin. Prior to that he participated in the liberation of Warsaw.

Soviet Marine Corporal Grigoriy Vasilevich Skarzhinsky served at the Siege of Leningrad during World War Two with the 260th Separate Marine Brigade. He was awarded Medal "For the Defense of Leningrad" and listed in the Book of Memory of the Siege of Leningrad.

In 1944, Soviet soldier Junior Lieutenant Dmitriy Frantsevich Skarzhinsky was awarded Order of the Red Star and the Order of the Patriotic War, First Class.

During World War Two, Soviet soldier Sergeant Major Nikolay Ivanovich Skarzhinsky was awarded military decorations Medal "For Courage"", Order of the Red Star (3), and Order of Glory 3rd degree while serving with the 338th Guards Rifle Regiment of the 117th Guards Rifle Division, 1st Ukrainian Front.

During World War Two, Soviet soldier Colonel Evgeniy Ignatievich Skarzhinsky was awarded the Order of the Red Banner three times, Order of Red Star three times, and the Medal "For Military Merit" two times. He served in the Battle of Stalingrad, Belgrade offensive and Siege of Budapest.

In 1945, Soviet soldier Junior Sergeant Anatoly Ivanovich Skarzhinsky was awarded military decoration Medal "For Courage" (Russia). Anatoly captured 42 Nazi soldiers during a combat operation. He took part in the Battle of the Dnieper and the Battle of Kiev (1943).

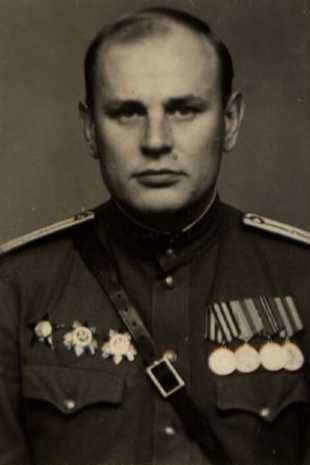
Soviet soldier Lieutenant Colonel Stanislav Yanovich Skarzhinsky who was decorated with the Order of the Red Star during World War Two.

During World War Two, Soviet soldier Ivan Filippovich Skarzhinsky was awarded combat decoration Medal "For Battle Merit". He served with the 1st Ukrainian Front, 95th Guards Rifle Division. He participated in many of the major battles of the Eastern Front including the Battle of Berlin. He also served in the largest tank battle in history known as the Battle of Kursk and the famous Battle of Prokhorovka.

During World War Two, Soviet soldier Captain Ivan Aleksandrovich Skarzhinsky served in the 1st Guards Motor Rifle Division. He participated at the Battle for Moscow among others. He was wounded in battle. He also participated in the Continuation War against Finland. He also served in the Petsamo–Kirkenes offensive as part of the Soviet 14th Army.

During World War Two, Soviet soldier Private Ivan Romanovich Skarzhinsky was killed during combat operations while serving in the Soviet 214th Rifle Division.

During World War Two, Soviet Senior Sergeant Vladimir Igorovich Skarzhinsky served with the 46th Guards Rifle Division. He was awarded Order of Glory Third Class, Medal "For Courage", and Medal "For the Victory over Germany in the Great Patriotic War of 1941–1945." He served in Operation Bagration. During this operation, the Soviet Union would destroy 28 German divisions which led to the destruction of German Army Group Center. It is the largest defeat in German military history.

During World War Two, Soviet Junior Sergeant Lavrentiy Lukich Skarzhinsky was award military decoration Order of the Red Star while serving with the 1st Ukrainian Front participating in many major combat operations including the Battle of Berlin. He served under legendary Soviet generals Georgy Zhukov and Ivan Konev.

During World War Two, Soviet soldier Luka A. Skarzhinsky served in the Soviet Union's 6th Guards Army. He served at the Battle of Kursk, Belgorod-Kharkov Offensive, Operation Bagration and Courland Pocket.

During World War Two, Soviet soldier Private Mikhail Grigorevich Skarzhinsky served with the Soviet Union's 81st Howitzer Regiment.

During World War Two, Red Army soldier Vasiliy Semenovich Skarzhinsky served with the Soviet 15th Reconnaissance Reserve Aviation Regiment. He is missing in action.

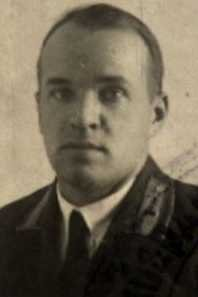
Soviet soldier Colonel Evgeniy Ignatievich Skarzhinsky served at the Battle of Stalingrad during World War Two.

During World War Two, Soviet soldier Private Anatoly Sidorovich Skarzhinsky was taken prisoner, during combat operations, by German forces.

During World War Two, Corporal Zygmunt Antonovich Skarzhinsky served with the 1st Tadeusz Kościuszko Infantry Division, First Polish Army (1944–1945) where he would be killed during combat operations that liberated Warsaw.

During World War Two, Soviet Marine Pavel Ivanovich Skarzhinsky served with the Soviet Black Sea Fleet. He went missing in action during the Siege of Sevastopol (1941–1942)

During World War Two, Soviet soldier Private Viktor Pavlovich Skarzhinsky would be captured by German forces while serving with the Soviet 264th Artillery Regiment. He would eventually be released.

During World War Two, Soviet soldier Sergeant Vladimir Dmitrievich Skarzhinsky was killed in action while serving with the Red Army's 35th Rifle Regiment, 30th Rifle Division(later renamed 55th Guards Rifle Division).

During World War Two, Soviet soldier Private Mikhail Ivanovich Skarzhinsky was killed in action while serving with the Red Army's 327th Rifle Division.

During World War Two, Soviet soldier Anton Lavrentevich Skarzhinsky served at the Siege of Leningrad. He is listed in the Book of Memory of the Siege of Leningrad.

During World War Two, Soviet soldier Corporal Petr Pavlovich Skarzhinsky was awarded the Medal for Courage(2 times) and the Order of the Red Star. He served in the Red Army's 118th Artillery Regiment, 69th Rifle Division. He served in the battle at Kursk and at the battle of Berlin.

During World War Two, Soviet soldier Lieutenant Anton Ivanovich Skarzhinsky served with the 1st Belorussian front. He served in the Red Army's 130th Rifle Division. He was twice awarded the Soviet Military Merit Medal.

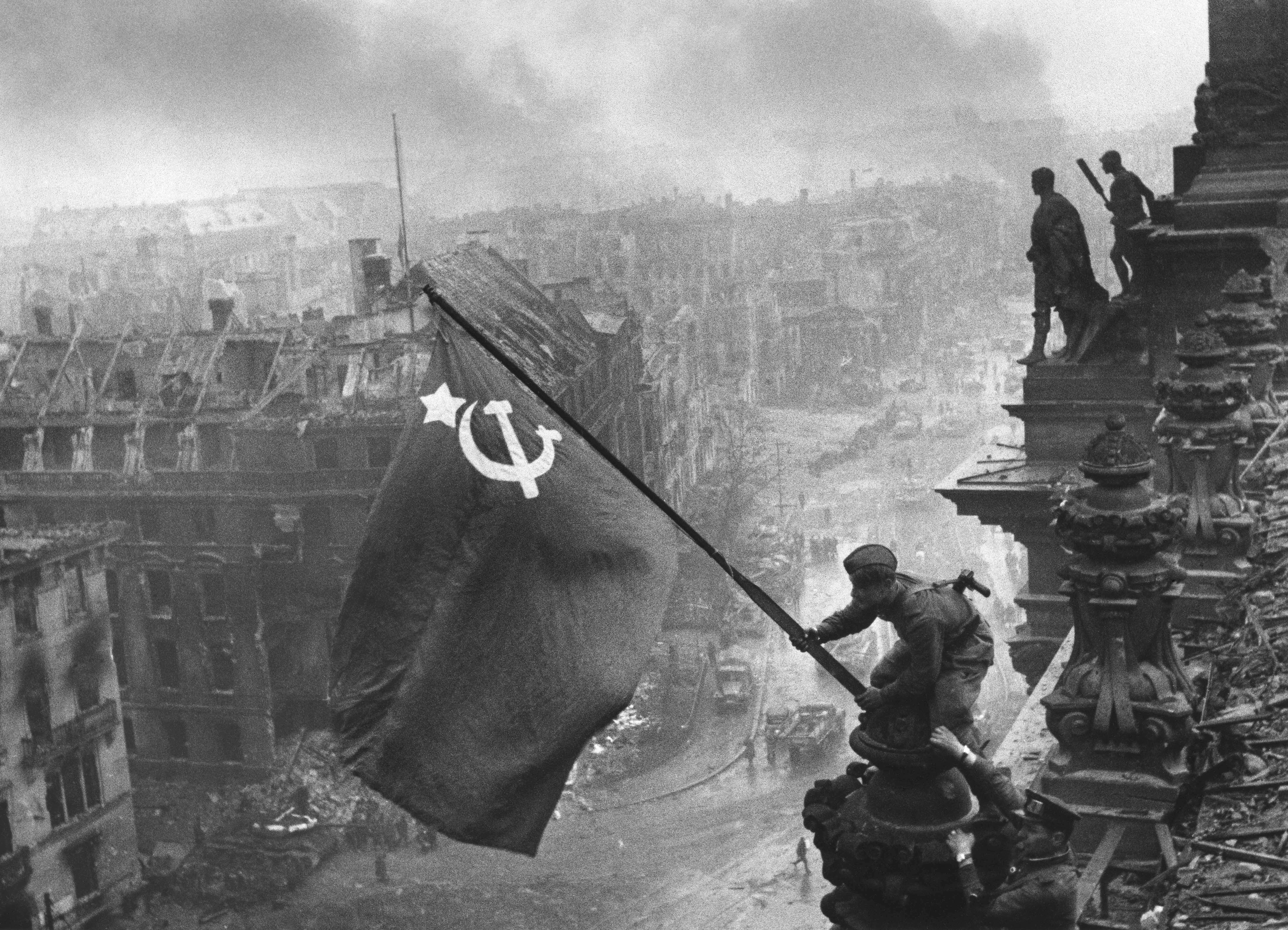
Soviet soldiers Sergeant Major Nikolay Ivanovich Skarzhinsky, Ivan Zakharovich Skarzhinsky, Ivan Filippovich Skarzhinsky, Junior Sergeant Lavrentiy Lukich Skarzhinsky, and Lieutenant Colonel Stanislav Yanovich Skarzhinsky all served in the Battle of Berlin during World War Two. Ivan Zakharovich Skarzhinsky would not survive the battle.

During World War Two, Soviet Private Georgiy Ivanovich Skarzhinsky became a casualty of the war. He is listed as missing in action.

During World War Two, Soviet Sergeant Major Andrey Ilyich Skarzhinsky became a casualty of the war. He is listed as missing in action. He is listed in the Book of Remembrance.

During World War Two, Soviet Ignat Vasilevich Skarzhinsky became a casualty of the war. He is listed as missing in action. He served in the Red Army's 170th Rifle Regiment, 58th Rifle Division and the 108th Rifle Division.

During World War Two, Soviet soldier Private Ivan Nikolaevich Skarzhinsky was awarded the Order of the Patriotic War, II degree.

During World War Two, Soviet soldier Private Adam Vekentyevich Skarzhinsky served with the Red Army's 75th Reserve Rifle Regiment of the 34th Reserve Rifle Division.

During World War Two, Soviet soldier Private Viktor Antonovich Skarzhinsky served in the Red Army's 584th Rifle Regiment, 199th Rifle Division. He was killed during combat operations during Operation Bagration.

During World War Two, Soviet soldier Sergeant Yakov Vasilevich Skarzhinsky was declared missing in action during combat operations in 1944. He was born in Zhytomyr region, Korosten district, Shatrishche village in Ukraine.

During World War Two, Soviet soldier Ivan Ivanovich Skarzhinsky was declared missing in action during combat operations. He was born in Ukrainian SSR, Amur-Nizhnednepropetrovsk district, Dnipro.

During World War Two, Boris Ivanovich Skarzhinsky served in the Soviet Black Sea Fleet.

During World War Two, Soviet soldier Lukyan Lukyanovich Skarzhinsky was declared missing in action while serving with the Soviet Red Army's 76th Infantry Division during combat operations.

During World War Two, Dmitry Fedorovich Skarzhinsky was awarded the Order of the Red Banner of Labour for the efficient production of armaments as the chief engineer of the plant No 69.

== Polish military service ==
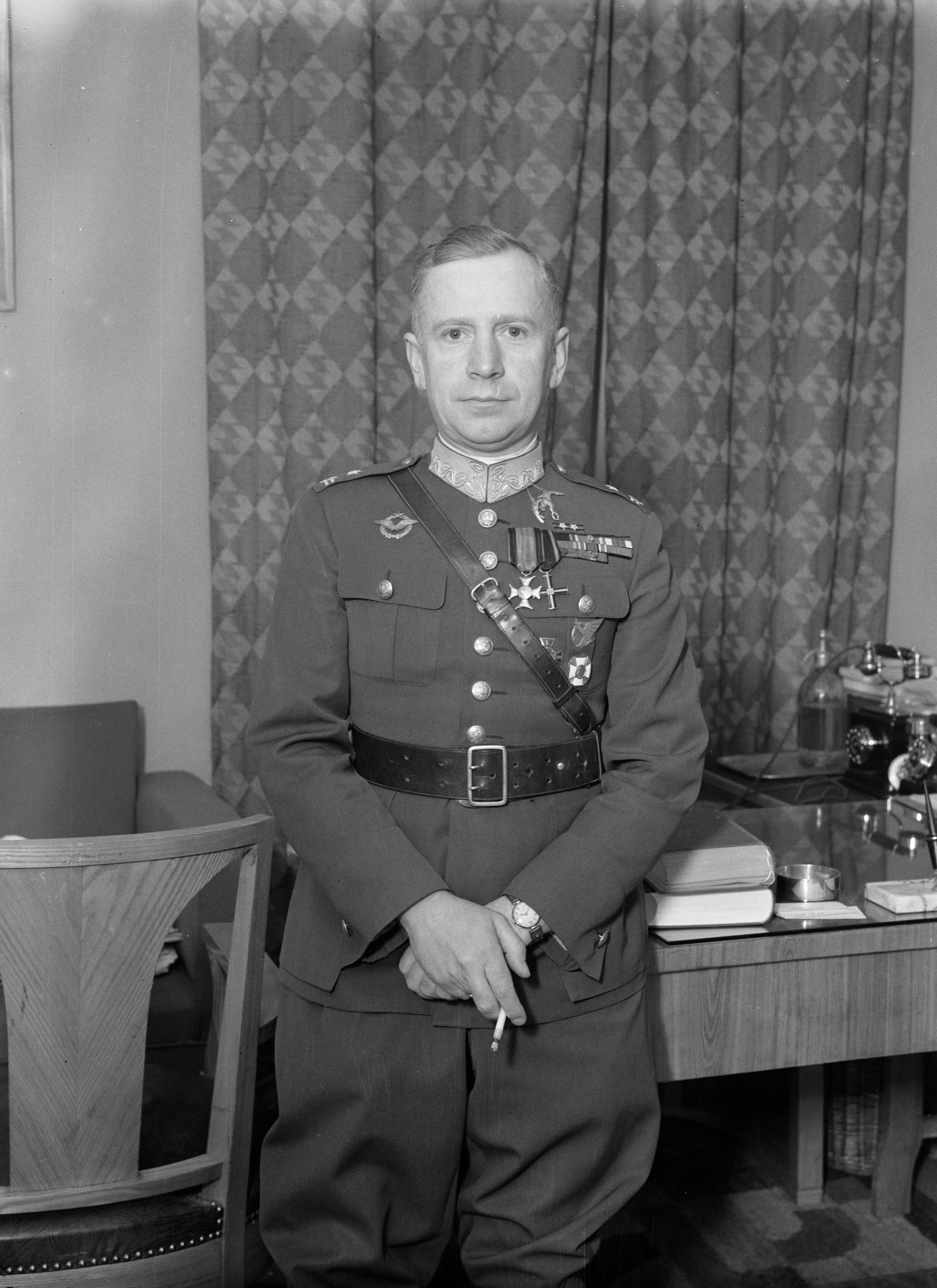
Polish Colonel Stanisław Jakub Skarżyński. He began his military career as an infantryman in the Polish Army. He was wounded in the Polish-Soviet war at the battle of Radzymin.

Colonel Stanisław Skarżyński was a legendary pilot in the Polish Air Force. Initially he began his military service as an infantryman in the Polish army. Early in his military career he fought in the Polish-Soviet war where he was wounded in the battle of Radzymin. He suffered from a badly wounded leg which led to his transfer to an aviation arm. He had numerical heroic feats during his military service. He was awarded the Virtuti Militari 5th class (for the Polish-Soviet war), Cross of Independence, Order of Polonia Restituta 4th class, Krzyż Walecznych (four times), Golden and Silver Cross of Merit, the French Legion d'Honneur and the Brazilian Order of the Southern Cross. The FAI awarded him the Louis Blériot medal (1936) of which he was one of the first recipients.

Stefan Skarżyński was a Major in the Polish army during World War Two.

Stanisław Jakub Skarżyński was a Major and a pilot in the Polish military during World War Two.

Antoni Skarzyński was a Lieutenant in the Polish military.

== French military service ==
Generał Kazimierz Jerzego Skarzynski(1792-1856) the brother of Ambroży Mikołaj Skarżyński. He began his military service in 1806, as a second lieutenant in the French Grande Armée of the First French Empire. As a staff officer of Marshal Jean Lannes, he fought in the War of the Fourth Coalition in Pomerania. In 1807 he joined the Army of the Duchy of Warsaw. Lieutenant in Jan Henryk Dąbrowski's staff. In the Austro-Polish War of 1809 and the French invasion of Russia he was an adjutant to General Aleksander Rożniecki. As a squadron chief of the 6th Uhlan Regiment, he fought at Battle of Leipzig, Battle of Aspern-Essling and in the French campaign of 1814. From 1815 he served in the Army of the Kingdom of Poland, Lieutenant Colonel of exemplary mounted riflemen. From 1818 he was commander of the 2nd Regiment of Mounted Rifles.

After the outbreak of the uprising of 1830 he commanded the 6th Cavalry Brigade. He distinguished himself at Grochów. From March 1831 he was a brigadier general and commander of the reserves of the Cavalry Division. He fought at Ostrołęka, then in the protection of the Narew and Bzura lines. Before the final collapse of the uprising, he resigned and emigrated to Boulogne-sur-Mer, France where he died. He was buried in the Père-Lachaise cemetery. He was awarded the Order of Virtuti Militari, the Legion of Honour, and the Order of Saint Vladimir, 4th class. He was a member of the Freemasons' lodge United Brethren in the first Degree of the Rite.

General Ambroży Mikołaj Skarżyński would become a legendary general under French military and political leader Napoleon Bonaparte and his First French Empire's Grande Armée. He began his career serving in the Prussian army and opposing Napoleonic France in numerous battles. At the beginning of the 19th century, he was the commander of Napoleon's Imperial Guard (Polish 1st Light Cavalry Regiment of the Imperial Guard) and he led the defense of Napoleon himself during the battle of Arcis-sur-Aube. He also took part in the battles of Wagram, Somosierra and Berry-au-Bac. For his bravery at Wagram he was awarded with a title of Chevalier de l'Empire in 1811 and a hereditary rent amounting to 500 francs a year and for his achievements at Berry-au-Bac he received a hereditary title of a Baron of the French Empire in 1814, which was later confirmed by the Polish parliament in 1820. He was awarded the Knight's Cross of the Legion of Honor. Promoted to captain 17 February 1811. In August 1812, during the French Invasion of Russia, he moved to the 3rd Lithuanian Cavalry Regiment, which was being formed at that time, and was promoted to the head of the squadron on 11 August 1812. In the battle of Slonim, the units of this regiment fell into a Russian ambush, from which only Ambroży Skarżyński's squadron survived. After this defeat, the regiment was not reconstituted, and the remnants were incorporated into the regiment of 1st cavalrymen. Participation in the War of the Sixth Coalition (battle of Weimar, battle of Hanau, battle of Dresden, and the battle of Leipzig). On 28 November 1813 he received the Officer's Cross of the Legion of Honour and in 1814 the Order of the Reunion. In the Six Days' Campaign, he took part in the battle of Montmirail, Battle of Château-Thierry, battle of Champaubert, battle of Montereau, battle of Reims, battle of Berry-au-Bac, battle of Arcis-sur-Aube, and battle of Saint-Dizier. At the Battle of Berry-au-Bac (5 March 1814), a squadron commanded by Skarżyński captured the bridge leading to the capture of the Russian troops, which opened the way for the French army. In the Battle of Arcis-sur-Aube, Skarżyński's squadron protected Napoleon from the attack of enemy cavalry. On 31 March 1814, while performing his last mission, at the head of the squadron of the 3rd Eclair Regiment, Capt. Skarżyński arrived, escorted by Emperor Napoleon, to the palace in Fontainebleau, where he signed his abdication.

== German military service ==
In the 1800s Fortunat Skarzynski served in the German Army in Reg Uhlan 4.

Vinzent Skarzynski served in the Imperial German Army's Luftstreitkräfte during World War One.

Ewald Skarzinski served in the Heer during World War Two. He was KIA in the initial stages of the Battle of France.

== Russian nobility ==
When submitting documents (February 1686) for entering the genus into the Velvet Book, the pedigree of the Skarzhinsky family list was provided and the colonel of the Reitar system, Pyotr Grigorievich Skarzhinsky, submitted (April 1686) to the Ambassadorial Order for translation into Russian two "certified sheets" of Polish ambassadors and nobles about the Skarzhinsky gentry. In the same year, Pyotr Skarzhinsky filed a petition in which he asked to send translations from the "sheets" to the Chamber of genealogical affairs and attach them to the genealogy of the Skarzhinsky family, which was done (August 31, 1686).

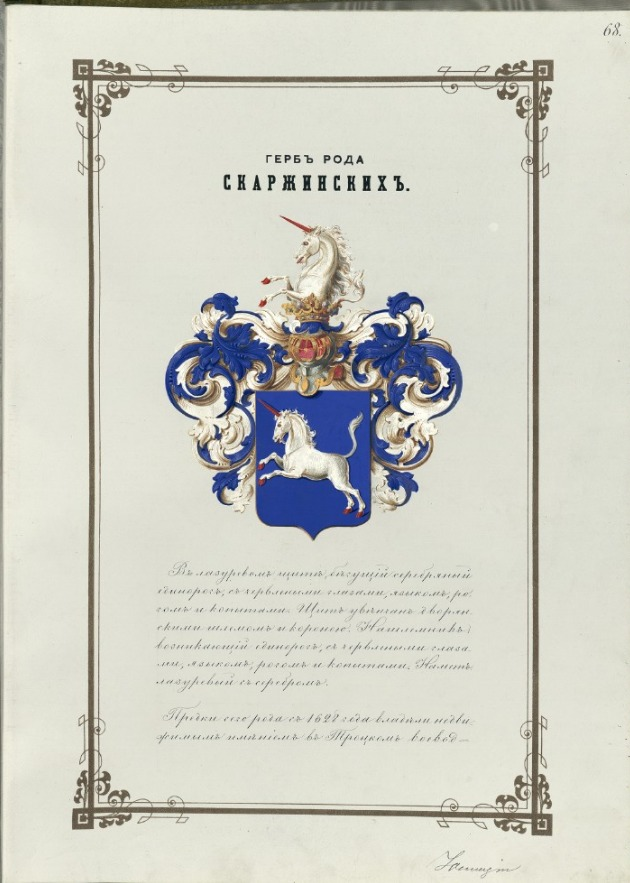
Coat of Arms of the Skarzhinsky Family. Original Image From Part 12 of the General Armorial From the Noble Families of the All Russian Empire.

Viktor Viktorovich Skarzhinsky was a nobleman in St Petersburg, Russia 1869-1920. He owned a mansion on the English Embankment in central St Petersburg.

The ancestors of this family owned an immovable estate in the Trotsky Voivodeship (1628) and were awarded various ranks by Polish kings for their services. Anthony-Alexander Skarzhinsky, who came from this family, entered the Russian service (1733) and, when he converted to the Orthodox faith, was called Mikhail Kazimirovich Skarzhinsky. He settled in the Poltava region. Skarżyński, who settled in the Rav Voivodeship. Of these, Alexander, Lovčij Brzezinski, owned the estates of Studzenice and Laziska (from 1755).

Yuri Skarzhinsky, podstarosta Sochaczewski, was granted (1790) a knight of the Order of St. Stanislaus.

The coat of arms of the Skarzhinsky family is included in Part 12 of the General Armorial of the Noble Families of the All-Russian Empire, page 68.

== Agriculture ==
Viktor Petrovich Skarzhinsky was also a Russian Activist of the village of Kh-va. In his estate "Trikraty", near the city of Voznesensk, Kherson. He organized an advanced farm, in which he improved crop rotations, grass sowing, built more than 40 dams and irrigated meadows. Laid down a pomology. Garden (221 cultivars), dendrological a garden (281 species) with a mulberry plantation (150 hectares) and an orchard with a vineyard (100 hectares). He organized forest nurseries and developed agricultural techniques for growing planting material in relation to steppe conditions. He acclimatized a number of tree and shrub species of the North America and Western America as well as Europe. Skarzhinsky is one of the pioneers of steppe and protective afforestation; By 1853, a forest was planted on an area of 400 hectares.

On 29 October 1990, Aleksandr Alekseyevich Skarzhinskiy was awarded a Silver medal for his work in agriculture with the Research Institute of Vegetable Farming by the government of the Soviet Union.

== Genealogy ==
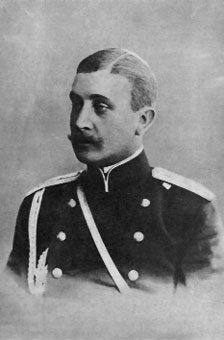
Prince Alexander Vladimirovich Baryatinsky. The Skarzhinsky bloodline is from the same genus as the noble Baryatinsky family.

The Skarzhinskys are ethnically Slavic, Greek, Lithuanian, Italian, Finnish, Tatar, Germanic,, and Karelian. The Skarzhinsky bloodline carries a rare paternal Y DNA subclade of R-FTA11171, R-Z31744, and a few other subbranches of R-YP1337. The Skarzhinsky Y subclade of R-FTA11171 is of a Severian Olgovichi cadet line which is genetically closest to the ancient Rus Kyiv/Chernihiv princes.

== Coat of arms ==
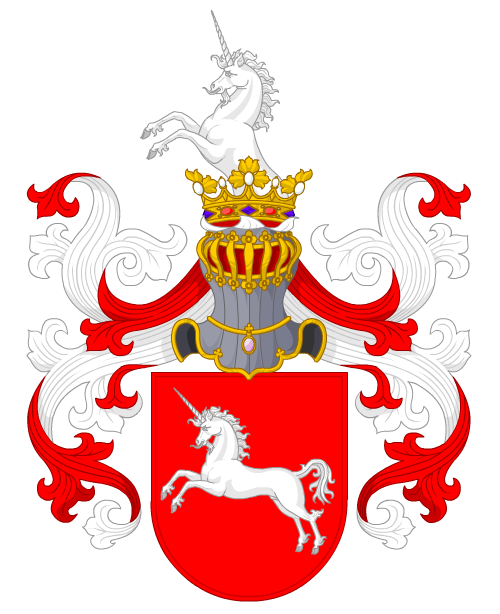
Bończa, Catholic Skarżyński Coat of Arms.

All of the Skarżyński bloodline used variants of the Boncz coat of arms (type 1), and the coats of arms of the two branches of the family, described below, are almost identical.

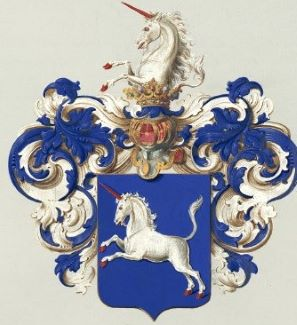
Bończa, Orthodox Skarzhinsky Coat of Arms.

=== Coat of arms 1 (Orthodox Skarzhinsky) ===
In an azure field, a silver unicorn with scarlet eyes, tongue, horn and hooves galloping to the right. The shield is surmounted by a noble crowned helmet. Helmet: An erect unicorn with scarlet eyes, tongue, horn, and hooves. Insignia: azure with silver. The coat of arms of the Skarzhinskys is included in Part 12 of the General Armorial of the Noble Families of the All-Russian Empire, page 68.

=== Coat of arms 1 (Catholic Skarżyński) ===
In the red field, the unicorn is white, to the right. At the top of the helmet there is a white unicorn coming out, to the right." The coat of arms is included in Part 1 of the Armorial of the Noble Families of the Kingdom of Poland, page 86.

== Notable people ==
- Ambroży Mikołaj Skarżyński (1787–1868), Polish born French Napoleonic general of Napoleon's Imperial Guard of the First French Empire.
- Bolesław Skarżyński (1901–1963), Polish biologist
- Henryk Skarżyński (born 1954), Polish otolaryngologist
- Hilary Skarżyński (1925–1987), Polish ice hockey player
- Jerzy Skarżyński (athlete) (born 1956), Polish athlete
- Jerzy Skarżyński (1924–2004), Polish artist and stage designer
- Krystyna Skarżyńska (psychologist), Polish professor, psychologist
- Krystyna Skarżyńska (born 1934), Polish professor, surveying engineer
- Stanisław Skarżyński (1899–1942), Polish military officer and aviator
- Stanisław Jan Skarżyński (1897–1920), Polish pilot
- Teresa Skarżyńska (1884–1957), Polish social activist and resistance fighter

== Bibliography ==
- The Skarzhinsky family in the history of Southern Ukraine (mid-XVIII - early XX century) : [monograph] / O.M. Doroshenko; Odessa. National. un-t them. I. I. Mechnikov, East. f-t, From. history of the Cossacks in the South of Ukraine of the Research Institute of the Cossacks of the Institute of History of Ukraine of the National Academy of Sciences of Ukraine. - Mykolaiv : Publishing house of Irina Gudym, 2011. - 164 p. : ill. - Bibliogr.: pp. 132–164. - ISBN 978-617-576-048-2
- Kosiński A., Heraldic Guide, Kraków: Wł. L. Anczyc et al., 1877, p. 722.
