= Krystyna Skarżyńska =

Krystyna Skarżyńska may refer to:

- Krystyna Skarżyńska (psychologist), Polish psychologist and professor
- Krystyna Skarżyńska (geotechnical engineer), Polish geotechnical engineer and surveying engineer

== See also ==
- Skarżyński
