= Mglinsky =

Mglinsky (masculine), Mglinskaya (feminine), or Mglinskoye (neuter) may refer to:

- Mglinsky District, a district of Bryansk Oblast, Russia
- Mglinsky Uyezd (1919–1920), an administrative division of Gomel Governorate in the early Russian SFSR
- Mglinsky Urban Administrative Okrug, an administrative division which the town of Mglin in Mglinsky District of Bryansk Oblast, Russia is incorporated as
- Mglinskoye Urban Settlement, a municipal formation which Mglinsky Urban Administrative Okrug in Mglinsky District of Bryansk Oblast, Russia is incorporated as
