= Lugovka =

Lugovka (Russian: Луговка) is the name of several rural localities in Russia:

- Lugovka, Belgorod Oblast, a selo in Grayvoronsky District of Belgorod Oblast
- Lugovka, Bryansk Oblast, a village in Molodkovsky Rural Administrative Okrug of Mglinsky District of Bryansk Oblast; 53°13′N 32°45′E
- Lugovka, Manturovsky District, Kursk Oblast, a khutor in Repetsky Selsoviet of Manturovsky District of Kursk Oblast
- Lugovka, Rylsky District, Kursk Oblast, a village in Nekrasovsky Selsoviet of Rylsky District of Kursk Oblast
- Lugovka, Nizhny Novgorod Oblast, a village in Uviysky Selsoviet of Tonshayevsky District of Nizhny Novgorod Oblast
- Lugovka, Pskov Oblast, a village in Pushkinogorsky District of Pskov Oblast
- Lugovka, Chernsky District, Tula Oblast, a village in Novopokrovskaya Rural Administration of Chernsky District of Tula Oblast
- Lugovka, Kamensky District, Tula Oblast, a village in Kadnovsky Rural Okrug of Kamensky District of Tula Oblast
- Lugovka, Volovsky District, Tula Oblast, a village in Baskakovsky Rural Okrug of Volovsky District of Tula Oblast
- Lugovka, Yefremovsky District, Tula Oblast, a village in Lobanovsky Rural Okrug of Yefremovsky District of Tula Oblast

Alternative names

- Lugovka, alternative name of Lugovets, a selo in Krasnokosarovsky Rural Administrative Okrug of Mglinsky District in Bryansk Oblast
