= Włocławek Aero Club =

The Aeroklub Włocławski (Włocławek Aero Club), founded in 1959, is a regional branch of The Polish Aero Club. Located at the Włocławek-Kruszyn airport in Kruszyn near Włocławek.

== History ==
The beginning of aviation in Włocławek dates back to 1935–39, when three gliders were built based on the plans of the Orlik glider. The gliders were created by students of Gimnazjum Ziemi Kujawskiej (Middle School of the Kuyavian Land). They were motivated by the achievements of Stanisałw Skarżynski who also graduated that school.

After World War II, activists and pilots began to organize construction of an airport near Włocławek. In 1947 the Aviation League was established with the help of the Pomeranian Aero Club, which sent two Po-2 aircraft with pilots to Włocławek. The planes landed on Kapitułka airstrip on Jasna Street.

In connection with a ten-year period of developing interest in aviation in the city and region, the Board of the Aero Club Branch was elected during a special meeting in 1957. In the same year, at a city and district (powiat) activist meeting, Civil Committee for Construction of a Hangar and an Airport was established. The committee received 82 hectares (202 acres) of land in Krzywa Góra near Włocławek, from the Presidium of the National Council of the district. In 1959 the Board of the Polish Aero Club agreed to establish the Włocławek branch of the club. Due to the construction of the Nitrogen Plant “Włocławek” in Krzywa Góra, a new location, near Kruszyn, was selected for the development of the airport. Construction began in 1961 and the opening took place in 1965. The airport occupied 78 hectares of land on which a harbour building, a hangar, a petrol station and garages were built along with access roads.

In 1965, the Włocławek Aero Club organized the 3rd Polish Aircraft Acrobatic Championship. This event has initiated cultural and aviation traditions associated with the Aeroclub and the city of Włocławek. Various types of events and celebrations are held at the airport, mainly related to aviation competitions. In June 1991 pope John Paul II celebrated a mass at the airport.

Due to the economic changes in the early nineties, the Polish Aero Club stopped subsidizing its regional branches. Because of that, local aero clubs found themselves in a difficult position, where they had to look for their own funds. For this reason, the traditions of carnivals as well as air and model-making shows are maintained, which are instrumental in popularising these disciplines and sports.
