= Stanisław Skarżyński =

Royal Air Force officer

Stanisław Jakub Skarżyński
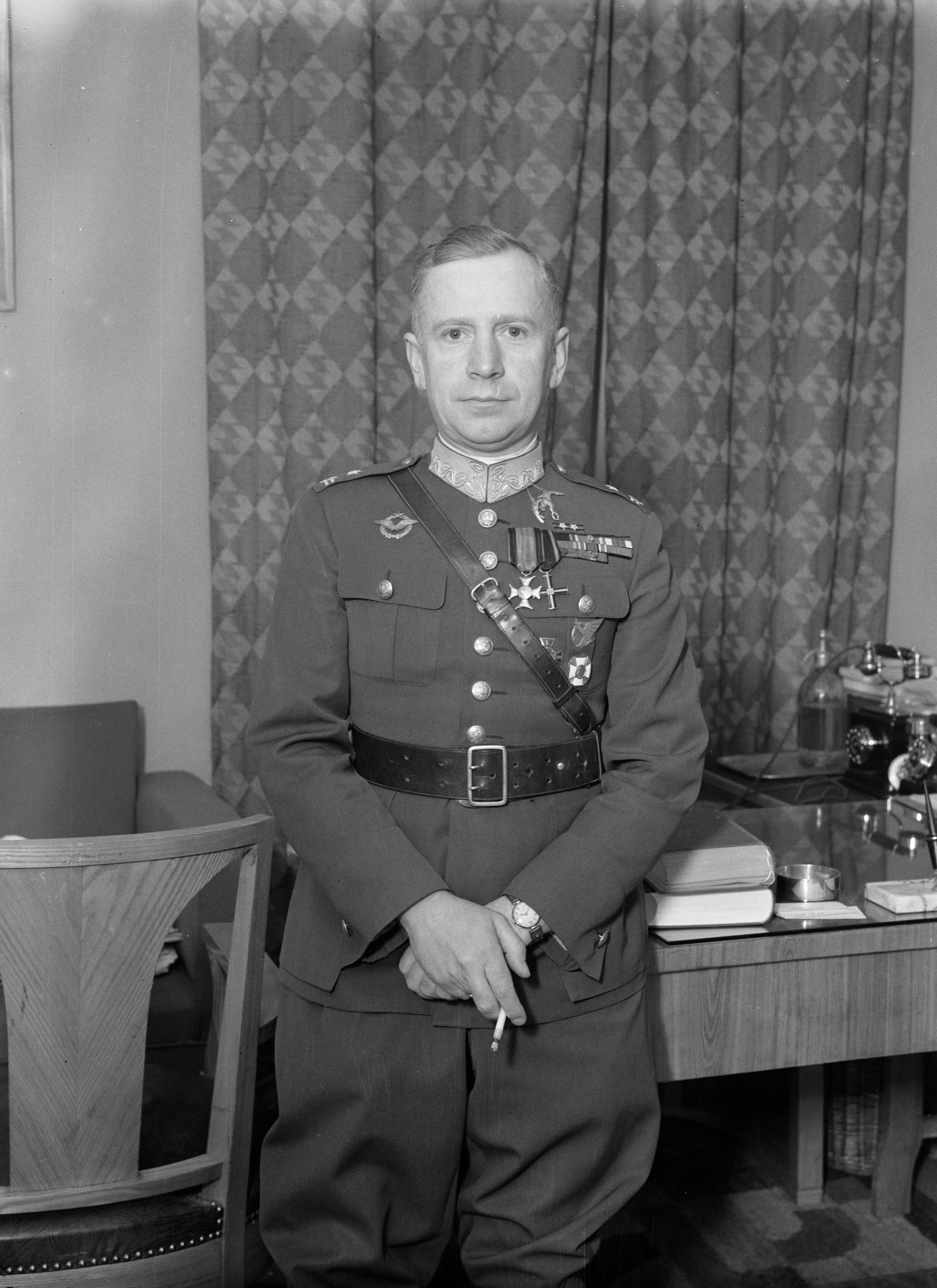
- Stanisław Jakub Skarżyński in 1934
- Born: 1 May 1899; Warta
- Died: 26 June 1942 (aged 43); North Sea
- Burial place: Terschelling
- Military career
- Allegiance: Poland
- Branch: Polish Army; Polish Air Force
- Service years: 1918–1942
- Rank: Colonel (posthumously)
- Conflicts: Polish–Soviet War; World War II
- Awards

Stanisław Jakub Skarżyński (1 May 1899 − 26 June 1942) was a lieutenant colonel in the Polish Air Force and aviator famous for his transatlantic solo flight in 1933.

== Early military career ==
In 1916–17 Skarżyński was a member of the Polish Military Organisation (POW). In November 1918 he volunteered for the newly created Polish Army, and commanded units disarming German soldiers in Warta. He then fought in the Polish-Soviet War with the infantry, being promoted to second lieutenant in 1919. He was wounded but returned to the front. During the battle of Radzymin he was severely wounded in one leg on 16 August 1920. The infected wound needed long rehabilitation, and Skarżyński always limped thereafter. Unable to continue serving in the infantry, he managed to transfer to the military aviation arm.

He completed pilot training in Bydgoszcz in 1925, and served in the 1st Aviation Regiment in Warsaw. In 1927 he became a Flying Captain (kapitan pilot). Between 1 and 5 February May 1931 together with Lt. Andrzej Markiewicz, he flew around Africa in the Polish-designed aircraft PZL Ł-2 (registration SP-AFA), a total distance of 25,770 km.

== Transatlantic flight ==
On 7/8 May 1933 Skarzynski flew solo in a small single-seater Polish tourist airplane RWD-5bis (SP-AJU) across the southern Atlantic, from Saint-Louis, Senegal to Maceio in Brazil. The flight took 20 hours 30 minutes (17 hours 15 minutes above the ocean). He crossed 3,582 km, establishing a distance World Record in a FAI tourist plane category II (weight below 450 kg / 1000 lb). The plane had no radio nor safety equipment, due to weight restrictions. The RWD-5bis remains the smallest plane to ever to have flown across the Atlantic. Plans of his flight were kept secret. It became a part of Warsaw – Rio de Janeiro flight, between 27 April and 10 May 17,885 km long. He then flew on to Buenos Aires and returned to Europe by ship.

== Later service and World War II ==
In 1934, he was promoted to major and commanded a bomber squadron. From 1938, he was deputy C.O. of the 4th Aviation Regiment in Toruń, with a rank of lieutenant colonel (podpułkownik pilot). In April 1939, he became President of the Polish Aero Club. In August 1939 he was sent to Romania as the deputy air attaché.

After the outbreak of World War II, he helped in transporting Polish pilots, fleeing from Poland, through Romania to France, where the Polish Air Force was recreated. In 1940 Skarżyński, after the fall of France, helped ship 17,000 Polish airmen to Britain, where he became commanding officer of Polish Flying Schools at RAF Hucknall and then RAF Newton.

In spite of his advanced age for a military pilot, and mobility impairment, he requested a combat posting, and was assigned as C.O. of RAF Lindholme and No. 305 Polish Bomber Squadron. He undertook five successful night missions over France and Germany as the second pilot. On 25/26 June 1942, while flying on a mission over Bremen (one of the thousand-aircraft raids), an engine stalled in his Wellington Mk II, code letters SM-R, above the North Sea. Skarżyński did not make it home and ditched the aircraft in the stormy sea, after 2 am, around 65 km from English coast. Skarżyński, leaving the Wellington from a separate emergency hatch, was probably washed out to sea from the fuselage top, and was the only crew member lost. His body was found on the Dutch shore and he was later buried with full military honours on the Dutch island of Terschelling.

== Honours ==
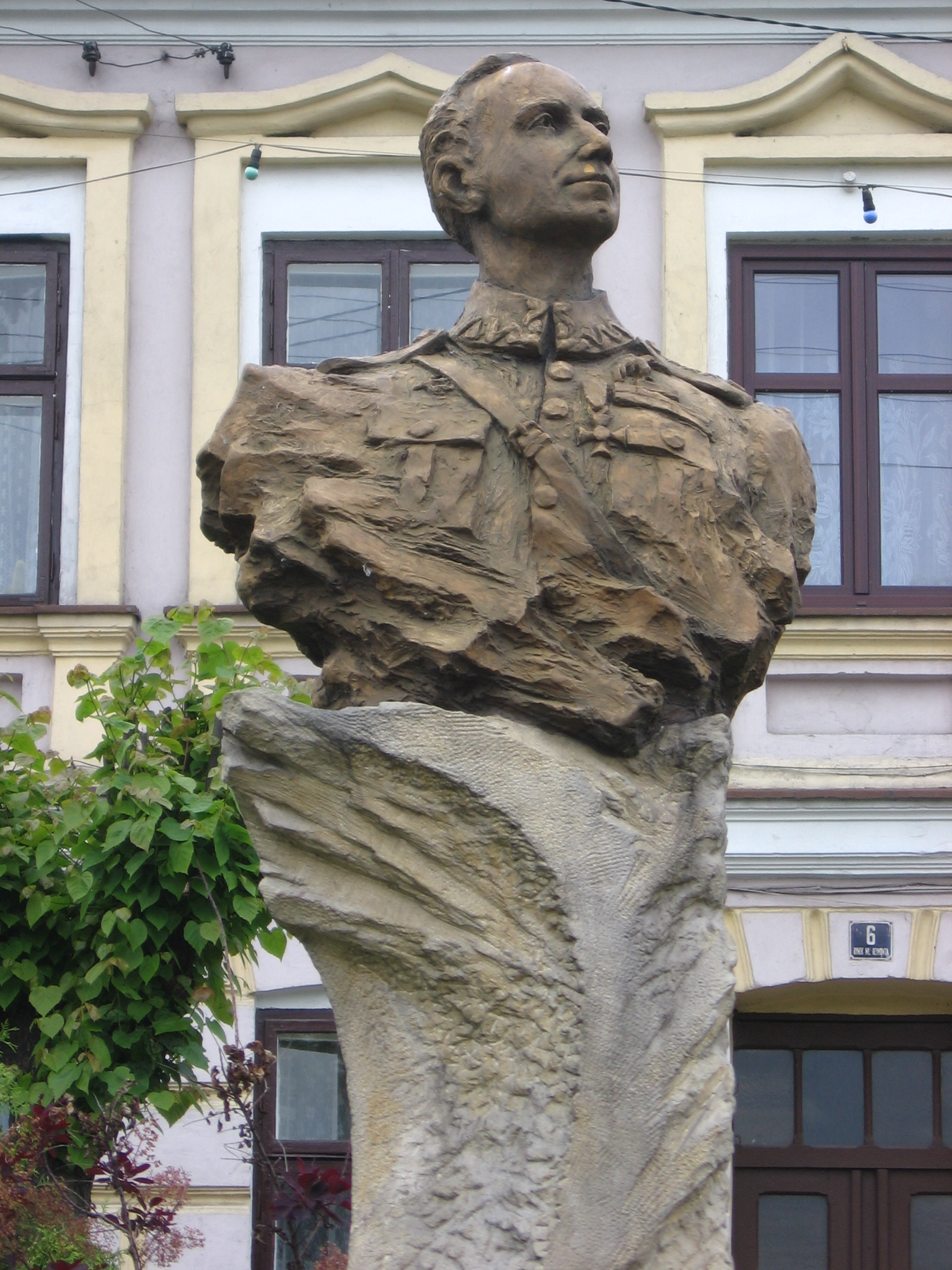
Statue of Stanisław Skarżyński in his hometown, Warta

He was awarded the Virtuti Militari 5th class (for the Polish-Soviet war), Cross of Independence, Order of Polonia Restituta 4th class, Krzyż Walecznych (four times), Golden and Silver Cross of Merit, the French Legion d'Honneur and the Brazilian Order of the Southern Cross. The FAI awarded him the Louis Blériot medal (1936) of which he was one of the first recipients.

Posthumously he was made a full colonel (pułkownik pilot) and awarded the Order of Polonia Restituta 2nd class by the President of Poland. There are numerous streets and schools named after him. He is the Patron of the Aeroclub of Włocławek and of the 13th Transport Squadron in Kraków. On 10 August 2009 the Minister of National Defense signed the Decree to appoint him as Patron of 8 Air Base in Kraków – Balice, which now is named after him.

== Awards and decorations ==
- Silver Cross of Virtuti Militari (1922)
- Commander's Cross with Star of the Order of Polonia Restituta (posthumously, 19 September 1997)
- Cross of Independence
- Officer's Cross of the Order of Polonia Restituta (2 June 1933)
- Cross of Valour (three times)
- Gold Cross of Merit
- Commemorative Medal for the War of 1918–1921
- Medal of the Tenth Anniversary of Regained Independence
- Honorary Badge of Airborne and Antigas Defence League
- Wound Decoration (twice)
- Commander's Cross of the Hungarian Order of Merit (Hungary)
- Officer of the Order of the Crown of Romania
- Officer of the Order of the Southern Cross
- Chevalier of the Legion of Honour

== Sources ==
- Frankowski, Piotr R. (February 2022). "Polish Wings Across the Pond". Aeroplane. Vol. 50, no. #2. pp. 88–95. ISSN 0143-7240.
- (in Polish) Konieczny, Jerzy and Malinowski, Tadeusz: Mała encyklopedia lotników polskich, Warsaw, 1983, pp. 155–164, ISBN 83-206-0337-4, Skarzynski, Maciej
- Krajewski, Wojciech (January–February 2024). "Ostatni lot pułkownika Stanisława Skarżyńskiego". Technika Wojskowa Historia (in Polish). Vol. 1/2024(85). Warsaw: Magnum X. pp. 28–33.
