= Stanisław Jan Skarżyński =

Polish pilot (1897–1920)

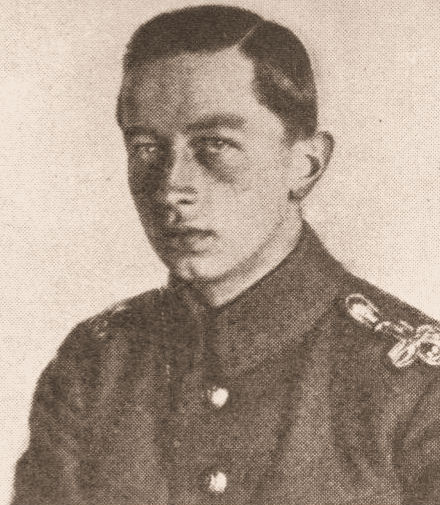
Stanisław Jan Skarżyński in 1918

Stanisław Jan Skarżyński (23 April 1897 in Aleksandrów – 15 July 1920 near Zwierowce) was a Polish pilot who fought and died in the Polish-Soviet War. For his actions he received the highest military order of Poland, Virtuti Militari, posthumously.
