= Polish Aero Club =

Polish association for air sports or recreational flying

The Polish Aero Club (Aeroklub Polski, AP) is the Polish central association of persons practising air sports or recreational flying. It was founded in 1921 and is a member of the Fédération Aéronautique Internationale. It has a headquarters in Warsaw.

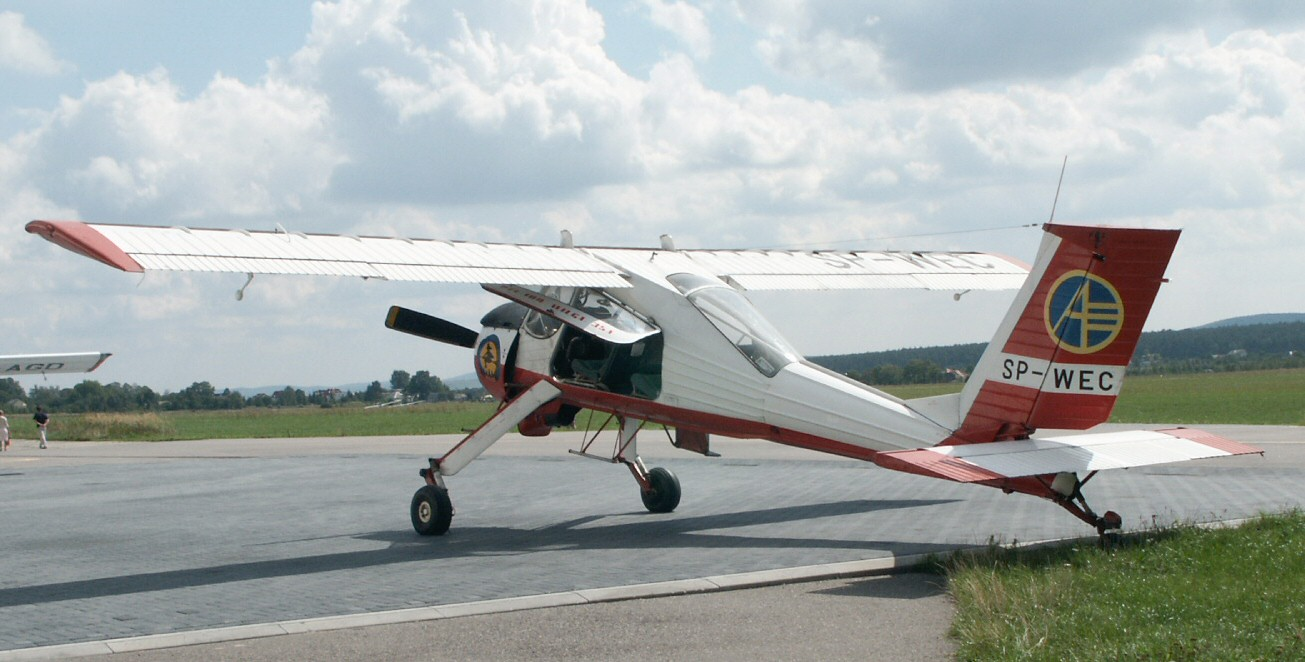
The most typical aircraft of the Polish Aero Club - a multipurpose PZL-104 Wilga of the regional Aeroklub Kielecki. The AP logo is well visible on a rudder

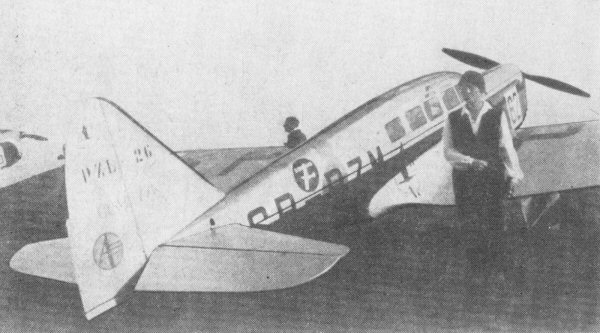
A sportsplane PZL.26, during the Challenge 1934 contest, of the Aero Club of the Polish Republic (ARP)

== History ==
Aviation organizations could be founded in Poland only after regaining independence in 1918. The first such organization was Aeroklub Polski w Poznaniu (PAC in Poznań), founded on 30 October 1919 and admitted to the FAI in 1920. In June 1920 there was founded Aeroklub Polski w Warszawie (PAC in Warsaw). On 18 January 1921 both Aero Clubs formed a central federation Aeroklub Rzeczypospolitej Polskiej (ARP; Aero Club of the Polish Republic). By 1939, there were created several other regional aero clubs, including some university aero clubs.

Before the World War II, members of the ARP took active part in world's aviation sports. The first major international event was the Challenge 1930 touring planes contest. The Poles enjoyed success in the Challenge 1932 and several Gordon Bennett Cup in ballooning contests. The ARP organized the Challenge 1934 international contest and the Gordon Bennett Cup in ballooning in 1934–1936, also successful for the Polish pilots.

Just after the World War II, in 1945 the association was renewed and more regional aero clubs were created. In 1957–1990 it was named Aeroklub Polskiej Rzeczpospolitej Ludowej (APRL; Aero Club of the Polish People's Republic). At the time of communist Poland, the membership in aero club was practically the only chance for private persons to fly. The ARP/APRL was supported by the government and supplied with trainer and auxiliary aircraft withdrawn from the Polish Air Force, distributed to regional aero clubs.

== Present ==
In 1990, after a fall of communism, the organization was renamed to its current name Aeroklub Polski, referring to the first historical organization of that type.

Aeroklub Polski is the national governing and coordinating body of air sport and recreational flying. Organizational units of the Aeroklub Polski are regional aero clubs; members of regional aero clubs are also members of AP. Currently there are 58 regional aero clubs in Poland (as of 2007).

Goals of AP are, among others: a propagation and development of the aviation in Poland, an organization of air sports and air recreation, a representation of Polish air sports abroad, a training of aviators. It is also a sports association.

== See also ==
- Włocławek Aero Club (1959), regional branch of The Polish Aero Club
