= Samokhvalovka =

Samokhvalovka Самохваловка
- Village
- Location within Bashkortostan Location within Russia
- Coordinates: 54°40′N 56°09′E
- Country: Russia
- Region: Bashkortostan
- District: Ufa
- Time zone: UTC+5:00

Samokhvalovka (Russian: Самохваловка) is a rural locality (a village) in Ufa, Bashkortostan, Russia. The population was 39 as of 2010. There are 4 streets.

== Geography ==
Samokhvalovka is located 19 km southeast of Ufa. Fyodorovka is the nearest rural locality.
