= Krystyna Skarżyńska (psychologist) =

Polish psychologist

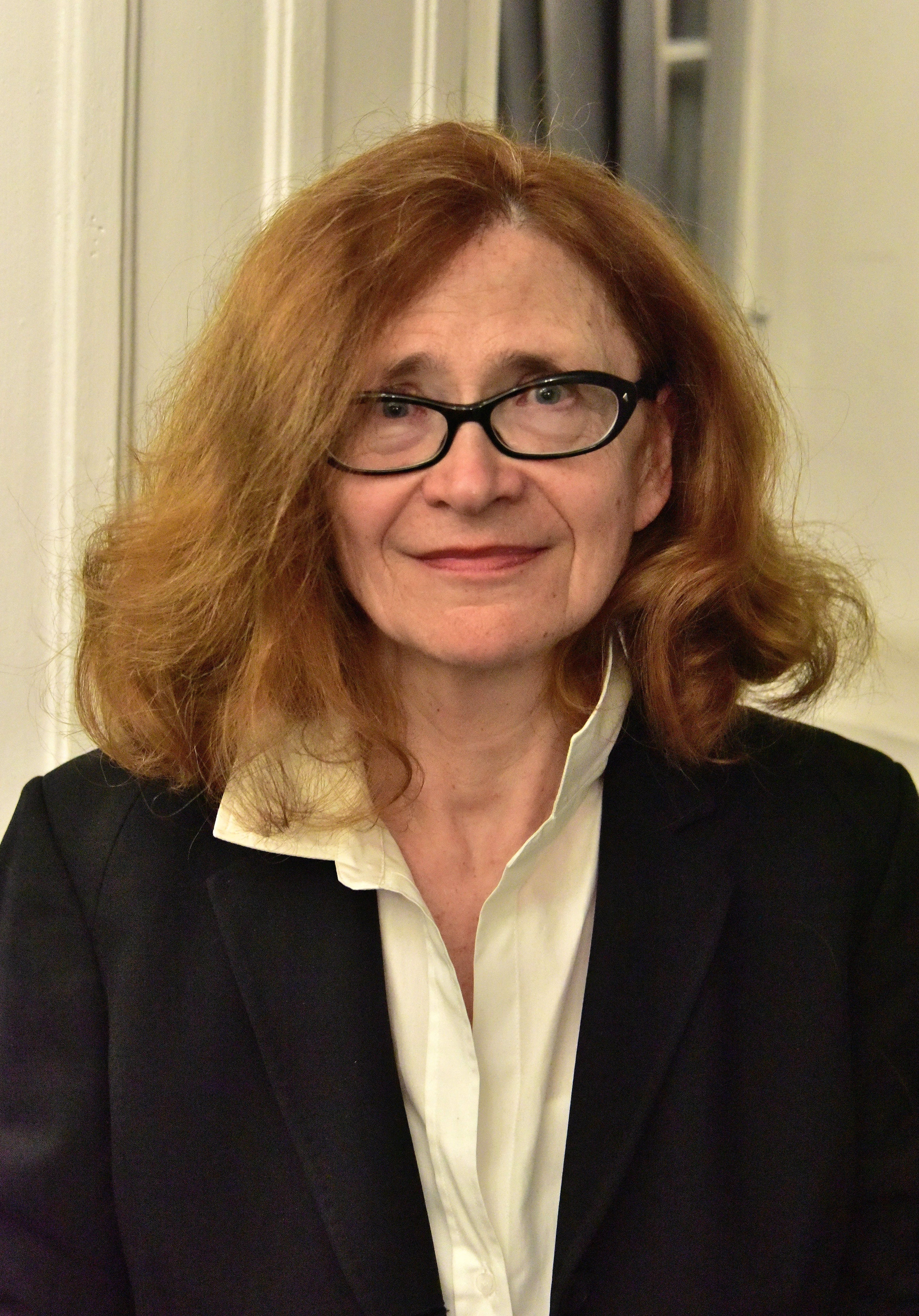

Krystyna Skarżyńska is Polish psychologist, professor of humanities, holding the positions of full professor at the SWPS University of Social Sciences and Humanities and the Institute of Psychology of the Polish Academy of Sciences, expert in political psychology and social psychology.

She graduated from the Faculty of Journalism and Political Sciences, University of Warsaw. In 1993 she received the scientific title of professor in humanities.

== Books ==
- Człowiek a polityka. Zarys psychologii politycznej (2005)
- Konformizm i samokierowanie jako wartości (struktura i źródła) (1991)
- Psychospołeczne aspekty decyzji alokacyjnych (1985)
- Spostrzeganie ludzi (1981)
- Studia nad spostrzeganiem osób. Regulacyjna funkcja informacji centralnych (1979)
