= Mglin =

Town in Bryansk Oblast, Russia

Mglin Мглин
- Town
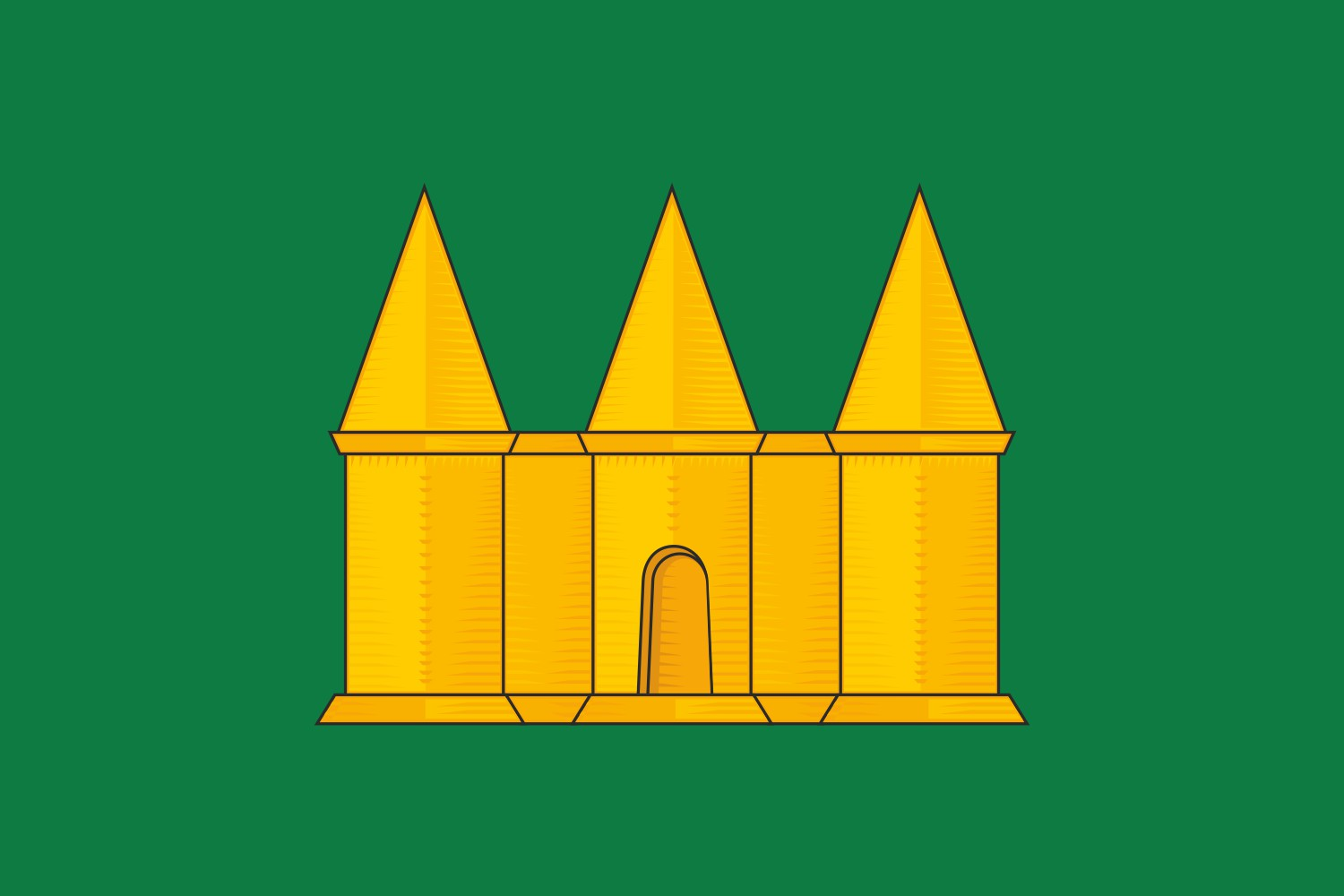
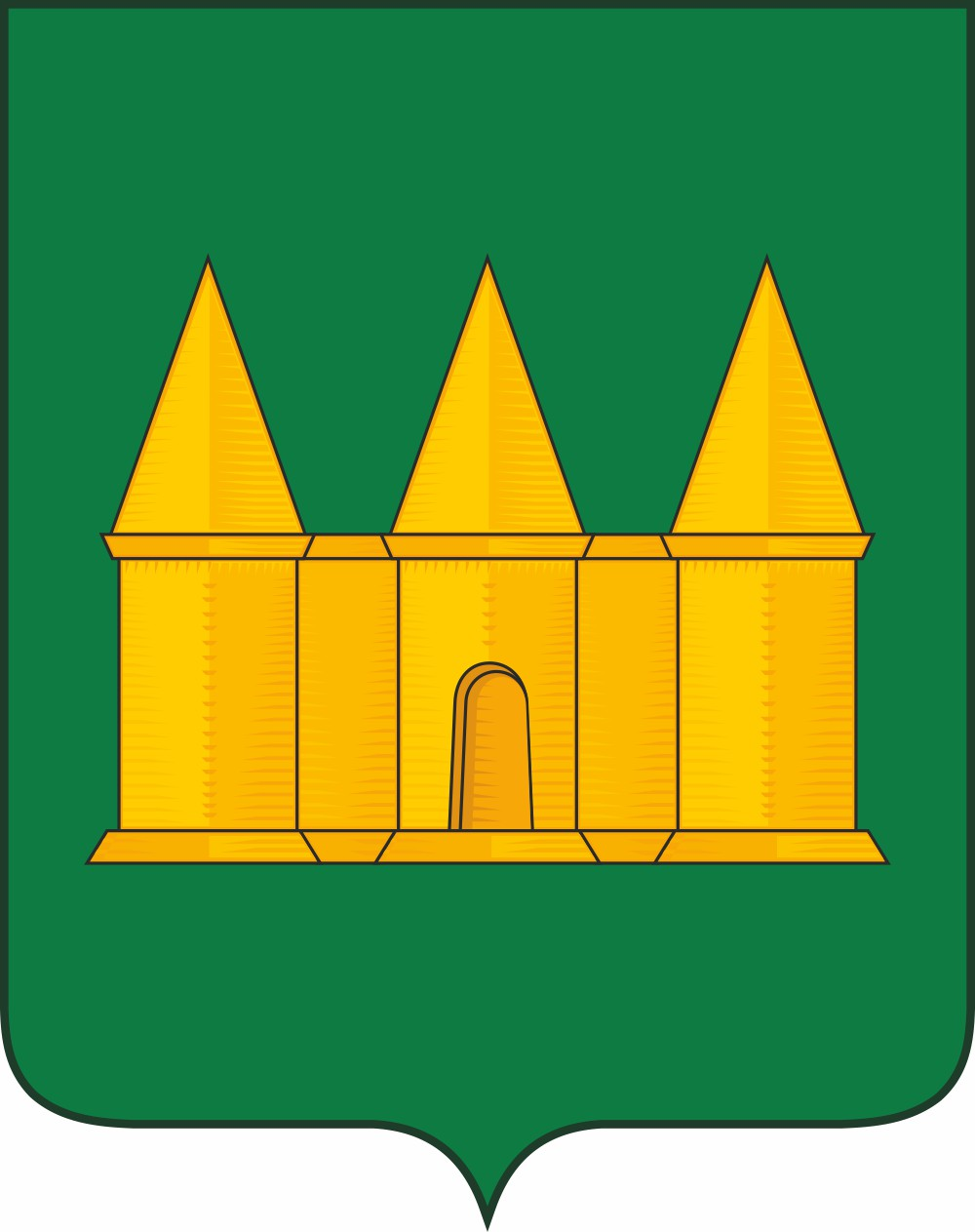
- Flag Coat of arms
- Interactive map of Mglin
- Location of Mglin Mglin (Bryansk Oblast)
- Coordinates: 53°03′N 32°51′E
- Country: Russia
- Federal subject: Bryansk Oblast
- Administrative district: Mglinsky District
- Urban Administrative OkrugSelsoviet: Mglinsky
- First mentioned: 1389
- Town status since: 1781
- Elevation: 180 m (590 ft)

Population (2010 Census)
  - Total: 7,916
  - Estimate (2021): 6,919 (−12.6%)

Administrative status
  - Capital of: Mglinsky District, Mglinsky Urban Administrative Okrug

Municipal status
  - Municipal district: Mglinsky Municipal District
  - Urban settlement: Mglinskoye Urban Settlement
  - Capital of: Mglinsky Municipal District, Mglinskoye Urban Settlement
- Time zone: UTC+3 (MSK)
- Postal code: 243220
- Dialing code: +7 48339
- OKTMO ID: 15636101001

Mglin (Russian: Мглин, Polish: Mglin) is a town and the administrative center of Mglinsky District in Bryansk Oblast, Russia, located on the Sudynka River 167 kilometers (104 mi) west of Bryansk, the administrative center of the oblast. Population: 6,919 (2021 census); 7,916 (2010 census); 8,261 (2002 census); 7,704 (1989 Soviet census).

== History ==
Historical affiliations

Grand Duchy of Lithuania ca. 1389–1502
Grand Duchy of Moscow 1502–1547
Tsardom of Russia 1547–1607
Polish–Lithuanian Commonwealth 1607–1648
Cossack Hetmanate 1648–1781 (Note: Under protectorate of Tsardom of Russia in 1654–1721 and Russian Empire after 1721)
Russian Empire 1781–1917
Russian Republic 1917
Soviet Russia 1917–1922
Soviet Union 1922–1991
Russian Federation 1991–present

Mglin was first mentioned in 1389, though the settlement it was built on had existed since the 12th century.

During the Khmelnytsky Uprising, Mglin came under the control of Cossack forces and became a sotnia (company town) center within the Nizhyn Regiment, and from 1663, within the Starodub Regiment of the Cossack Hetmanate. In 1658, a Cossack detachment under the command of Ivan Nechay defeated the Russians near Mglin.

In 1760, Empress Elizabeth granted Mglin as a private estate to Kyrylo Rozumovsky, the last Hetman of Cossack Ukraine. Following the abolition of the Hetmanate’s autonomy in 1781, Mglin became the administrative center of a uyezd (district) within the Novgorod-Seversky Viceroyalty, and in 1802 it was incorporated into the Chernigov Governorate.

During World War II, Mglin was occupied by the German Army from 16 August 1941 to 22 September 1943. Prior to the war, 726 Jews lived in the town. The majority of Jews were merchants and artisans. There was also a Jewish kolkhoz. There was a synagogue in the town, but it was closed before the war. Some of the Jews managed to evacuate before the Germans arrived. Shortly after the occupation, all of the Jews were registered and marked. In January 1942, they were confined to a prison, where they stayed till the execution on March 2, 1942. While in prison, the Jews were used for forced labor. Before being executed, the Jews had to undress to underwear in the little house, which used to be a morgue, situated about 500m from the mass grave. The shooting was carried out by a special German punitive unit in black uniforms and around 500 people were killed.

== Administrative and municipal status ==
Within the framework of administrative divisions, Mglin serves as the administrative center of Mglinsky District. As an administrative division, it is incorporated within Mglinsky District as Mglinsky Urban Administrative Okrug. As a municipal division, Mglinsky Urban Administrative Okrug is incorporated within Mglinsky Municipal District as Mglinskoye Urban Settlement.

== Religion ==
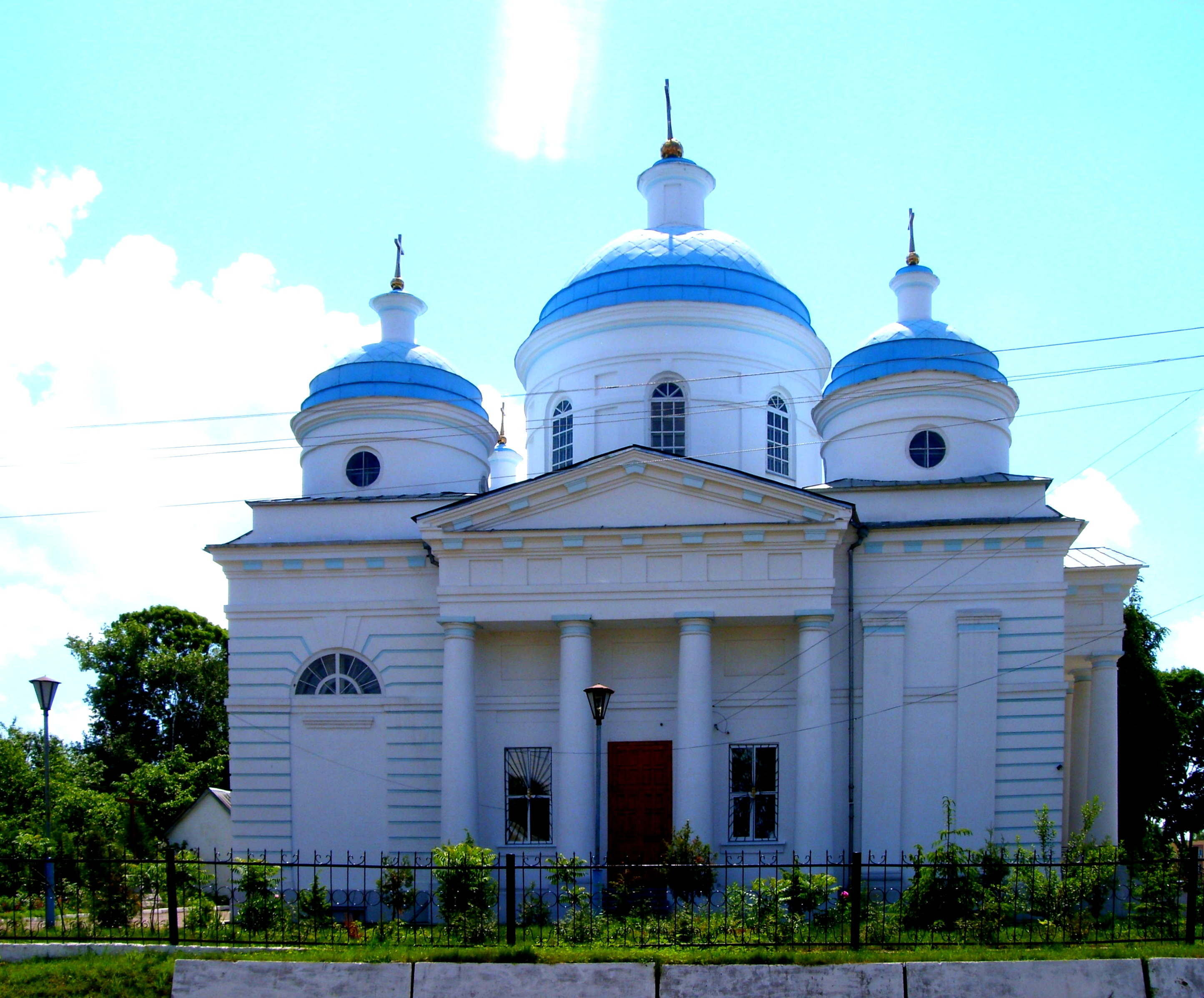
The Dormition Cathedral in Mglin

The Dormition Cathedral, built in 1815–1830 in the Neoclassical style, functions in the town.
