= Krystyna Skarżyńska (geotechnical engineer) =

Krystyna M. Skarżyńska (Krystyna Maria Skarżyńska) (born 2 May 1934) is a Polish geotechnical engineer, surveying engineer (Polish: geodesysta, literally "geodesist"), hydrologist, and educator.

Born in Żnin, she earned master's degree in water construction engineering from the Tadeusz Kościuszko University of Technology (1956) and doctoral degree in technical sciences (1964) and the dr. hab. degree in technical sciences (1970) both from the Warsaw University of Technology .

From 1960 to 2004 she was with the Department of Soil Mechanics and Terrestrial Construction (Katedrą Mechaniki Gruntów i Budownictwa Ziemnego) of the Agricultural University of Kraków.

== Awards ==
Krystyna Skarżyńska is a recipient of several state awards and decorations, including:

- Knight's Cross of the Order of Polonia Restituta
- Gold Cross of Merit
- Medal of the Commission of National Education
