= Mglinsky District =

Mglinsky District Мглинский район (Russian)
- District
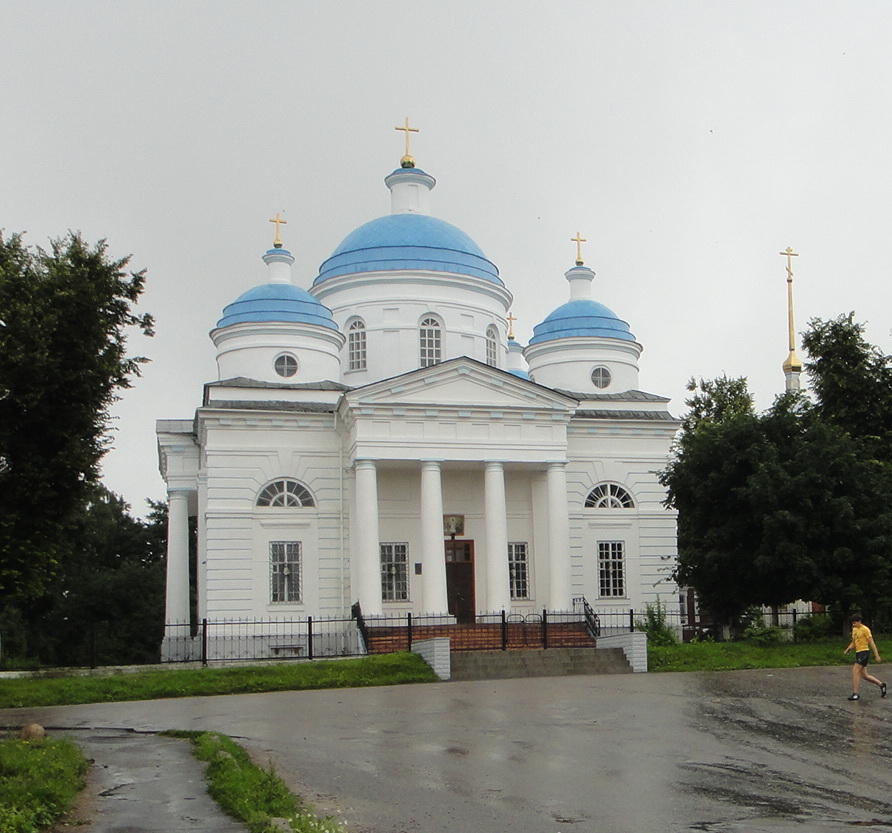
- Cathedral of the Assumption, Mglin

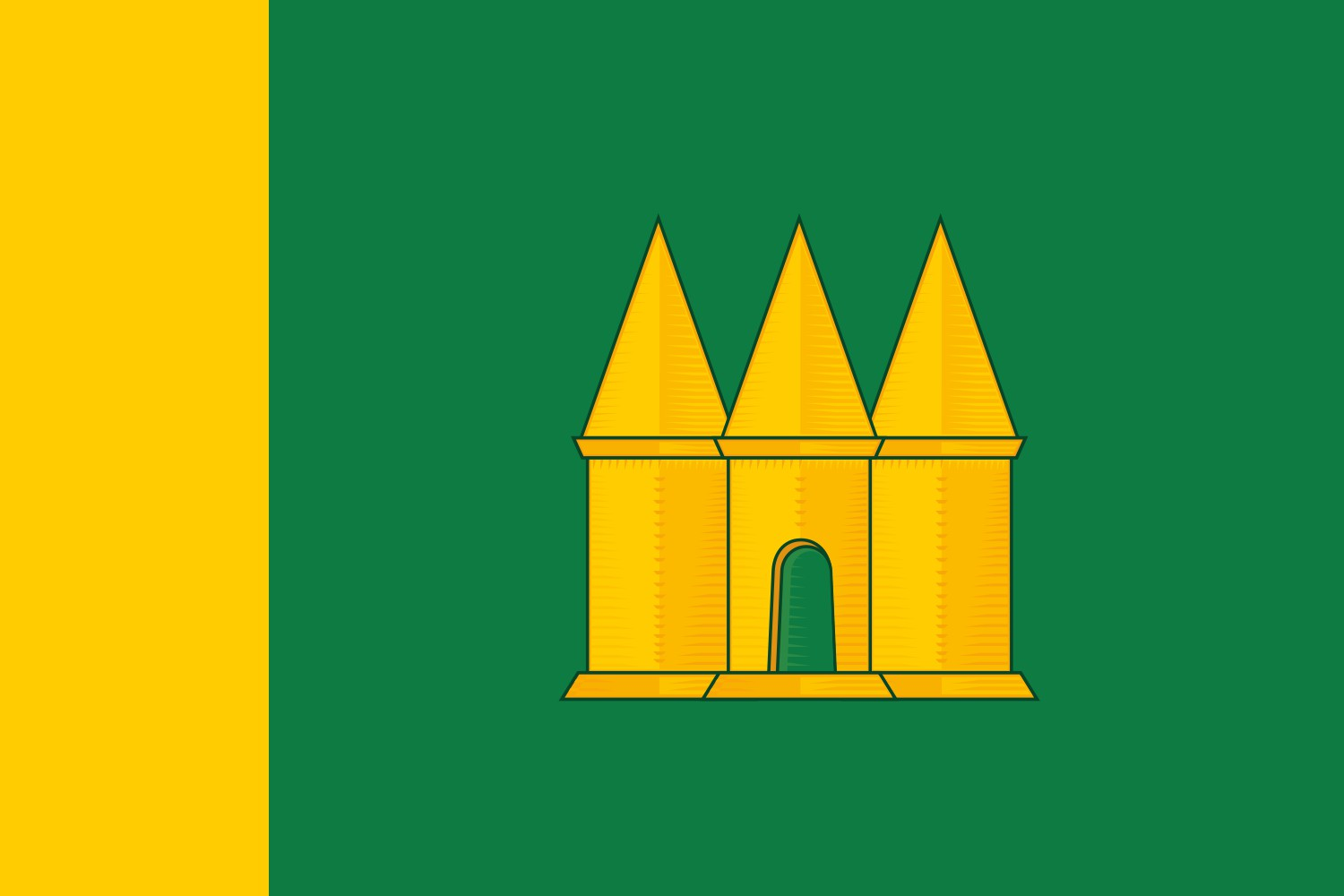
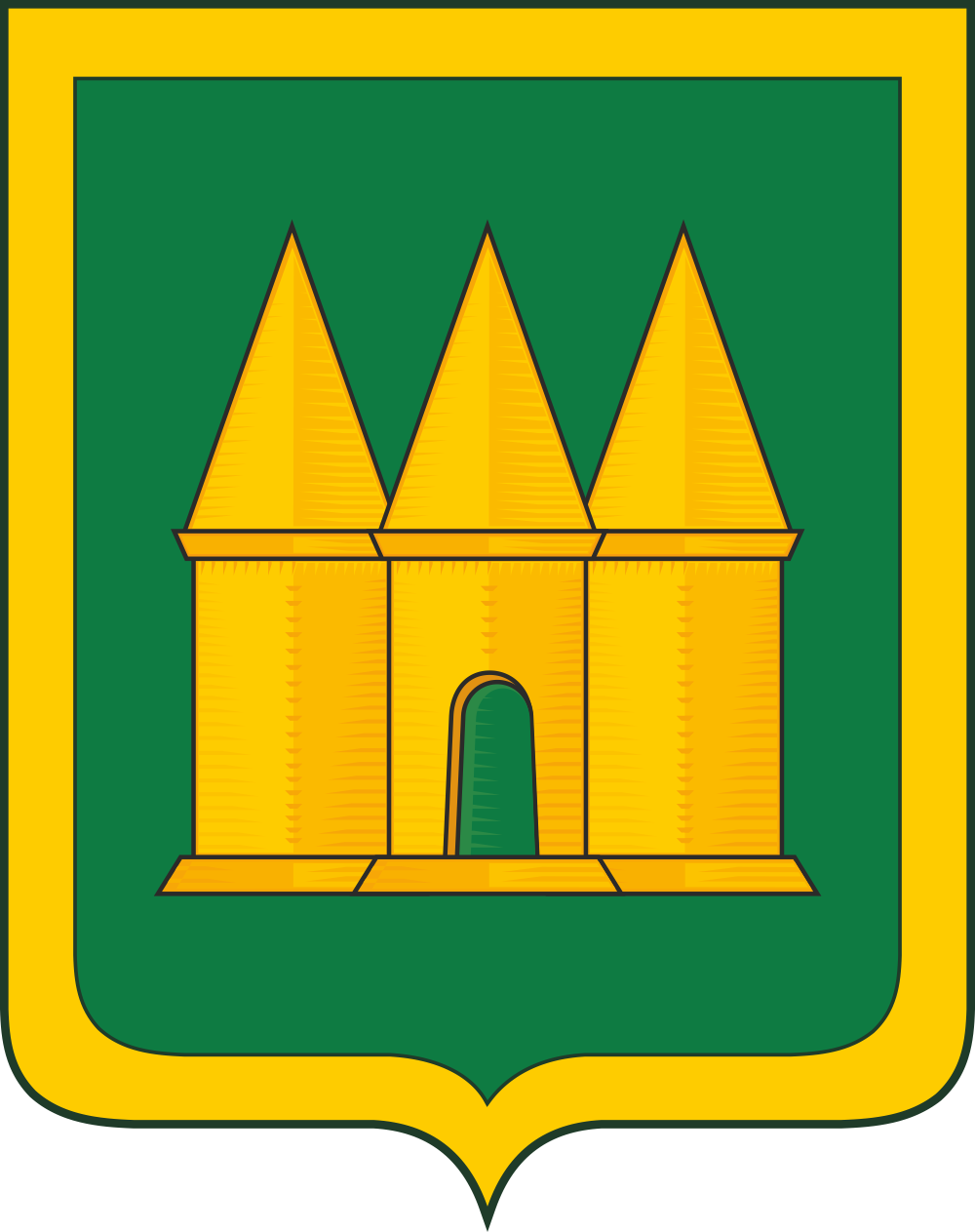
- Flag Coat of arms
- Location of Mglinsky District in Bryansk Oblast
- Coordinates: 53°03′N 32°51′E
- Country: Russia
- Federal subject: Bryansk Oblast
- Established: 1929
- Administrative center: Mglin

Area
  - Total: 1,088 km^{2} (420 sq mi)

Population (2010 Census)
  - Total: 19,458
  - Density: 17.88/km^{2} (46.32/sq mi)
  - Urban: 40.7%
  - Rural: 59.3%

Administrative structure
  - Administrative divisions: 1 Urban administrative okrugs, 12 Rural administrative okrugs
  - Inhabited localities: 1 cities/towns, 125 rural localities

Municipal structure
  - Municipally incorporated as: Mglinsky Municipal District
  - Municipal divisions: 1 urban settlements, 12 rural settlements
- Time zone: UTC+3 (MSK)
- OKTMO ID: 15636000
- Website: http://www.mgladm.ru/

Mglinsky District (Russian: Мгли́нский райо́н) is an administrative and municipal district (raion), one of the twenty-seven in Bryansk Oblast, Russia. It is located in the west of the oblast. The area of the district is 1,088 square kilometers (420 sq mi). Its administrative center is the town of Mglin. Population: 15,960 (2021 census); 19,458 (2010 census); 22,551 (2002 Census); 24,564 (1989 Soviet census). The population of Mglin accounts for 43.4% of the district's total population.
